= Gesta Danorum på danskæ =

Gesta Danorum (English: "Deeds of the Danes"), called Gesta Danorum på danskæ ("Deeds of the Danes in Danish") to distinguish it from the better known Gesta Danorum by Saxo Grammaticus, is a Danish historical chronicle written in Old Danish in Lund around the year 1300.

Gesta Danorum på danskæ recounts the history of Danish kings from the legendary King Dan to the reign of Eric Menved.

The family tree of legendary Kings of the Danes, according to Gesta Danorum på danskæ (extract)

Kings of the Danes are marked with a crown (♕).

♕ Halfdan ♂	Ro ♂	Skat ♂	KEY
Marriage or coupling
♕ Ro or Halfdan ♂	♕ Helghe ♂	Thore ♀	Parent and child
Succession by other means
♕ A dog king ♂	Yrse ♀
♕ Snio ♂	♕ Rolf Krage ♂	Skulda ♀	♕ Hartwar ♂
Hodbrod ♂	Hadding's daughter ♀
♕ Hother ♂
♕ Rorik Slengeborre, also called Rake ♂	Rorik's sister ♀	Orwendel ♂	Feng ♂
King of Britain's daughter ♀	Amblothe ♂	Queen of Scotland ♀
♕ Wighlek ♂	Nanna ♀
♕ Wermund ♂
♕ Offe the Strong ♂

The source used for the genealogical information and name spellings is the English translation provided by Peter Tunstall.

== History ==
=== Source material ===
Gesta Danorum på danskæ covers much of the same legendary and historical material as Chronicon Lethrense and Saxo's Gesta Danorum, which were earlier works (released in the second half of the 12th century and the first years of the 13th century respectively) and written in Latin. It is not a direct translation or abbreviation of either work, and includes material from both along with alterations that appear in neither. For example, the tale of the dog king of Denmark who precedes the reign of Rolf Kraki, and how Snyo won the throne after the dog's death, appears in Gesta Danorum på danskæ (in which it was put on the throne by Hakon) and the Chronicon Lethrense (in which it was put on the throne by Athisl), but not in Saxo's Gesta Danorum. However, the story of the mortal king Hother slaying divine Balder is included in Gesta Danorum på danskæ and Saxo's Gesta Danorum, but not in Chronicon Lethrense.

It uses the line of kings from the Codex Runicus and the Stockholm law manuscripts (C 67 and B 72).

It is unrelated to the Annales Ryenses (Rydårbogen), except indirectly as both are based on the Chronicon Lethrense.

=== Manuscripts ===
Gesta Danorum på danskæ survives in two manuscripts, B 77 and C 67, both of which are medieval law codes referred to as a Codex Holmiensis (that is, a "Stockholm book", or manuscript from the National Library of Sweden). They are archived at the Royal Library (Det kongelige bibliotek) in Copenhagen. The manuscripts are:

- Cod. Holm. B 77 is a code of Scanian Law. It was written in the first half of the 15th century. This manuscript goes up to year 1295.
- Cod. Holm. C 67 is a code of Zealandic Law. This manuscript goes up to year 1305.

These manuscripts were edited and published by Marcus Lorenzen in the book Gammeldanske Krøniker (Old Danish Chronicle).

=== Translations ===
Gesta Danorum på danskæ was translated into Swedish shortly after being written. This early translation survives in the manuscript Cod. Holm. D 4, from around the year 1500. There are also a couple of post-medieval copies.

The philologist E. V. Gordon included an extract of the Old Norse text of the Gesta Danorum på danskæ (as published by Lorenzen) as an example text in his book An Introduction to Old Norse. The extract covered the portion of the work from the reign of Haldan to the reign of Offa the Strong, and was chosen because it contained material from Chronicon Lethrense that did not appear in Saxo's Gesta Danorum, and which therefore must have originated in a tradition that predated Saxo's work. This extract was subsequently translated into English by Peter Tunstall as an appendix to his translation of the Saga of Hrolf Kraki. This translation was erroneously given the title "The Chronicle of the Kings of Lejre (Chronicon Lethrense)", although that is an unrelated work.
