= Snær =

Personification of snow in Norse mythology

In Norse mythology, Snær (Old Norse Snærr, East Norse Sniō, Latin Nix, Nivis, English "snow") is seemingly a personification of snow, appearing in extant text as an euhemerized legendary Scandinavian king.

== Icelandic tradition ==
In the Orkneyinga saga, Snow the Old (Snærr hinn gamli) is son of Frosti 'frost', son of Kári. In the account called Hversu Noregr byggdist ('How Norway was inhabited') in the Flatey Book, Snær is son of Jökul (Jǫkull 'icicle, ice, glacier'), son of Kári. This Kári is lord of the wind and brother of Ægir or Hlér and Logi, all three being sons of the giant Fornjót. Fornjót was the king of "Gotlandi, Kænlandi and Finnlandi" and Snaer bears the title of a king too.

Snow's son in Orkneyinga saga and Hversu is Þorri 'frozen-snow'. The Hversu also gives Snow three daughters: Fön (Fǫnn 'Snowdrift'), Drifa (Drífa, 'snowfall'), and Mjöl (Mjǫll, 'powdered snow'). Sturlaugs saga (section 22) brings in King Snow of Finmark and his daughter Mjöl who flies quickly through the air.

The Ynglinga saga relates how Vanlandi the ruler of Sweden visited Snow and married his daughter Drífa, but left in the spring and did not return. Drífa bore Vanlandi a son called Vísbur. See Vanlandi for further details.

The Hversu also mentions in passing, when speaking of Snær's distant descendant Halfdan the Old, that Snær's life lasted three hundred years.

Snow's son Thorri reigned as king after Snow, and had two sons named Nór and Gór and a daughter named Gói ('thin snow, track-snow'). See Nór to follow this lineage further.

== Danish tradition ==
=== Snow and Lǣ ===
A legendary Danish king named Snow (Sniō) appears in the Annales Ryensis, section 14, and in the Chronicon Lethrense, section 5, between the reigns of Helgi and Hrólf Kraki.

The Chronicon Lethrense inserts the common folktale of the dog king after Helgi's death. In this account King Hākun of Sweden sent a small dog to the Danes to take as their king but warned that whoever told him of the death of the dog would lose his life. One day, when larger dogs are fighting, the small dog sprang to the floor among them and was torn to death. Then Lǣ, the giant of Lǣsø̄ (Læsø), gave some advice on the matter to his herdsman Snow. (Lǣ is a Danish form of Hlér, a common name for Ægir who is Snow's great-granduncle in the Norse tradition). Snow went to Hākun's court and by riddling talk eventually got the king himself to say that the dog was dead. Snow was then appointed king of Denmark in place of the dog. Snow was a vicious, oppressive, and dishonest king. Snow sent his servant named Roth 'Red', whom he disliked, to the giant Lǣ to ask about how Snow will die, intending that Lǣ would kill Roth who would be unable to pass his tests. Roth passed and Lǣ gave Roth two gloves to take to Snow in answer. Snow put them on in an assembly and lice suddenly attacked him and ate him to death. Thereupon Helgi's son Hrólf was made king.

The Annals of Lund tells the same tale, save that the king of Sweden is Adils which harmonizes with other tales in which Adils reigns over Sweden during the reigns of Helgi and his son Hrólf Kraki.

The family tree of legendary Kings of the Danes, according to Chronicon Lethrense

Kings of the Danes are marked with a crown (♕).

Ypper, King of Uppsala ♂
KEY
Nori ♂	Østen ♂	♕ Dan ♂	Dannia ♀	Marriage or coupling
Parent and child
Rolfcarl, aka Rolf, a baron ♂	♕ Ro ♂	Ro's wife ♀	Succession by other means
Thora ♀
♕ Helgi ♂	♕ Haldan ♂
Athisl, King of Swethia ♂	Ursula ♀	♕ Raka, a dog ♂
Siward Albus ♂	♕ Snyo ♂
♕ Hiarwart ♂	Sculd ♀	♕ Rolf Kraki ♂
Hamund ♂
♕ Aki ♂	Haghbard ♂	daughter of Rolf Kraki ♀	♕ Fritleff ♂
♕ Frothi Largus ♂
♕ Ingyald ♂
♕ Olav ♂
♕ Asa ♀
♕ Harald Hildetan (war-tooth) ♂
♕ Hethae ♀

The source used for the genealogical information and name spellings is the English translation provided by Mischa Hooker of Augustana College.

=== Snow son of Sivald ===
Saxo Grammaticus in his Gesta Danorum inserts the reign of Snow much later in Danish history, telling of him in book VIII among kings who reigned after the death of Harald War-tooth. Here Snow is a rightful king of Denmark, son of King Sivald.

Of King Sivald Saxo tells nothing save that Sivald was son of Broder, son of King Jarmerik (who is actually Ermanaric King of the Ostrogoths changed by Saxo or one of his sources into a king of Denmark).

Saxo makes Snow a brave Viking during his father's lifetime, who after gaining the crown crushed two champions named Eskil and Alkil and so regained Scania. Saxo then follows with a romantic tale of Snow's love for the daughter of an unnamed King of Götaland whom Snow eventually defeated in a single combat with the terms that the winner would rule both Denmark and Götaland. But finding that the dead king's daughter had been married to the king of Sweden, also unnamed here, Snow with the aid of an accomplice disguised as a beggar abducted her. Indecisive war with Sweden followed.

Then came a famine because of bad weather, this perhaps being an allegory having to do with Snow as a personification. Because of the lack of grain, Snow forbade making strong drink from grain and ordered abstinence from drinking alcohol on pain of death. Saxo follows with a tale of a lush who saved himself from death with clever excuses and finally convinced Snow to rescind those laws.

Then Saxo introduces Paul the Deacon's account of the origin of the Lombards which he summarizes. Paul the Deacon and made the Lombards to have been originally from an island of Scandza in the far north. According to Saxo this famine and the departure of many Danes explained why in his own day much of the Danish land was overrun with forests in which stone piles alone showed that the land had once been cultivated fields.

Snow was succeeded by his son Biorn.

The family tree of legendary Kings of the Danes, according to the Gesta Danorum (Books 1 to 8)

Kings of the Danes are marked with a crown (♕). Kings of the Swedes are marked with a dagger (†). Superscript numbers after a name indicate in which books of Gesta Danorum the individual is mentioned.

Humblus ♂ ^{(1)}
KEY
Angul ♂ ^{(1)}	♕ Dan I ♂ ^{(1)}	Grytha ♀ ^{(1)}	Marriage or coupling
Parent and child
The Angles	♕ Humblus ♂ ^{(1)}	♕ Lotherus ♂ ^{(1)}	King of the Saxons ♂ ^{(1)}	Succession by other or unclear means
Roarus ♂ ^{(1)}
Sigtrugus, King of the Swedes† ♂ ^{(1)}	♕ Skioldus ♂ ^{(1)}	Alvilda ♀ ^{(1)}
daughter of Roarus ♀ ^{(1)}	Bessus ♂ ^{(1)}
sister of Gram ♀ ^{(1)}	Gro ♀ ^{(1)}	♕ Gram† ♂ ^{(1)}	Sumblus, King of the Finns ♂ ^{(1)}
Wagnofthus ♂ ^{(1)}
Signe ♀ ^{(1)}	Henricus, King of the Saxons ♂ ^{(1)}	Haquinus, King of the Nitherians ♂ ^{(1)}
Harthgrepa ♀ ^{(1)}
♕Suibdagerus, King of Norway† ♂ ^{(1)}	sister of Guthormus ♀ ^{(1)}	♕Guthormus ♂ ^{(1)}	♕Hadingus ♂ ^{(1,2,4,5)}	Regnilda ♀ ^{(1)}
Asmundus† ♂ ^{(1)}	Gunnilda ♀ ^{(1)}	Guthormus ♂ ^{(1)}
Ulvilda ♀ ^{(1,2)}	♕ Ubbo ♂ ^{(2)}
Henricus ♂ ^{(1)}	Uffo† ♂ ^{(1)}	Hundingus† ♂ ^{(1,2)}	Thorilda ♀ ^{(2)}	Scottus ♂ ^{(2)}
daughter of Uffo ♀ ^{(1)}	Regnerus† ♂ ^{(2)}	Suanhuita ♀ ^{(2)}	sisters of Suanhuita ♀♀ ^{(2)}	Andwan, King of the Hellespont ♂ ^{(2)}
Thoraldus ♂ ^{(2)}
♕ Frotho I ♂ ^{(2,5)}	daughter of Andwan ♀ ^{(2)}
Hothbrodus† ♂ ^{(2,3)}	♕ Haldanus I ♂ ^{(2)}	Roe ♂ ^{(2)}	Skato ♂ ^{(2)}
Thora ♀ ^{(2)}
♕ Helgo ♂ ^{(2,3)}	♕ Roe ♂ ^{(2)}
Athislus† ♂ ^{(2,3)}	Ursa ♀ ^{(2)}
King Gevarus ♂ ^{(2,3)}	♕ Rolvo Krake† ♂ ^{(2,3)}	Ruta ♀ ^{(2)}	Biarco ♂ ^{(2)}	Sculda ♀ ^{(2)}	♕Hiarwarthus † ♂ ^{(2,3)}
♕ Hotherus† ♂ ^{(2,3)}	Nanna ♀ ^{(3)}	Herlecus ♂ ^{(3)}	Gericus ♂ ^{(3)}
former King of Britain ♂ ^{(3)}	mother of the King of Britain ♀ ^{(3)}	a slave ♂ ^{(3)}	a bondmaid ♀ ^{(3)}	♕ Roricus Slyngebond ♂ ^{(3)}	Gerwendillus ♂ ^{(3)}
King of Britain ♂ ^{(3,4)}	Queen of Britain ♀ ^{(3,4)}	Gerutha ♀ ^{(3,4)}	Horwendillus ♂ ^{(3,4)}	Fengo ♂ ^{(3,4)}
foster sister of Amlethus ♀ ^{(3,4)}	daughter of the King of Britain ♀ ^{(3,4)}	Amlethus ♂ ^{(3,4)}	Herminthruda, Queen of Scotland ♀ ^{(4)}	♕ Wiglecus ♂ ^{(4)}
son of Amlethus ♂ ^{(4)}	♕Wermundus ♂ ^{(4)}	Frowinus, governor of Sleswik ♂ ^{(4)}
♕ Uffo, aka Olavus the Gentle ♂ ^{(4)}	daughter of Frowin ♀ ^{(4)}	Keto ♂ ^{(4)}	Wigo ♂ ^{(4)}
♕ Dan II ♂ ^{(4)}
♕ Huglecus ♂ ^{(4)}
♕ Frotho II, the Vigorous ♂ ^{(4)}
♕ Dan III ♂ ^{(4)}
Craca ♀ ^{(5)}	Regnerus ♂ ^{(5)}	Bracus ♂ ^{(5)}	♕ Fridlevus I, the Swift ♂ ^{(4,5)}	Hun, King of the Huns ♂ ^{(5)}	Hun ♂ ^{(5)}
Gøtarus, King of Norway ♂ ^{(5)}	Westmarus ♂ ^{(5)}	Colo ♂ ^{(5)}	Gøtwara ♀ ^{(5)}
Rollerus ♂ ^{(5)}	Ericus the Shrewd-spoken† ♂ ^{(5,6)}	Gunwara the Fair ♀ ^{(5)}	Alvilda ♀ ^{(5)}	♕ Frotho III ♂ ^{(5,6)}	Hanunda ♀ ^{(5)}	Grep (eldest of three) ♂ ^{(5)}	11 other sons (two named Grep) ♂♂ ^{(5)}
Hythin, King of Tellemark ♂ ^{(6)}	Alvo ♂ ^{(5)}	Ofura ♀ ^{(5)}	Arngrimus ♂ ^{(5)}	Grubbus ♂ ^{(6)}	♕ Hiarnus ♂ ^{(6)}	Amundus, King of Norway ♂ ^{(6)}
child of Hythin ^{(6)}	Haldanus† ♂ ^{(6)}	12 sons, including Angantir ♂♂ ^{(5)}	Ano ♂ ^{(6)}	Iuritha ♀ ^{(6)}	♕ Fridlevus II ♂ ^{(6)}	Frogertha ♀ ^{(6)}
Hanevus, King of Saxony ♂ ^{(6)}	Suertingus, King of Saxony ♂ ^{(6)}	Olavus ♂ ^{(6)}	♕ Frotho IV ♂ ^{(6)}
Sywardus† ♂ ^{(6,7)}	sons of Suertingus ♂♂ ^{(6)}	sister of the sons of Suertingus ♀ ^{(6)}	♕ Ingellus ♂ ^{(6,7)}	Helga ♀ ^{(6)}	Helgo ♂ ^{(6)}	Asa ♀ ^{(6)}
three sons that died in war ♂♂ ^{(7)}	♕ Olavus I ♂ ^{(7)}	Karolus, governor of Gothland ♂ ^{(7)}
Ulvilda ♀ ^{(7)}	♕ Frotho V ♂ ^{(7)}	Hatherus ♂ ^{(7)}	♕ Haraldus I ♂ ^{(7)}	Sygne ♀ ^{(7)}
Ericus† ♂ ^{(7)}	Thorhilda ♀ ^{(7)}	♕ Haldanus II Biargrammus† ♂ ^{(7)}	♕Haraldus II ♂ ^{(7)}
Ebbo ♂ ^{(7)}	mother of Otharus ♀ ^{(7)}	♕ Unguinus, King of the Goths ♂ ^{(7)}	Asmundus ♂ ^{(7)}
sister of Otharus ♀ ^{(7)}	♕ Sywaldus I ♂ ^{(7)}	Sygrutha ♀ ^{(7)}	Kings of Norway
Sywardus, King of the Goths ♂ ^{(7)}	mother of Alvilda ♀ ^{(7)}	Otharus ♂ ^{(7)}	Syritha ♀ ^{(7)}	♕ Sygarus ♂ ^{(7)}	queen of Sygarus ♀ ^{(7)}	Hamundus, a petty king ♂ ^{(7)}
Wemundus ♂ ^{(7)}	Ostenus ♂ ^{(7)}	♕Sywaldus II ♂ ^{(7)}	Algerus ♂ ^{(7)}	Helwin ♂ ^{(7)}	Hamundus ♂ ^{(7)}
Regnaldus, King of the Northmen ♂ ^{(7)}	Alvilda ♀ ^{(7)}	Alf ♂ ^{(7)}	Sygne ♂ ^{(7)}	Hagbarthus ♂ ^{(7)}	Hako ♂ ^{(7)}
Gro ♀ ^{(7)}	Borcarus ♂ ^{(7)}	Drota ♀ ^{(7)}	Gunnarus ♂ ^{(7)}	Hano, ruler of Funen ♂ ^{(7)}	Ostmarus, ruler of Scania ♂ ^{(7)}	Hundingus, ruler of Zealand ♂ ^{(7)}	Roricus, co-ruler of Jutland ♂ ^{(7)}	Hatherus, co-ruler of Jutland ♂ ^{(7)}
Haraldus ♂ ^{(7)}	Hildigerus ♂ ^{(7)}	Røtho, a Ruthenian pirate ♂ ^{(7)}	Wesetus ♂ ^{(7)}
♕Haldanus III ♂ ^{(7)}	Guritha ♀ ^{(7)}
Alverus† ♂ ^{(7,8)}	♕ Haraldus III Hyldetan ♂ ^{(7)}
Olavus ♂ ^{(7)}	Ingo ♂ ^{(7)}	Ingeldus† ♂ ^{(7)}	sister of Haraldus ♀ ^{(7)}	Ubbo ♂ ^{(7)}	sister of Haraldus ♀ ^{(7)}	Sywardus ♂ ^{(7)}	sister of Haraldus ♀ ^{(7)}	Olavus, king of the Werms ♂ ^{(7)}
♕ Ringo† ♂ ^{(7,8)}	♕ Hetha ♀ ^{(8)}	♕ Olo the Vigorous ♂ ^{(7,8)}	Esa ♀ ^{(7)}	son of the king ♂ ^{(7,8)}
Atylo the Scanian ♂ ^{(8)}	Ringo, ruler of Norway ♂ ^{(8)}
Tola ♂ ^{(8)}	Omothus, or Homothus ♂ ^{(8)}	daughter of Ringo ♀ ^{(8)}	Esa ♀ ^{(8)}	♕ Omundus ♂ ^{(7,8)}
Sibbo ♂ ^{(8)}	sister of Gøtarus ♀ ^{(8)}	Gøtarus† ♂ ^{(8)}	daughter of Omundus ♀ ^{(8)}	♕ Sywardus I ♂ ^{(8)}	♕ Buthlus ♂ ^{(8)}	daughter of Omundus ♀ ^{(8)}
Ebbo ♂ ^{(8)}
early wife of Iarmericus ♀ ^{(8)}	♕Iarmericus † ♂ ^{(8)}	Suanilda ♀ ^{(8)}	the Hellepontines, 4 brothers ♂♂ ^{(8)}	Iarmericus' sister, sold to Norwegians ♀ ^{(8)}	Iarmericus' sister, sold to Germans ♀ ^{(8)}
♕ Broderus ♂ ^{(8)}	nephews of Iarmericus ♂♂ ^{(8)}
King of the Goths ♂ ^{(8)}	♕ Sywaldus III ♂ ^{(8)}
King of Sweden† ♂ ^{(8)}	daughter of the King of the Goths ♀ ^{(8)}	♕ Snio ♂ ^{(8)}
♕ Biorn ♂ ^{(8)}
♕ Haraldus III ♂ ^{(8)}
a wife from Sweden ♀ ^{(8)}	♕ Gormo I ♂ ^{(8)}
♕ Gotricus, or Godefridus ♂ ^{(8,9)}

Genealogical information is derived from Oliver Elton's 1905 translation, The First Nine Books of the Danish History of Saxo Grammaticus (via Wikisource). Name spellings are from the 1931 Latin critical edition by Olrik and Ræder (via Wikisource). Regnal numbers, which do not appear in the original text, are included for clarity and taken from the engraving Veræ effigies regum omnium by Erico Olai Tormio.

== Alternative spellings ==
Alternative Anglicizations are Ægir: Aegir ; Drífa: Drifa ; Fön: Fönn ; Hlér: Hler ; Jökul: Iökul ; Lǣ: Lee ; Mjöl: Mjol, Miöll ; Snær: Snaer, Snœr, Snow.

Legendary titles
Preceded by Sywaldus II	King of Denmark	Succeeded by Biorn
Preceded by Dog king	King of Denmark in Chronicon Lethrense	Succeeded by Rolf Krage
