= Vöggr =

Vöggr, Vogg, Wigg or Wigge was a young 6th century man in Scandinavian legend notable for giving Hrólfr Kraki (Hroðulf in Beowulf) his cognomen kraki, and for avenging his death.

== Skáldskaparmál ==
In the Skáldskaparmál by Snorri Sturluson, Snorri relates that Hrólfr was the most renowned king in Denmark for valour, generosity and graciousness. One day a poor boy called Vöggr arrived at the king's court at Lejre and expressed his surprise that such a great king would look like a little pole (kraki). Hrólfr said that Vöggr had given him a name and gave Vöggr a golden ring in recompense. In gratitude Vöggr swore to Hrólfr to avenge him, should he be killed.

== Hrólfr Kraki's saga ==
Hrólfr Kraki's saga tells that when Hrólfr Kraki went to the Swedish king Aðils (Eadgils), queen Yrsa (Hrólfr's mother) presented them a man named Vöggr to entertain them. This Vöggr remarked that Hrólfr had the thin face of a pole ladder, a Kraki. Happy with his new cognomen Hrólfr gave Vöggr a golden ring, and Vöggr swore to avenge Hrólfr if anyone should kill him.

Hrólfr fled from Uppsala and lived in peace for some time. However, his half-elven half-sister Skuld was married to Hjörvarðr (Heoroweard) one of Hrólfr's subkings, and she began to turn her husband against Hrólfr. Under the pretext that they would wait three years before paying the accumulated tribute at one time, Skuld assembled a large army which included strong warriors, criminals, elves and norns. She used seiðr (witchcraft) to hide the great muster from Hrólfr and his champions.

They then arrived at Lejre one Yule for the midwinter blóts, with all the weapons hidden in wagons. A fight started and like in the account found in Gesta Danorum, Bödvar Bjarki fought in the shape of a spirit bear until he was awakened by Hjalti. Skuld used her witchcraft to resuscitate her fallen warriors and after a long fight Hrólfr and all his berserkers fell.

Skuld became the ruler of Denmark but did not rule well. Bödvar Bjarki's brothers Elk-Froði and Þorir Houndsfoot went to Denmark to avenge their brother. The Swedish queen Yrsa gave them a large Swedish army headed by Vöggr. They captured Skuld before she could use her magic and tortured her to death. Then they raised a mound for Hrólfr Kraki where he was buried together with his sword Skofnung.

== Chronicon Lethrense and Annales Lundenses ==
The Chronicon Lethrense (and the included Annales Lundenses) tell that Rolf Krage was a big man in body and soul and was so generous that no one asked him for anything twice. His sister Skulda was married against Rolf's will to Hartwar/Hiarwarth (Heoroweard), a German earl of Skåne, but reputedly Rolf had given Skulda to him together with Sweden.

This Hartwar arrived in Zealand with a large army and said that he wanted to give his tribute to Rolf, but killed Rolf together with all his men. Only one survived, Wigge, who played along until he was to do homage to Hartwar. Then, he pierced Hartwar with a sword, and so Hartwar was only king one morning. However, according to a reputation, it was instead an Ake who killed Hartwar and so became king.

== Gesta Danorum ==
The Gesta Danorum (book 2), by Saxo Grammaticus, tells that a young man named Wigg was impressed with Roluo's (Hrólfr's) bodily size and gave him the cognomen Krage, which meant a tall tree trunk used as a ladder. Roluo liked this name and rewarded Wigg with a heavy bracelet. Wigg, then, swore to Roluo to avenge him, if he was killed.

Roluo later defeated the king of Sweden, Athislus (Eadgils), and gave Sweden to young man named Hiartuar (Heoroweard), who also married Roluo's sister Skulde. Skulde, however, did not like the fact that her husband had to pay taxes to Roluo and so incited Hiartuar to rebel against him. They so went to Lejre (a town which Roluo had built) with arms hidden in the ships, under the pretense that they wanted to pay tribute.

They were well-received, but after the banquet, when most people were drunk asleep, the Swedes and the Goths (i.e. the Geats) proceeded to kill everyone at Roluo's residence. After a long battle, involving Roluo's champion Bjarki, who fought in the shape of a spirit bear until he was awakened by his comrade Hjalti, the Geats won and Roluo was killed.

Hiartuar asked Wigg if he wanted to fight for him, and Wigg said yes. Hiartuar wanted to give Wigg a sword, but he insisted on receiving it by taking the hilt. Having the hilt in his hand, Wigg pierced Hiartuar with the sword and so avenged Roluo. Swedes and Geats then rushed forward and killed Wigg. The Swedish king Høtherus (based on the god Höðr), the brother of Athislus, succeeded Roluo and became the king of a combined Sweden and Denmark.

== Other personages by the same name ==
Another character by the same name appears in Ásmundar saga kappabana.

== Bibliography ==
- English translations of the Old Norse Hrólfs saga kraka ok kappa hans:
  - The Saga of Hrolf Kraki and his Champions. Trans. Peter Tunstall (2003). Available at The Saga of Hrolf Kraki.
  - The Saga of King Hrolf Kraki. Trans. Jesse L. Byock (1998). London: Penguin. ISBN 0-14-043593-X. Selections from this translation are available at The Viking Site: Excerpts from The Saga of King Hrolf Kraki.
  - "King Hrolf and his champions" included in Eirik the Red: And Other Icelandic Sagas. Trans. Gwyn Jones (1961). Oxford: Oxford World's Classics, Oxford University Press. ISBN 0-19-283530-0.
- Original texts:
  - Hrólfs saga kraka ok kappa hans in Old Norse from heimskringla.no
  - University of Oregon: Norse: Fornaldarsögur norðurlanda: Hrólfs saga kraka ok kappa hans
  - Sagnanet: Hrólfs saga kraka
- Anderson, Poul (1973). Hrolf Kraki's Saga. New York: Ballantine Books. ISBN 0-345-23562-2. New York: Del Rey Books. ISBN 0-345-25846-0. Reprinted 1988 by Baen Books, ISBN 0-671-65426-8.
- Birger Nerman, 1925, Det svenska rikets uppkomst (in Swedish)
- Chronicon Lethrense and Annales Lundense:
  - Chronicon Lethrense and Annales Lundense in translation by Peter Tunstall
- Book 2 of Gesta Danorum at the Online and Medieval & Classical library
- The Relation of the Hrolfs Saga Kraka and the Bjarkarimur to Beowulf by Olson, 1916, at Project Gutenberg
- the Ynglinga saga in translation by Samuel Laing, 1844
- The Gróttasöngr in Thorpe's translation
- Skáldskaparmál:
  - Snorri Sturluson's Prose Edda in the original language
  - CyberSamurai Encyclopedia of Norse Mythology: Prose Edda - Skáldskaparmál (English)
  - CyberSamurai Encyclopedia of Norse Mythology: Prose Edda - Skáldskaparmál (Old Norse)
