= Snœr =

Snœr may refer to:

== Norse mythology ==
- Snær, seemingly a personification of snow
- Snör, bride of Karl in the Eddic poem Rígsþula
