= Halga =

Legendary Danish king

Halga seducing his own daughter Yrsa, by Jenny Nyström (1895).

Halga, Helgi, Helghe or Helgo was a legendary Danish king living in the early 6th century. His name would in his own language (Proto-Norse) have been *Hailaga (dedicated to the gods).

Scholars generally agree that he appears in both Anglo-Saxon (Beowulf) and Scandinavian tradition (Norse sagas and Danish chronicles). In both traditions, he was a Scylding, the son of Healfdene and the brother of Hroðgar. In Beowulf, his relationship to Hroðulf is not explained, but if he was not his father, as in the Scandinavian tradition, he was at least his uncle. Both traditions also mention his family's feud with Froda and Ingeld.

Whereas, not much is said about Halga in Anglo-Saxon sources, much more is said in Scandinavian ones. It is also noticed a curb in Halga storyline's direction, all of them containing a version of the story of his incestuous relationship with his own daughter Yrsa. This liaison resulted in Halga's son Hroðulf.

== Beowulf ==
Hrólf Kraki Tradition

Hrólf Kraki's saga
Ynglinga saga
Lejre Chronicle
Gesta Danorum
Beowulf
People
Hrólfr Kraki
Halfdan
Helgi
Yrsa
Adils
Áli
Bödvar Bjarki
Hjörvard
Roar
Locations
Lejre
Uppsala
Fyrisvellir

A mention of Halga in the Beowulf

In the Anglo-Saxon epic Beowulf, Halga is hardly mentioned. He appears early in the poem where he is listed as the brave Halga, one of the four children of Healfdene, the others being Heorogar, Hroðgar and a daughter (who is unnamed, but called Signý in Norse sources) who was married to the king of Sweden.

59 Ðæm feower bearn forðgerimed

60 in worold wocun weoroda ræswa
61 heorogar. 7 hroðgar 7 halga til
62 hyrde ic ~~þ~~ elan cwen

63 heaðo-Scilfingas healsgebedda

This appears in Gummere's translation as:

59 Then, one after one, there woke to him,

60 to the chieftain of clansmen, children four:
61 Heorogar, then Hrothgar, then Halga brave;
62 and I heard that — ela's queen,

63 the Heathoscylfing’s helpmate dear.

Hroðulf (Hrólfr Kraki) is only mentioned as Hroðgar's nephew, whereas he is specified as Halga's son in Norse sources.

Family tree of the Scyldings (Kings of the Danes), Heathobards and Scylfings (Kings of the Swedes), according to Beowulf

♕ Heremod
♕ Scyld Scefing
♕ Beowulf
♕ Healfdene	♕ Ongentheow
♕ Heorogar	♕ Hrothgar	Wealhtheow	Halga	A daughter	♕ Onela	♕ Ohthere
Heoroweard	Hrethric	Hrothmund	Hrothulf	Froda	Eanmund	Eadgils
Freawaru	Ingeld

== Chronicon Lethrense and Annales Lundenses ==
The Chronicon Lethrense (and the included Annales Lundenses) tells that Haldan (Healfdene) had two sons, Helghe and Ro (Hroðgar). When Haldan died of old age, Helghe and Ro divided the kingdom so that Ro ruled the land, and Helghe the sea. One day, Helghe arrived in Halland/Lolland and slept with Thore, the daughter of one of Ro's farmers. This resulted in a daughter named Yrse. Much later, he met Yrse, and without knowing that she was his daughter, he made her pregnant with Hrólfr Kraki (Hroðulf). Helghe later warred in Wendland and killed the king of the Wends. He also won all of Denmark by killing a Hodbrod. Lastly, he found out that Yrse, with whom he had slept, was his own daughter, went east and killed himself.

Both Helghe and Ro being dead, the Swedish king Hakon/Athisl (i.e. Eadgils) forced the Danes to accept a dog as king. The dog king was succeeded by Hrolf Kraki.

== Gesta Danorum ==
If the Chronicon Lethrense reports that the Swedes humiliated the Danes after Helghe's death, Saxo Grammaticus mentions nothing of this, but instead he has Helgo humiliate the Swedes in his Gesta Danorum, book 2. He also confused, or merged, Helgo with Helgi Hundingsbane, who in other sources is either a Völsung or a Geatish Wulfing (Ylfing). It is possible that it was the information that both killed a Hothbrodd and were called Helgi that inspired the merger.

Saxo agrees with Beowulf and the Chronicon Lethrense by describing Helgo and Ro (Hroðgar) as the sons of Haldanus (Healfdene). Like the Chronicon Lethrense, he relates that Ro and Helgo shared the kingdom after Haldanus' death (of old age), Ro taking the land, and Helgo the sea. Saxo adds that Helgo was a rather tall man.

Helgo attacked and killed king Skalk of Sklavia (i.e. the king of Wendland), subduing Sklavia into a Danish province. Continuing his sea roving, Helgo arrived at Thurø, where he found and raped the young girl Thora, which resulted in Urse.

He earned the name Hundingsbane by slaying Hunding, the king of Saxony, and conquered Jutland from the Saxons and entrusted it to his commanders Heske, Eyr and Ler. He then humiliated the Saxon aristocracy by enacting a law that the killing of one of them would be no more costly in wergild than the killing of a commoner.

When Helgo after many years returned to Thurø, Thora avenged her lost virginity by sending Urse to Helgo, who unknowingly raped his own daughter. This resulted in Roluo Kraki (i.e. Hroðulf).

Whereas the Chronicon Lethrense and the Annales Lundenses do not explain why Halga needed to kill Hodbrod to win all of Denmark, the Gesta Danorum presents Hothbrodd as a king of Sweden, who invaded Denmark and killed Ro. After having killed Hothbrodd, avenging the death of his brother, he humiliated the Swedes by forbidding that any crime against a Swede should result in any punishment by law. Then, hating his own country, he went east and died, reputedly by throwing himself onto his own sword. He was succeeded by his son Roluo.

The family tree of legendary Kings of the Danes, according to the Gesta Danorum (Books I to VII)

Kings of the Danes are in bold and marked with a crown (♕). Kings of the Swedes are marked with a dagger (†). Superscript numbers before a name indicate in which books of Gesta Danorum the individual is mentioned.

^{(1)} Humble
KEY
^{(1)} Angul	^{(1)} **Dan** ♕	^{(1)} Grytha	Marriage or coupling
Parent and child
The Angles	^{(1)} **Humble** ♕	^{(1)} **Lother** ♕	^{(1)} King of the Saxons	Succession by other or unclear means
^{(1)} Roar
^{(1)} Sigtryg, King of the Swedes†	^{(1)} **Skiold** ♕	^{(1)} Alfhild
^{(1)} daughter of Roar	^{(1)} Bess
^{(1)} sister of Gram	^{(1)} Gróa	^{(1)} **Gram** ♕†	^{(1)} Sumble, King of the Finns
^{(1)} Wagnhofde
^{(1)} Signe	^{(1)} Henry, King of the Saxons	^{(1)} Hakon, King of the Nitherians
^{(1)} Hardgrep
^{(1)} **Swipdag** ♕†, King of Norway	^{(1)} sister of Guthorm	^{(1)} **Guthorm** ♕	^{(1,2,5)} **Hadding** ♕	^{(1)} Ragnhild
^{(1)} Asmund†	^{(1)} Gunnhild	^{(1)} Guthorm
^{(1,2)} Ulfhild	^{(2)} **Ubbe** ♕
^{(1)} Henry	^{(1)} Uffe†	^{(1,2)} Hunding†	^{(2)} Thorhild	^{(2)} Scot
^{(1)} daughter of Uffe	^{(2)} Ragnar†	^{(2)} Swanhwid	^{(2)} sisters of Swanhwid	^{(2)} Handwan
^{(2)} Thorwald
^{(2,5)} **Frode** ♕	^{(2)} daughter of Handwan
^{(2,3)} Hothbrodd†	^{(2)} **Halfdan** ♕	^{(2)} Ro	^{(2)} Skat
^{(2)} Thora
^{(2,3)} **Helge** ♕	^{(2)} **Ro** ♕
^{(2,3)} Athisl†	^{(2)} Urse
^{(2,3)} King Gewar	^{(2,3)} **Rolf** Krage ♕†	^{(2)} Rute	^{(2)} Bjarke	^{(2)} Skulde	^{(2,3)} **Hiartuar** †♕
^{(2,3)} **Hother** †♕	^{(3)} Nanna	^{(3)} Herlek	^{(3)} Gerit
^{(3)} former King of Britain	^{(3)} mother of the King of Britain	^{(3)} a slave	^{(3)} a bondmaid	^{(3)} **Rorik** Slyngebond ♕	^{(3)} Gerwendil
^{(3,4)} King of Britain	^{(3,4)} Queen of Britain	^{(3,4)} Gerutha	^{(3,4)} Horwendil	^{(3,4)} Feng
^{(3,4)} foster sister of Amleth	^{(3,4)} daughter of the King of Britain	^{(3,4)} Amleth	^{(4)} Hermutrude, Queen of Scotland	^{(4)} **Wiglek** ♕
^{(4)} son of Amleth	^{(4)} **Wermund** ♕	^{(4)} Frowin, governor of Sleswik
^{(4)} **Uffe** ♕, aka Olaf the Gentle	^{(4)} daughter of Frowin	^{(4)} Ket	^{(4)} Wig
^{(4)} **Dan** ♕
^{(4)} **Hugleik** ♕
^{(4)} **Frode** the Vigorous ♕
^{(4)} **Dan** ♕
^{(5)} Kraka	^{(5)} Ragnar	^{(5)} Brak	^{(4,5)} **Fridleif** the Swift ♕	^{(5)} Hun, King of the Huns	^{(5)} Hun
^{(5)} Gotar, King of Norway	^{(5)} Westmar	^{(5)} Koll	^{(5)} Gotwar
^{(5)} Roller	^{(5,6)} Erik† Shrewd-spoken	^{(5)} Gunwar the Fair	^{(5)} Alfhild	^{(5,6)} **Frode** ♕	^{(5)} Hanund	^{(5)} Grep (eldest of three)	^{(5)} 11 other sons (two named Grep)
^{(6)} Hythin, King of Tellemark	^{(5)} Alf	^{(5)} Eyfura	^{(5)} Arngrim	^{(6)} Grubb	^{(6)} **Hiarn** ♕	^{(6)} Amund, King of Norway
^{(6)} child of Hythin	^{(6)} Halfdan†	^{(5)} 12 sons, including Anganty	^{(6)} Ane	^{(6)} Juritha	^{(6)} **Fridleif** ♕	^{(6)} Frogertha
^{(6)} Hanef, King of Saxony	^{(6)} Swerting, King of Saxony	^{(6)} Olaf	^{(6)} **Frode** ♕
^{(6,7)} Siward†	^{(6)} sons of Swerting	^{(6)} sister of the sons of Swerting	^{(6,7)} **Ingild** ♕	^{(6)} Helga	^{(6)} Helge	^{(6)} Asa
^{(6,7)} Frode	^{(6,7)} Fridleif	^{(6,7)} Ingild	^{(6,7)} **Olaf** ♕	^{(7)} Karl, governor of Gothland
^{(7)} Ulfhild	^{(7)} **Frode** ♕	^{(7)} Hather, a chief	^{(7)} **Harald** ♕	^{(7)} Signe
^{(7)} Erik†	^{(7)} Thorhild	^{(7)} **Halfdan** Biargramm ♕†	^{(7)} Harald
^{(7)} Asmund
Kings of Norway

Name spellings are derived from Oliver Elton's 1905 translation, The First Nine Books of the Danish History of Saxo Grammaticus, via Wikisource.

== Hrólfr Kraki's saga ==
In Hrólfr Kraki's saga, Halfdan (Healfdene) had three children, the sons Helgi and Hróarr (Hroðgar) and the daughter Signý. The sister was the eldest and married to Sævil Jarl, with whom she had the son Hrókr. Halfdan was murdered by his own brother Fróði (Froda) and the two brothers had to seek refuge with a man called Vivil on an island, until they could avenge their father and kill Fróði.

Hróarr moved to Northumbria and married king Norðri's daughter Ögn, whereas Helgi became the new king of Denmark, but stayed unmarried. Wanting a spouse, Helgi went to the Saxons to woo their warlike queen Oluf. She was, however, not interested and humiliated Helgi by shaving his head and covering him with tar while he was asleep, and sending him back to his ship. Some time later, Helgi returned and through a ruse, he kidnapped the queen for a while during which time he got her pregnant.

Having returned to her kingdom, the queen bore a child, a girl whom she named Yrsa after her dog. Yrsa was set to live as a shepherd until she was 12 years old, when she met her father Helgi, who fell in love with her, not knowing it was his daughter. Oluf kept quiet about the parentage and saw it as her revenge that Helgi would wed his own daughter. Helgi and Yrsa had a son, Hrólfr Kraki (Hroðulf). For his share of the kingdom, Hróarr had been given a precious ring, an heirloom. There was, however, a second relative who wanted his share, their nephew Hrókr. Since Hrókr was given neither a part of the kingdom nor the ring, he went to Northumbria, killed Hróarr and threw the ring into the water (later retrieved by Hróarr's son Agnar). Helgi avenged his brother by cutting off Hrókr's arms and legs.

Learning that Helgi and Yrsa were living happily together, Queen Oluf travelled to Denmark to tell her daughter the truth. Yrsa was shocked and although Helgi wanted their relationship to remain as it was, Yrsa insisted on leaving him. She was later taken by the Swedish king Aðils (Eadgils) as his queen, which made Helgi even more unhappy.

Later, one Yule, Helgi was visited by an ugly being while he was in his hunting house. No person in the entire kingdom would allow the being to enter their house, except Helgi. Later, the thing asked to sleep in his bed. Unwillingly he agreed, and as the thing got into bed, it turned into an elvish woman, who was clad in silk and who was the most beautiful woman he had ever seen. He raped her, and made her pregnant with a daughter named Skuld. Helgi forgot the woman and a couple of days after the date had passed, he was visited by the woman, who had Skuld in her arms. The daughter would later marry Hjörvarðr (Heoroweard), Hrólfr Kraki's killer.

Missing Yrsa, Helgi went to Uppsala to fetch her, but was killed by Aðils in battle. He was succeeded by his son Hrólfr.

The family tree of legendary Kings of the Danes, according to Hrólfs saga kraka

Kings of the Danes are marked with a crown (♕).

Sigríðr ♀	♕ Hálfdan ♂	♕ Fróði ♂	KEY
Marriage or coupling
Sævil jarl ♂	Signý ♀	Norðri, a King in England ♂	Ólöf, Queen of Saxland ♀	Parent and child
Hrókr ♂	Ögn ♀	♕ Hróarr ♂	♕ Helgi ♂	Yrsa ♀	Aðils, King of Sweden ♂	King of the Finns ♂	Ingibjörg ♀
Agnarr ♂	An elf-woman ♀	King Hring ♂	Hvít ♀
Hjörvarðr, a king ♂	♕ Skuld ♀	♕ Hrólfr Kraki ♂	Björn ♂	Bera, a farmer's daughter ♀
♕ Skúr ♀	♕ Drífa ♀	Böðvarr ♂	Elg-Fróði ♂	Þórir Houndsfoot ♂

The source used for the genealogical information is the English translation by Peter Tunstall, and spellings are from the Old Norse edition edited by Guðni Jónsson.

== Skjöldunga saga and Bjarkarímur ==
The Skjöldunga saga and Bjarkarímur relate that Halfdan (Healfdene) and his queen Sigrith had three children: the sons Roas (Hroðgar) and Helgo and the daughter Signy.

Ingjaldus (i.e. Ingeld, but here he is presented as Halfdan's half-brother) attacked Halfdan, killed him and married Sigrith. Ingjaldus and Sigrith had the sons Rærecus and Frodo (Froda), while Signy grew up with her mother until she was married to Sævil, the jarl of Zealand. Roas and Helgo survived by hiding on an island near Skåne, and when they were old enough, they avenged their father by killing Ingjaldus.

The two brothers both became kings of Denmark, and Roas married the daughter of the king of England. Helgo, on the other hand, raped Olava, the queen of the Saxons, and she bore a daughter named Yrsa. The girl later married king Adillus (Eadgils), the king of Sweden. Some years later, Helgo attacked Sweden and captured Yrsa, whom he raped. His daughter bore him the son Rolfo (Hroðulf). After a few years, Yrsa's mother, Queen Olava, came to visit her and told her that Helgo was her own father. Yrsa returned to Adillus, leaving her son behind. Helgo died when Rolfo was eight years old, and Rolfo succeeded him. Not much later, Roas was killed by his half-brothers Rærecus and Frodo, whereupon Rolfo became the sole king of Denmark.

== Ynglinga saga ==
In Snorri Sturluson's Ynglinga saga, a part of the Heimskringla, he mentions the tradition of Halga, Eadgils and Yrsa, and he based his account on the Skjöldunga saga (he had access to the now lost original version).

He wrote that king Halfdan's (Healfdene) son Helgi ruled in Lejre. He invaded Sweden with such a large army that king Aðils (Eadgils) could not do anything else but to flee Uppsala. Helgi amassed a great deal of booty and took queen Yrsa (whom Aðils had found in Saxony) with him. Yrsa bore a son named Hrólfr Kraki (Hroðulf). When the boy was three years of age, Yrsa's mother, queen Alof of Saxony, came to visit her and told her that her husband Helgi was her own father. Then Yrsa returned to Sweden and king Aðils. Hrólfr Kraki was only eight years old when Helgi died during a war expedition, and Hrólfr was proclaimed his successor.

== Sources ==
- Beowulf:
- Beowulf read aloud in Old English
  - Modern English translation by Francis Barton Gummere
  - Modern English translation by John Lesslie Hall
  - Ringler, Dick. Beowulf: A New Translation For Oral Delivery, May 2005. Searchable text with full audio available, from the University of Wisconsin-Madison Libraries.
  - Several different Modern English translations
- Chronicon Lethrense and Annales Lundense:
  - Chronicon Lethrense and Annales Lundenses in translation by Peter Tunstall
  - The same translation at Northvegr
- Book 2 of Gesta Danorum at the Online Medieval & Classical library
- The Relation of the Hrolfs Saga Kraka and the Bjarkarimur to Beowulf by Olson, 1916, at Project Gutenberg
- Hrólf Kraki's saga in English translation at Northvegr
- the Ynglinga saga in translation by Samuel Laing, 1844, at Northvegr

Legendary titles
Preceded by Haldanus I	King of Denmark in Gesta Danorum with Ro	Succeeded by Rolvo Krake
Preceded by Haldanus I	King of Denmark in Chronicon Lethrense with Ro	Succeeded by The dog king
