= Hrólfr Kraki =

Semi-legendary Danish king

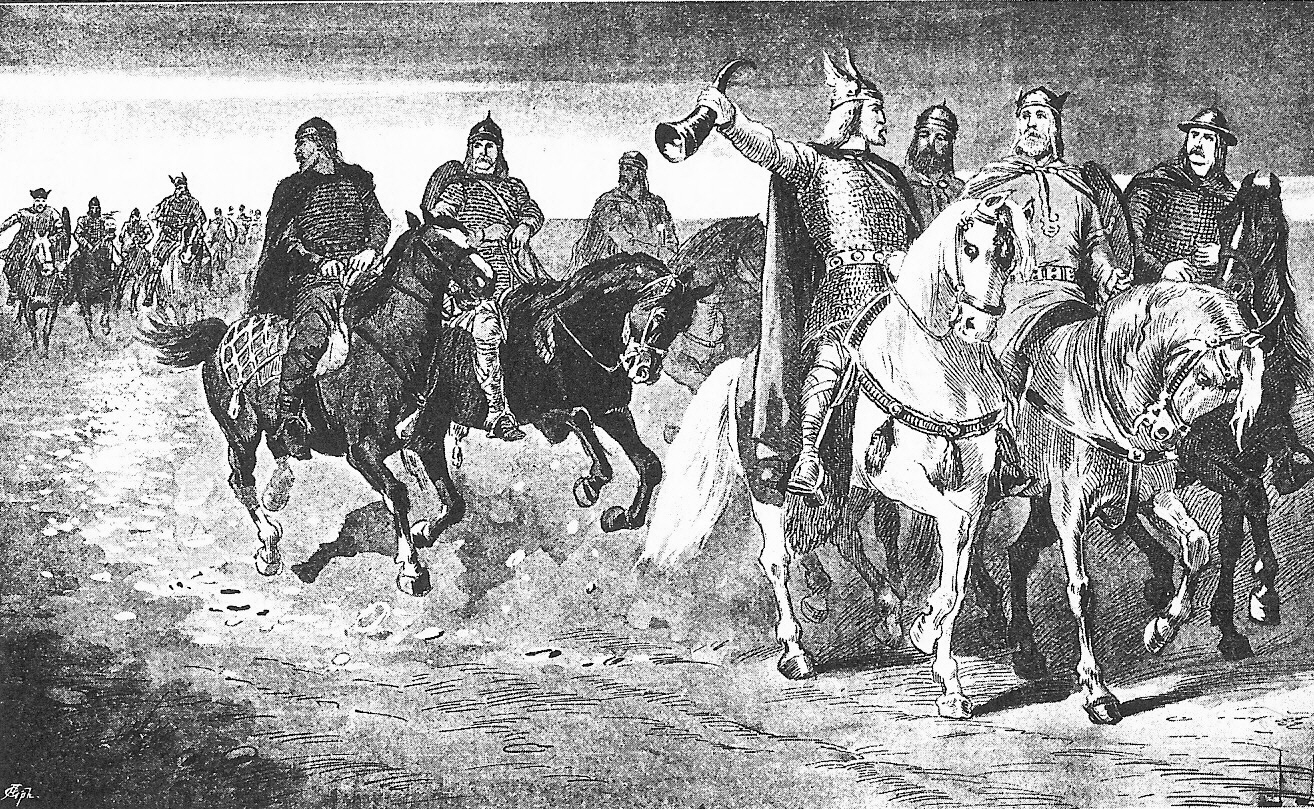
- Hrólfr Kraki spreading gold to escape the Swedes, by Jenny Nyström (1895).
- Died: 6th-century
- Known for: Semi-legendary Danish king

Hrólfr Kraki (Old Norse: [ˈhroːlvz̠ ˈkrɑke]), Hroðulf, Rolfo, Roluo, Rolf Krage (early 6th century) was a semi-legendary Danish king who appears in both Anglo-Saxon and Scandinavian tradition.

Both traditions describe him as a Danish Scylding, the nephew of Hroðgar and the grandson of Healfdene. The consensus view is that Anglo-Saxon and Scandinavian traditions describe the same people. Whereas the Anglo-Saxon Beowulf and Widsith do not go further than treating his relationship with Hroðgar and their animosity with Froda and Ingeld, the Scandinavian sources expand on his life as the king at Lejre and on his relationship with Halga, Hroðgar's brother. In Beowulf and Widsith, it is never explained how Hroðgar and Hroðulf are uncle and nephew.

== Beowulf ==
Hrólf Kraki Tradition

Hrólf Kraki's saga
Ynglinga saga
Lejre Chronicle
Gesta Danorum
Beowulf
People
Hrólfr Kraki
Halfdan
Helgi
Yrsa
Adils
Áli
Bödvar Bjarki
Hjörvard
Roar
Locations
Lejre
Uppsala
Fyrisvellir

The poem Beowulf introduces Hroðulf as kinsman. Later, the text explains that Hroðulf is Hroðgar's nephew and that "each was true to the other". Hroðgar is given three siblings, brothers Heorogar and Halga and an unnamed sister, all the children of Healfdene and belonging to the royal clan known as the Scyldings. The poem does not indicate which of Hroðgar's siblings is Hroðulf's parent, but later Scandinavian tradition establishes this as Halga.

Hroðgar and queen Wealhþeow had two young sons, Hreðric and Hroðmund, and Hroðulf would be their guardian in case Hroðgar dies. In a deliberately ironic passage it appears that the queen trusts Hroðulf, not suspecting that he will murder her sons to claim the throne for himself:

--Ic minne can glædne Hroðulf, þæt he þa geogoðe wile arum healdan, gyf þu ær þonne he, wine Scildinga, worold oflætest; wene ic, þæt he mid gode gyldan wille uncran eaferan, gif he þæt eal gemon, hwæt wit to willan and to worð-myndum umbor wesendum ær arna gefremedon.	--For gracious I deem my Hrothulf, willing to hold and rule nobly our youths, if thou yield up first, prince of Scyldings, thy part in the world. I ween with good he will well requite offspring of ours, when all he minds that for him we did in his helpless days of gift and grace to gain him honor!

No existence of any Hreðric or Hroðmund, sons of Hroðgar, has survived in Scandinavian sources (although Hreðric has been suggested to be the same person as Hroerekr/Roricus, a Danish king generally described as a son or successor of Ingjald). This Hroerekr is sometimes said to have been killed by Hrólfr, vindicating the foreshadowing in Beowulf.

The Scyldings were in conflict with another clan or tribe named the Heaðobards led by their king Froda and his son Ingeld. It is in relation to this war that Hroðulf is mentioned in the other Anglo-Saxon poem where he appears, Widsith.

=== Hrólf and Hroðulf ===
A common identification is that Hrólf Kraki is the same as the character Hroðulf (Hroðgar's nephew) in Beowulf. There seems to be some foreshadowing in Beowulf that Hroðulf will attempt to usurp the throne from Hroðgar's sons Hreðric and Hroðmund, a deed that also seems to be referred to in Saxo Grammaticus's Gesta Danorum (Book 2), where we find: "... our king, who laid low Rorik, the son of Bok the covetous, and wrapped the coward in death." Rorik is the form we would expect Hreðric to take in Danish and we find personages named Rorik or Hrok or similar in most version of the Hrólf Kraki tradition, but differently accounted for, seemingly indicating that Scandinavian tradition had forgotten who exactly Hreðric/Rorik/Hrok was and various story tellers subsequently invented details to explain references to this personage in older poems. The future slaying of Hreðric may be the occasion of the future burning of the hall of Heorot in the beginning of the poem – though some take it instead to refer to the legendary death of Hrólf Kraki, who in Icelandic sources is said to have died in the burning of his hall by his brother-in-law Hjörvard.

=== Beowulf and Bjarki ===
The standard view is that, if Beowulf himself has a 'cognate' character in Rolf Kraki's story, it is Bödvar Bjarki (Bodvar Biarke), who also has a younger companion, Hjalti (Hialte) – perhaps matching the Beowulf character Wiglaf. Beowulf comes from Geatland (= Götaland) and one of Bödvar Bjarki's elder brothers, Thorir, becomes a king of Götaland. Moreover, like Beowulf, Bödvar Bjarki arrives in Denmark from Götaland (Geatland), and upon arriving in Denmark he kills a beast that has been ravaging the Danish court for two years. The monster in Hrólf Kraki's saga, however, is quite unlike the Grendel of Beowulf; but it does have characteristics of a more typical dragon, a creature which appears later in Beowulf. Just as Beowulf and Wiglaf slay a dragon at the end of Beowulf, Bödvar Bjarki and Hjalti help each other slay the creature in Denmark.

Proponents of this theory, like J. R. R. Tolkien, argue that both the names Beowulf (lit. "bee-wolf", a kenning for "bear") and Bjarki are associated with bears. Bodvar Bjarki is constantly associated with bears, his father actually being one.

In some of the Hrólf Kraki material, Bödvar Bjarki aids Adils in defeating Adils' uncle Áli, in the Battle on the Ice of Lake Vänern. In Beowulf, the hero Beowulf aids Eadgils in Eadgils' war against Onela. As far as this Swedish adventure is concerned, Beowulf and Bödvar Bjarki are one and the same. This match supports the hypothesis that the adventure with the dragon is also originally derived from the same story.

=== Hrothgar and Hróar ===
As for the king of the Danes, Hroðgar, he is identical to Hróar or Ro, the uncle of Hrólf Kraki who in other sources outside of Beowulf rules as a co-king with his brother Helgi. But in those sources it is Hróar/Hroðgar who dies before his brother or who departs to Northumberland to rule his wife's kingdom leaving Helgi/Halga the sole rule of Denmark. In Beowulf Halga/Helgi has died and Hroðgar is the primary ruler with Hroðulf son of Halga as a junior co-ruler.

Furthermore, the Swedish kings referenced in Beowulf are adequately matched with the 5th and 6th century Swedish kings in Uppsala (see also Swedish semi-legendary kings): This has obviously nothing to do with a common origin of the Beowulf and Hrólf Kraki legends in particular but simply reflects a shared genealogical tradition.

Beowulf	Hrólf Kraki, Heimskringla etc.	Relation
Ongenþeow	Egil (Angantyr)	father of Ottar and Ale
Ohthere	Ottar	brother of Áli
Onela	Áli	brother of Ottar
Eadgils	Adils	son of Ottar

Family tree of the Scyldings (Kings of the Danes), Heathobards and Scylfings (Kings of the Swedes), according to Beowulf

♕ Heremod
♕ Scyld Scefing
♕ Beowulf
♕ Healfdene	♕ Ongentheow
♕ Heorogar	♕ Hrothgar	Wealhtheow	Halga	A daughter	♕ Onela	♕ Ohthere
Heoroweard	Hrethric	Hrothmund	Hrothulf	Froda	Eanmund	Eadgils
Freawaru	Ingeld

== Widsith ==
The poem Widsith also mentions Hroðgar and Hroðulf, but indicates that the feud with Ingeld did not end until the latter was defeated at Heorot:

lines 45–59:
Hroþwulf ond Hroðgar heoldon lengest	Hroðulf and Hroðgar held the longest
sibbe ætsomne suhtorfædran,	peace together, uncle and nephew,
siþþan hy forwræcon wicinga cynn	since they repulsed the Viking-kin
ond Ingeldes ord forbigdan,	and Ingeld to the spear-point made bow,
forheowan æt Heorote Heaðobeardna þrym.	hewn at Heorot Heaðobard's army.

This piece suggests that the conflict between the Scyldings Hroðgar and Hroðulf on one side, and the Heaðobards Froda and Ingeld on the other, was well known in Anglo-Saxon England. This conflict also appears in Scandinavian sources, but in the Norse tradition the Heaðobards had apparently been forgotten and the conflict is instead rendered as a family feud (see Hrólf Kraki's saga and Skjöldunga saga).

== Chronicon Lethrense and Annales Lundenses ==
The Chronicon Lethrense and the included Annales Lundenses tell that Haldan (Healfdene) had two sons, Helghe (Halga) and Ro (Hroðgar). When Haldan died of old age, Helghe and Ro divided the kingdom so that Ro ruled the land, and Helghe the sea. One day, Helghe arrived in Halland/Lolland and slept with Thore, the daughter of one of Ro's farmers. This resulted in a daughter named Yrse. Much later, he met Yrse, and without knowing that she was his daughter, he made her pregnant with Rolf. Eventually, Helghe found out that Yrse was his own daughter and, out of shame, went east and killed himself.

Both Helghe and Ro being dead, a Swedish king, called Hakon in the Chronicon Lethrense proper, and Athisl in the Annales – corresponding to Eadgils – forced the Danes to accept a dog as king. The dog king was succeeded by Rolf Krage.

Rolf Krage was a big man in body and soul and was so generous that no one asked him for anything twice. His sister Skulda was married against Rolf's will to Hartwar or Hiarwarth (Heoroweard), a German earl of Skåne, but reputedly Rolf had given Skulda to him together with Sweden.

This Hartwar arrived in Zealand with a large army and said that he wanted to give his tribute to Rolf, but killed Rolf together with all his men. Only one survived, Wigg, who played along until he was to do homage to Hartwar. Then, he pierced Hartwar with a sword, and so Hartwar was king for only one morning.

== Gesta Danorum ==
The Book 2 of the Gesta Danorum by Saxo Grammaticus contains roughly the same information as the Chronicon Lethrense and the Annales Lundenses, i.e. that Ro (Hroðgar) and Helgo (Halga) were the son of Haldanus (Healfdene). When Haldanus died of old age, Ro took the land and Helgo the water. One day during his sea roving, Helgo arrived at Thurø, where he found and raped the young girl Thora, which resulted in Urse (Yrsa). When Helgo after many years returned to Thurø, Thora avenged her lost virginity by sending Urse to Helgo who, unknowingly raped his own daughter. This resulted in Roluo, who was a gifted man, both physically and intellectually and as brave as he was tall. After some time Helgo repelled a Swedish invasion, avenged Ro by killing the Swedish king Hothbrodd, and made the Swedes pay tribute. However, he committed suicide due to shame for his incestuous relationship with Urse. Roluo succeeded him.

The new king of Sweden, Athislus (Eadgils), thought that the tribute to the Daner might be smaller if he married the Danish king's mother and so took Urse for a queen. However, after some time, Urse was so upset with the Swedish king's greed that she thought out a ruse to run away from the king and at the same time liberate him of his wealth. She incited Athislus to rebel against Roluo, and arranged so that Roluo would be invited and promised a wealth in gifts.

At the banquet Roluo was at first not recognised by his mother, but when their fondness was commented on by Athisl, the Swedish king and Roluo made a wager where Roluo would prove his endurance. Roluo was placed in front of a fire that exposed him to such heat that finally a maiden could suffer the sight no more and extinguished the fire. Roluo was greatly recompensed by Athisl for his endurance.

When the banquet had lasted for three days, Urse and Roluo escaped from Uppsala, early in the morning in carriages where they had put all the Swedish king's treasure. In order to lessen their burden, and to occupy any pursuing warriors they spread gold in their path (later in the work, this is referred to as "sowing the Fyrisvellir"), although there was a rumour that she only spread gilded copper. When Athislus, who was pursuing the escapers saw that a precious ring was lying on the ground, he bent down to pick it up. Roluo was pleased to see the king of Sweden bent down, and escaped in the ships with his mother.

A young man named Wigg was impressed with Roluo's bodily size and gave him the cognomen Krage, which meant a tall tree trunk used as a ladder. Roluo liked this name and rewarded Wigg with a heavy bracelet. Wigg, then, swore to Roluo to avenge him, if he was killed. Roluo later defeated Athislus and gave Sweden to young man named Hiartuar (Heoroweard), who also married Roluo's sister Skulde. Skulde, however, did not like the fact that her husband had to pay taxes to Roluo and so incited Hiartuar to rebel against him. They so went to Lejre (a town which Roluo had built) with arms hidden in the ships, under the pretense that they wanted to pay tribute.

They were well-received, but after the banquet, when most people were drunk asleep, the Swedes and the Goths (i.e. the Geats) proceeded to kill everyone at Roluo's residence. After a long battle, involving Roluo's champion Bjarki, who fought in the shape of a spirit bear until he was awakened by his comrade Hjalti, the Geats won and Roluo was killed.

Hiartuar asked Wigg if he wanted to fight for him, and Wigg said yes. Hiartuar wanted to give Wigg a sword, but he insisted on receiving it by taking the hilt. Having the hilt in his hand, Wigg pierced Hiartuar with the sword and so avenged Roluo. Swedes and Geats then rushed forward and killed Wigg. The Swedish king Høtherus (based on the god Höðr), the brother of Athislus, succeeded Roluo and became the king of a combined Sweden and Denmark.

The family tree of legendary Kings of the Danes, according to the Gesta Danorum (Books 1 to 9)

Kings of the Danes are marked with a crown (♕). Kings of the Swedes are marked with a dagger (†). Superscript numbers after a name indicate in which books of Gesta Danorum the individual is mentioned.

Humblus ♂ ^{(1)}
KEY
Angul ♂ ^{(1)}	♕ Dan I ♂ ^{(1)}	Grytha ♀ ^{(1)}	Marriage or coupling
Parent and child
The Angles	♕ Humblus ♂ ^{(1)}	♕ Lotherus ♂ ^{(1)}	King of the Saxons ♂ ^{(1)}	Succession by other or unclear means
Roarus ♂ ^{(1)}
Sigtrugus, King of the Swedes† ♂ ^{(1)}	♕ Skioldus ♂ ^{(1)}	Alvilda ♀ ^{(1)}
daughter of Roarus ♀ ^{(1)}	Bessus ♂ ^{(1)}
sister of Gram ♀ ^{(1)}	Gro ♀ ^{(1)}	♕ Gram† ♂ ^{(1)}	Sumblus, King of the Finns ♂ ^{(1)}
Wagnofthus ♂ ^{(1)}
Signe ♀ ^{(1)}	Henricus, King of the Saxons ♂ ^{(1)}	Haquinus, King of the Nitherians ♂ ^{(1)}
Harthgrepa ♀ ^{(1)}
♕Suibdagerus, King of Norway† ♂ ^{(1)}	sister of Guthormus ♀ ^{(1)}	♕Guthormus ♂ ^{(1)}	♕Hadingus ♂ ^{(1,2,4,5)}	Regnilda ♀ ^{(1)}
Asmundus† ♂ ^{(1)}	Gunnilda ♀ ^{(1)}	Guthormus ♂ ^{(1)}
Ulvilda ♀ ^{(1,2)}	♕ Ubbo ♂ ^{(2)}
Henricus ♂ ^{(1)}	Uffo† ♂ ^{(1)}	Hundingus† ♂ ^{(1,2)}	Thorilda ♀ ^{(2)}	Scottus ♂ ^{(2)}
daughter of Uffo ♀ ^{(1)}	Regnerus† ♂ ^{(2)}	Suanhuita ♀ ^{(2)}	sisters of Suanhuita ♀♀ ^{(2)}	Andwan, King of the Hellespont ♂ ^{(2)}
Thoraldus ♂ ^{(2)}
♕ Frotho I ♂ ^{(2,5)}	daughter of Andwan ♀ ^{(2)}
Hothbrodus† ♂ ^{(2,3)}	♕ Haldanus I ♂ ^{(2)}	Roe ♂ ^{(2)}	Skato ♂ ^{(2)}
Thora ♀ ^{(2)}
♕ Helgo ♂ ^{(2,3)}	♕ Roe ♂ ^{(2)}
Athislus† ♂ ^{(2,3)}	Ursa ♀ ^{(2)}
King Gevarus ♂ ^{(2,3)}	♕ Rolvo Krake† ♂ ^{(2,3)}	Ruta ♀ ^{(2)}	Biarco ♂ ^{(2)}	Sculda ♀ ^{(2)}	♕Hiarwarthus † ♂ ^{(2,3)}
♕ Hotherus† ♂ ^{(2,3)}	Nanna ♀ ^{(3)}	Herlecus ♂ ^{(3)}	Gericus ♂ ^{(3)}
former King of Britain ♂ ^{(3)}	mother of the King of Britain ♀ ^{(3)}	a slave ♂ ^{(3)}	a bondmaid ♀ ^{(3)}	♕ Roricus Slyngebond ♂ ^{(3)}	Gerwendillus ♂ ^{(3)}
King of Britain ♂ ^{(3,4)}	Queen of Britain ♀ ^{(3,4)}	Gerutha ♀ ^{(3,4)}	Horwendillus ♂ ^{(3,4)}	Fengo ♂ ^{(3,4)}
foster sister of Amlethus ♀ ^{(3,4)}	daughter of the King of Britain ♀ ^{(3,4)}	Amlethus ♂ ^{(3,4)}	Herminthruda, Queen of Scotland ♀ ^{(4)}	♕ Wiglecus ♂ ^{(4)}
son of Amlethus ♂ ^{(4)}	♕Wermundus ♂ ^{(4)}	Frowinus, governor of Sleswik ♂ ^{(4)}
♕ Uffo, or Olavus the Gentle ♂ ^{(4)}	daughter of Frowin ♀ ^{(4)}	Keto ♂ ^{(4)}	Wigo ♂ ^{(4)}
♕ Dan II ♂ ^{(4)}
♕ Huglecus ♂ ^{(4)}
♕ Frotho II, the Vigorous ♂ ^{(4)}
♕ Dan III ♂ ^{(4)}
Craca ♀ ^{(5)}	Regnerus ♂ ^{(5)}	Bracus ♂ ^{(5)}	♕ Fridlevus I, the Swift ♂ ^{(4,5)}	Hun, King of the Huns ♂ ^{(5)}	Hun ♂ ^{(5)}
Gøtarus, King of Norway ♂ ^{(5)}	Westmarus ♂ ^{(5)}	Colo ♂ ^{(5)}	Gøtwara ♀ ^{(5)}
Rollerus ♂ ^{(5)}	Ericus the Shrewd-spoken† ♂ ^{(5,6)}	Gunwara the Fair ♀ ^{(5)}	Alvilda ♀ ^{(5)}	♕ Frotho III ♂ ^{(5,6)}	Hanunda ♀ ^{(5)}	Grep (eldest of three) ♂ ^{(5)}	11 other sons (two named Grep) ♂♂ ^{(5)}
Hythin, King of Tellemark ♂ ^{(6)}	Alvo ♂ ^{(5)}	Ofura ♀ ^{(5)}	Arngrimus ♂ ^{(5)}	Grubbus ♂ ^{(6)}	♕ Hiarnus ♂ ^{(6)}	Amundus, King of Norway ♂ ^{(6)}
child of Hythin ^{(6)}	Haldanus† ♂ ^{(6)}	12 sons, including Angantir ♂♂ ^{(5)}	Ano ♂ ^{(6)}	Iuritha ♀ ^{(6)}	♕ Fridlevus II ♂ ^{(6)}	Frogertha ♀ ^{(6)}
Hanevus, King of Saxony ♂ ^{(6)}	Suertingus, King of Saxony ♂ ^{(6)}	Olavus ♂ ^{(6)}	♕ Frotho IV ♂ ^{(6)}
Sywardus† ♂ ^{(6,7)}	sons of Suertingus ♂♂ ^{(6)}	sister of the sons of Suertingus ♀ ^{(6)}	♕ Ingellus ♂ ^{(6,7)}	Helga ♀ ^{(6)}	Helgo ♂ ^{(6)}	Asa ♀ ^{(6)}
three sons that died in war ♂♂ ^{(7)}	♕ Olavus I ♂ ^{(7)}	Karolus, governor of Gothland ♂ ^{(7)}
Ulvilda ♀ ^{(7)}	♕ Frotho V ♂ ^{(7)}	Hatherus ♂ ^{(7)}	♕ Haraldus I ♂ ^{(7)}	Sygne ♀ ^{(7)}
Ericus† ♂ ^{(7)}	Thorhilda ♀ ^{(7)}	♕ Haldanus II Biargrammus† ♂ ^{(7)}	♕Haraldus II ♂ ^{(7)}
Ebbo ♂ ^{(7)}	mother of Otharus ♀ ^{(7)}	♕ Unguinus, King of the Goths ♂ ^{(7)}	Asmundus ♂ ^{(7)}
sister of Otharus ♀ ^{(7)}	♕ Sywaldus I ♂ ^{(7)}	Sygrutha ♀ ^{(7)}	Kings of Norway
Sywardus, King of the Goths ♂ ^{(7)}	mother of Alvilda ♀ ^{(7)}	Otharus ♂ ^{(7)}	Syritha ♀ ^{(7)}	♕ Sygarus ♂ ^{(7)}	queen of Sygarus ♀ ^{(7)}	Hamundus, a petty king ♂ ^{(7)}
Wemundus ♂ ^{(7)}	Ostenus ♂ ^{(7)}	♕Sywaldus II ♂ ^{(7)}	Algerus ♂ ^{(7)}	Helwin ♂ ^{(7)}	Hamundus ♂ ^{(7)}
Regnaldus, King of the Northmen ♂ ^{(7)}	Alvilda ♀ ^{(7)}	Alf ♂ ^{(7)}	Sygne ♂ ^{(7)}	Hagbarthus ♂ ^{(7)}	Hako ♂ ^{(7)}
Gro ♀ ^{(7)}	Borcarus ♂ ^{(7)}	Drota ♀ ^{(7)}	Gunnarus ♂ ^{(7)}	Hano, ruler of Funen ♂ ^{(7)}	Ostmarus, ruler of Scania ♂ ^{(7)}	Hundingus, ruler of Zealand ♂ ^{(7)}	Roricus, co-ruler of Jutland ♂ ^{(7)}	Hatherus, co-ruler of Jutland ♂ ^{(7)}
Haraldus ♂ ^{(7)}	Hildigerus ♂ ^{(7)}	Røtho, a Ruthenian pirate ♂ ^{(7)}	Wesetus ♂
♕Haldanus III ♂ ^{(7)}	Guritha ♀ ^{(7)}
Alverus† ♂ ^{(7,8)}	♕ Haraldus III Hyldetan ♂ ^{(7)}
Olavus ♂ ^{(7)}	Ingo ♂ ^{(7)}	Ingeldus† ♂ ^{(7)}	sister of Haraldus ♀ ^{(7)}	Ubbo ♂ ^{(7)}	sister of Haraldus ♀ ^{(7)}	Sywardus ♂ ^{(7)}	sister of Haraldus ♀ ^{(7)}	Olavus, king of the Werms ♂ ^{(7)}
♕ Ringo I† ♂ ^{(7,8)}	♕ Hetha ♀ ^{(8)}	♕ Olo the Vigorous ♂ ^{(7,8)}	Esa ♀ ^{(7)}	son of the king ♂ ^{(7,8)}
Atylo the Scanian ♂ ^{(8)}	Ringo, ruler of Norway ♂ ^{(8)}
Tola ♂ ^{(8)}	Omothus, or Homothus ♂ ^{(8)}	daughter of Ringo ♀ ^{(8)}	Esa ♀ ^{(8)}	♕ Omundus ♂ ^{(7,8)}
Sibbo ♂ ^{(8)}	sister of Gøtarus ♀ ^{(8)}	Gøtarus† ♂ ^{(8)}	daughter of Omundus ♀ ^{(8)}	♕ Sywardus I ♂ ^{(8)}	♕ Buthlus ♂ ^{(8)}	daughter of Omundus ♀ ^{(8)}
Ebbo ♂ ^{(8)}
early wife of Iarmericus ♀ ^{(8)}	♕Iarmericus † ♂ ^{(8)}	Suanilda ♀ ^{(8)}	the Hellepontines, 4 brothers ♂♂ ^{(8)}	Iarmericus' sister, sold to Norwegians ♀ ^{(8)}	Iarmericus' sister, sold to Germans ♀ ^{(8)}
♕ Broderus ♂ ^{(8)}	nephews of Iarmericus ♂♂ ^{(8)}
King of the Goths ♂ ^{(8)}	♕ Sywaldus III ♂ ^{(8)}
King of Sweden† ♂ ^{(8)}	daughter of the King of the Goths ♀ ^{(8)}	♕ Snio ♂ ^{(8)}
♕ Biorn ♂ ^{(8)}
♕ Haraldus III ♂ ^{(8)}
a queen from Sweden ♀ ^{(8)}	♕ Gormo I ♂ ^{(8)}
♕ Gotricus, or Godefridus ♂ ^{(8,9)}
♕ Olavus III ♂ ^{(9)}	daughter of Gotricus ♀ ^{(9)}	Sywardus, King of Norway ♂ ^{(9)}	unknown
♕Hemmingus ♂ ^{(9)}	♕Siwardus II Ring ♂ ^{(9)}	♕ Ringo II ♂ ^{(9)}	Herothus† ♂ ^{(9)}	Hesbernus ♂ ^{(9)}
ruler in Norway ♂ ^{(9)}	Lathgertha ♀ ^{(9)}	♕Regnerus Lothbrog ♂ ^{(9)}	Thora ♀ ^{(9)}
Suanlogha ♀ ^{(9)}	a woman ♀ ^{(9)}
2 daughters ♀♀ ^{(9)}	Fridlevus ♂ ^{(9)}	♕ Haraldus ♂ ^{(9)}	♕ Siwardus & Ericus ♂♂ ^{(9)}	Rathbarthus ♂ ^{(9)}	Dunwatus ♂ ^{(9)}	Ubbo ♂ ^{(9)}
Regnaldus ♂ ^{(9)}	Withsercus ♂ ^{(9)}	Ericus Wind-hat ♂ ^{(9)}	Guthormus ♂ ^{(9)}	♕ Ericus I ♂ ^{(9)}	♕ Sywardus Snake-Eye ♂ ^{(9)}	Biornus ♂ ^{(9)}	Agnerus ♂ ^{(9)}	Ivarus ♂ ^{(9)}
daughter of Guthormus ♀ ^{(9)}	♕ Ericus II ♂ ^{(9)}
♕ Kanutus I ♂ ^{(9)}
♕ Frotho VI ♂ ^{(9)}
♕ Gormo II the English ♂ ^{(9)}
♕ Haraldus V ♂ ^{(9)}	Hedelradus, King of England ♂ ^{(9)}
♕ Gormo III ♂ ^{(9)}	Thira ♀ ^{(9)}
Kanutus ♂ ^{(9)}	Haraldus VI ♂ ^{(9)}

Genealogical information is derived from Oliver Elton's 1905 translation, The First Nine Books of the Danish History of Saxo Grammaticus (via Wikisource). Name spellings are from the 1931 Latin critical edition by Olrik and Ræder (via Wikisource). Regnal numbers, which do not appear in the original text, are included for clarity and taken from the engraving Veræ effigies regum omnium by Erico Olai Tormio.

== Hrólfr Kraki's saga ==
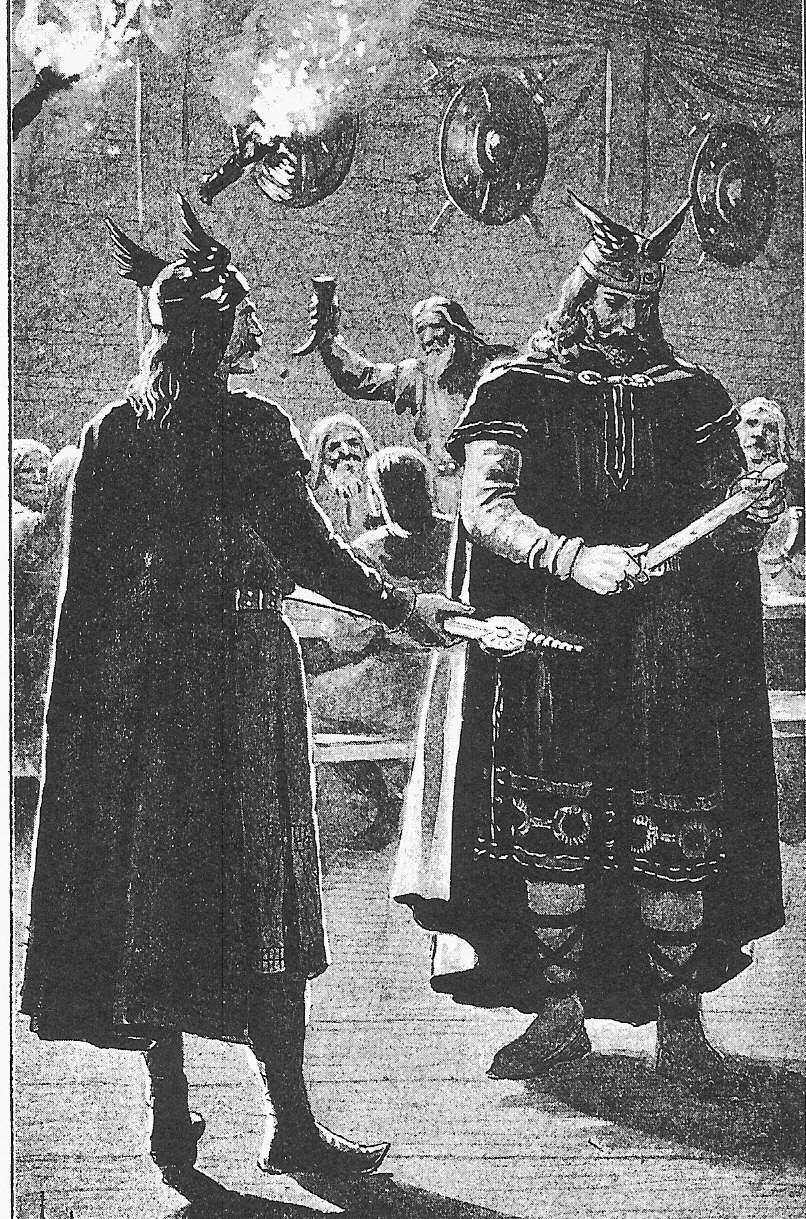
Hjorvard and Hrólfr Kraki, by Jenny Nyström (1895).

In Hrólfr Kraki's saga, Halfdan (Healfdene) had three children, the sons Helgi (Halga) and Hróarr (Hroðgar) and the daughter Signý. The sister was the eldest and married to Sævil Jarl, with whom she had the son Hrókr. Halfdan was murdered by his own brother Fróði (Froda) and the two brothers had to seek refuge with a man called Vivil on an island, until they could avenge their father and kill Fróði. Whereas Hróarr moved to Northumbria and married the king's daughter, Helgi (i.e. Halga) went to the Saxons wanting to woo their warlike queen Oluf. She was, however, not interested and humiliated Helgi by shaving his head and covering him with tar, while he was asleep, and sending him back to his ship. Some time later, Helgi returned and through a ruse, he kidnapped the queen for a while during which time he made her pregnant.

Having returned to her kingdom, the queen bore a child, a girl which she named Yrsa after her dog. Yrsa was set to live as a shepherd, until she was 12 years old, when she met her father Helgi who fell in love with her, not knowing it was his daughter. Oluf kept quiet about the parentage and saw it as her revenge that Helgi would wed his own daughter. Helgi and Yrsa had the son Hrólfr.

Learning that Helgi and Yrsa lived happily together, queen Oluf travelled to Denmark to tell her daughter the truth. Yrsa was shocked and although Helgi wanted their relationship to remain as it was, Yrsa insisted on leaving him to live alone. She was later taken by the Swedish king Aðils (Eadgils) as his queen, which made Helgi even more unhappy. Helgi went to Uppsala to fetch her, but was killed by Aðils in battle. In Lejre, he was succeeded by his son Hrólfr.

Hrólfr soon assembled twelve great berserkers named Hrómundr harði, Hrólfr skjóthendi, Svipdagr, Beigaðr, Hvítserkr inn hvati, Haklangr, Harðrefill, Haki inn frækni, Vöttr inn mikilaflaði, Starólfr, Hjalti inn hugprúði and Bödvar Bjarki.

After some time, Bödvar Bjarki encouraged Hrólfr to go Uppsala to claim the gold that Aðils had taken from Helgi after the battle. Hrólfr departed with 120 men and his twelve berserkers and during a rest they were tested by a farmer called Hrani (Odin in disguise) who advised Hrólfr to send back all his troops but his twelve berserkers, as numbers would not help him against Aðils.

They were at first well received, but in his hall, Aðils did his best to stop Hrólfr with pit traps and hidden warriors who attacked the Danes. Finally Aðils entertained them but put them to a test where they had to endure immense heat by a fire. Hrólfr and his berserkers finally had enough and threw the courtiers, who were feeding the fire, into the fire and leapt at Aðils. The Swedish king disappeared through a hollow tree trunk that stood in his hall.

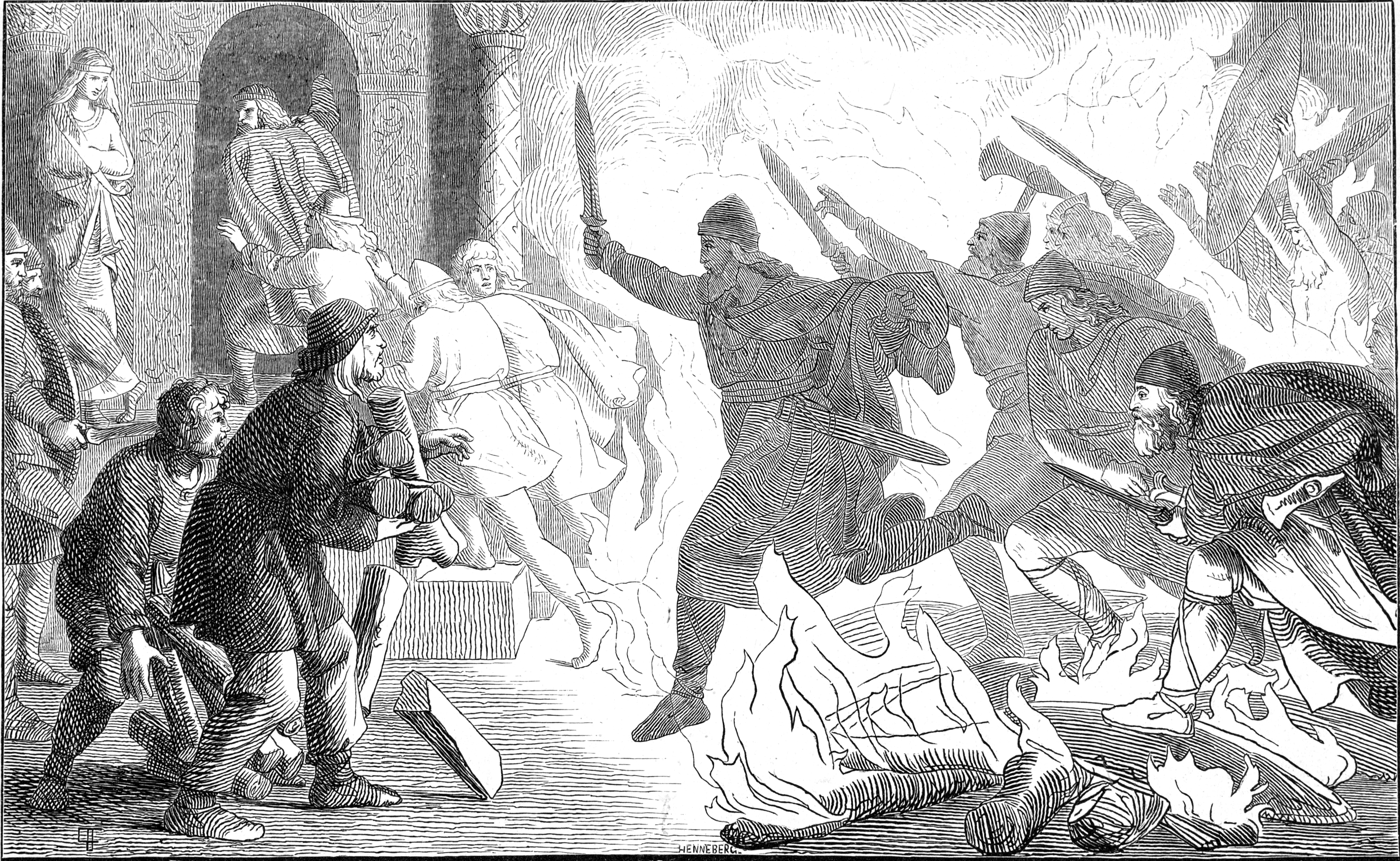
Hrólfr Kraki and his warriors leap across the flames. Illustration by the Danish Lorenz Frølich in a 19th-century book.

Yrsa admonished Aðils for wanting to kill her son, and went to meet the Danes. She gave them a man named Vöggr to entertain them. This Vöggr remarked that Hrólfr had the thin face of a pole ladder, a Kraki. Happy with his new cognomen Hrólfr gave Vöggr a golden ring, and Vöggr swore to avenge Hrólfr if anyone should kill him. Hrólfr and his company were then attacked by a troll in the shape of a boar in the service of Aðils, but Hrólfr's dog Gram killed it.

They then found out that Aðils had set the hall on fire, and so they broke out of the hall, only to find themselves surrounded by heavily armed warriors in the street. After a fight, king Aðils retreated to summon reinforcements.

Yrsa then provided her son with a silver drinking horn filled with gold and jewels and a famous ring, Svíagris. Then she gave Hrólf and his men twelve of the Swedish king's best horses, and all the armour and provisions they needed.

Hrólfr took a fond farewell of his mother and departed over the Fyrisvellir. When they saw Aðils and his warriors in pursuit, they spread the gold behind themselves. Aðils saw his precious Svíagris on the ground and stooped to pick it up with his spear, whereupon Hrólf cut his back with his sword and screamed in triumph that he had bent the back of the most powerful man in Sweden.

Hrólfr lived in peace for some time. However, his half-elven half-sister Skuld was married to Hjörvarðr (Heoroweard) one of Hrólfr's subkings, and she began to turn her husband against Hrólfr. Under the pretext that they would wait three years before paying the accumulated tribute at one time, Skuld assembled a large army which included strong warriors, criminals, elves and norns. She used seiðr (witchcraft) to hide the great muster from Hrólfr and his champions.

They then arrived at Lejre one yule for the midwinter celebrations, with all the weapons hidden in wagons. A fight started and like in the account found in Gesta Danorum, Bödvar Bjarki fought in the shape of a spirit bear until he was awakened by Hjalti. Skuld used her witchcraft to resuscitate her fallen warriors and after a long fight Hrólfr and all his berserkers fell.

Skuld became the ruler of Denmark but did not rule well. Bödvar Bjarki's brothers Elk-Froði and Þorir Houndsfoot went to Denmark to avenge their brother. The Swedish queen Yrsa gave them a large Swedish army headed by Vöggr. They captured Skuld before she could use her magic and tortured her to death. Then they raised a mound for Hrólfr Kraki where he was buried together with his sword Skofnung.

The family tree of legendary Kings of the Danes, according to Hrólfs saga kraka

Kings of the Danes are marked with a crown (♕).

Sigríðr ♀	♕ Hálfdan ♂	♕ Fróði ♂	KEY
Marriage or coupling
Sævil jarl ♂	Signý ♀	Norðri, a King in England ♂	Ólöf, Queen of Saxland ♀	Parent and child
Hrókr ♂	Ögn ♀	♕ Hróarr ♂	♕ Helgi ♂	Yrsa ♀	Aðils, King of Sweden ♂	King of the Finns ♂	Ingibjörg ♀
Agnarr ♂	An elf-woman ♀	King Hring ♂	Hvít ♀
Hjörvarðr, a king ♂	♕ Skuld ♀	♕ Hrólfr Kraki ♂	Björn ♂	Bera, a farmer's daughter ♀
♕ Skúr ♀	♕ Drífa ♀	Böðvarr ♂	Elg-Fróði ♂	Þórir Houndsfoot ♂

The source used for the genealogical information is the English translation by Peter Tunstall, and spellings are from the Old Norse edition edited by Guðni Jónsson.

== Skjöldunga saga ==
Hrólf's parents Halga and Yrsa, by Jenny Nyström (1895).

The Skjöldunga saga relates that Helgo (Halga) was the king of Denmark together with his brother Roas (Hroðgar). Helgo raped Olava, the queen of the Saxons, and she bore a daughter named Yrsa. The girl later married king Adillus (Eadgils), the king of Sweden, with whom she had the daughter Scullda.

Some years later, Helgo attacked Sweden and captured Yrsa, not knowing that she was his own daughter. He raped her and took her back to Denmark, where she bore the son Rolfo. After a few years, Yrsa's mother, queen Olava, came to visit her and told her that Helgo was her own father. In horror, Yrsa returned to Adillus, leaving her son behind. Helgo died when Rolfo was eight years old, and Rolfo succeeded him, and ruled together with his uncle Roas. Not much later, Roas was killed by his half-brothers Rærecus and Frodo, whereupon Rolfo became the sole king of Denmark.

In Sweden, Yrsa and Adillus married Scullda to the king of Öland, Hiørvardus (also called Hiorvardus and Hevardus, and who corresponds to Heoroweard in Beowulf). As her half-brother Rolfo was not consulted about this marriage, he was infuriated and he attacked Öland and made Hiørvardus and his kingdom tributary to Denmark.

After some time Adillus requested Rolfo's aid against king Ale (Onela) of Oppland, and Rolfo sent him his berserkers. Adillus then won the war, but refused to pay the expected tribute for the help and so Rolfo came to Uppsala to claim his recompense. After surviving some traps, Rolfo fled with Adillus' gold, helped by his mother Yrsa, and "sowed" it on the Fyrisvellir.

Hiørvardus and his queen Skullda rebelled against Rolfo and killed him. However, Hiørvardus did not live long after this and was killed. Rolfo was succeeded by his father's cousin Rörek, who, however, had to leave Skåne to Valdar and could only keep Zealand.

== Skáldskaparmál ==
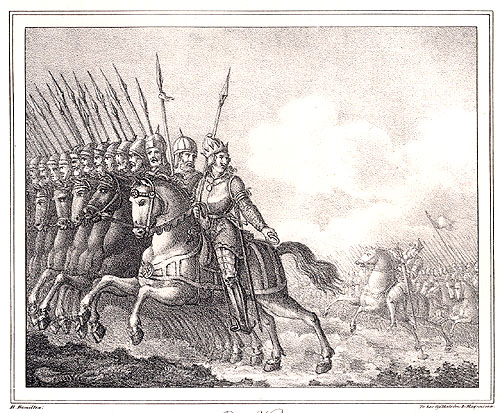
"Rolf Krake sår guld på Fyrisvall" (1830) by Huge Hamilton. Hrolf Kraki fleeing the Swedish king Adils on the Fýrisvellir.

In the Skáldskaparmál by Snorri Sturluson, the story of Hrólfr Kraki is presented in order to explain why gold was known by the kenning Kraki's seed.

Snorri relates that Hrólfr was the most renowned king in Denmark for valour, generosity and graciousness. One day a poor boy called Vöggr arrived and expressed his surprise that such a great king would look like a little pole (kraki). Hrólfr said that Vöggr had given him a name and gave Vöggr a golden ring in recompense. In gratitude Vöggr swore to Hrólfr to avenge him, should he be killed.

A second tale was when the king of Sweden, Aðils (Eadgils), was in war with a Norwegian king named Áli (Onela), and they fought in the Battle on the Ice of Lake Vänern. Aðils was married to Yrsa, the mother of Hrólfr and so sent an embassy to Hrólfr asking him for help against Áli. He would receive three valuable gifts in recompense. Hrólfr was involved in a war against the Saxons and could not come in person but sent his twelve berserkers. Áli died in the war, and Aðils took Áli's helmet Battle-boar and his horse Raven. The berserkers demanded three pounds of gold each in pay, and they demanded to choose the gifts that Aðils had promised Hrólfr, that is the two pieces of armour that nothing could pierce: the helmet battle-boar and the mailcoat Finn's heritage. They also wanted the famous ring Svíagris. Aðils considered the pay outrageous and refused.

When Hrólfr heard that Aðils refused to pay, he set off to Uppsala. They brought the ships to the river Fyris and rode directly to the Swedish king's hall at Uppsala with his twelve berserkers. Yrsa welcomed them and led them to their lodgings. Fires were prepared for them and they were given drinks. However, so much wood was heaped on the fires that the clothes started to burn away from their bodies. Hrólfr and his men had enough and threw the courtiers on the fire. Yrsa arrived and gave them a horn full of gold, the ring Svíagris and asked them to flee. As they rode over the Fyrisvellir, they saw Aðils and his men pursuing them. The fleeing men threw their gold on the plain so that the pursuers would stop to collect the gold. Aðils, however, continued the chase on his horse Slöngvir. Hrólfr then threw Svíagris and saw how Aðils stooped down to pick up the ring with his spear. Hrólfr exclaimed that he had seen the mightiest man in Sweden bend his back.

== Ynglinga saga ==
The Skjöldunga saga was used by Snorri Sturluson as a source when he told the story of Aðils (Eadgils) and Yrsa, in his Ynglinga saga, a part of the Heimskringla. What remains of the Skjöldunga saga is a Latin summary by Arngrímur Jónsson, and so the two versions are basically the same, the main difference being that Arngrímur's version is more terse.

Snorri relates that Aðils betook himself to pillage the Saxons, whose king was Geirþjófr and queen Alof the Great. The king and consort were not at home, and so Aðils and his men plundered their residence at ease driving cattle and captives down to the ships. One of the captives was a remarkably beautiful girl named Yrsa, and Snorri writes that everyone was soon impressed with the well-mannered, pretty and intelligent girl. Most impressed was Aðils who made her his queen.

Some years later, Helgi (Halga), who ruled in Lejre, attacked Sweden and captured Yrsa. He raped Yrsa, his own daughter, and took her back to Lejre, where they had a son, Hrólfr. When the boy was three years of age, Yrsa's mother, queen Alof of Saxony, came to visit her and told her that her husband Helgi was her own father. Horrified, Yrsa returned to Aðils, leaving her son behind, and stayed in Sweden for the rest of her life. When Hrólfr was eight years old, Helgi died during a war expedition and Hrólf was proclaimed king.

Snorri finishes his account by briefly mentioning that the Skjöldunga saga contained an extensive account of how Hrólf came to Uppsala and sowed gold on the Fyrisvellir.

== Gróttasöngr ==
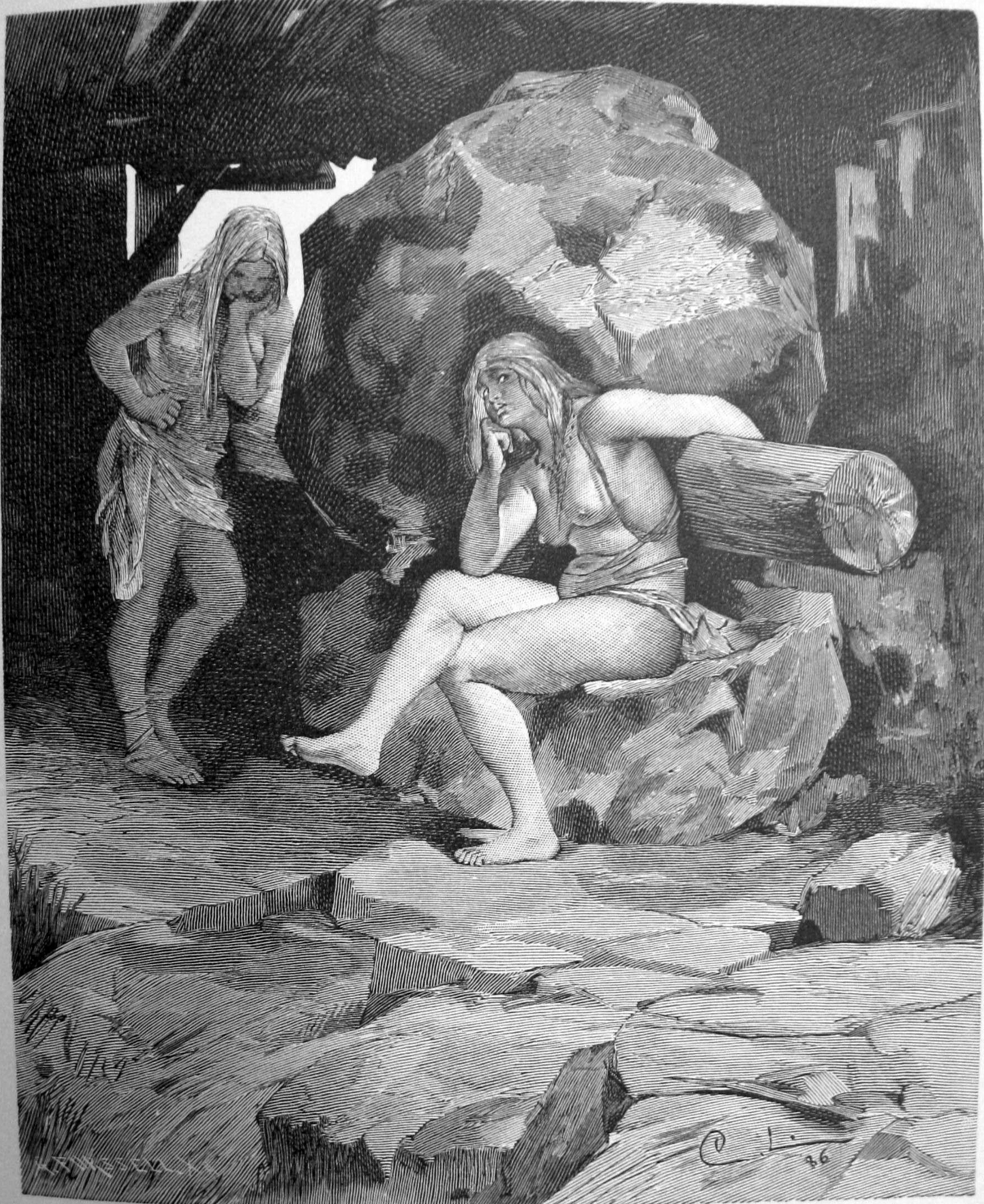
Fenja and Menja at the mill

The Gróttasöngr contains a stanza (nr 22) sung by the giantesses Fenja and Menja. It only names Yrsa and the situation that her son and brother (i.e. Hroðulf) will avenge Fródi (Froda):

Mölum enn framar. Mun Yrsu sonr, niðr Halfdanar, hefna Fróða; sá mun hennar heitinn verða burr ok bróðir, vitum báðar þat.	Let us grind on! Yrsa's son, Hálfdan's kinsman, will avenge Fródi: he will of her be called son and brother: we both know that.(Thorpe's translation)

This piece cannot refer to Hrólfr Kraki's saga where Froda was the half-brother of Healfdene because this Froda was killed by Hroðgar (and therefore they avenged him). It can, however, be interpreted through the Skjöldunga saga in which Hroðulf's uncle Hroðgar was murdered by his half-brother Froda.

Either Frodi's death is the one they want to avenge, or they seek vengeance for Hroðgar, killed by his half brother. The Danish equivalent of hefna is at hævne, meaning revenge (or avenging), in this case for Fródi's murder, indicating no relation to Hroðgars death, but to Frodi's. 'Kin' and 'kinsmen' share a certain reference to blood relation, yet 'brother' can also have the meaning of either: 'one of us' and 'our tribesmen', or simply 'son and brother'. After being recognized for his deeds, Yrsa will see Hroðulf as her son once more.

== Gautreks saga ==
Hrólfr Kraki is mentioned briefly in Gautreks saga, written around 1300, when the adventurer Ref comes to him with a gift consisting of two dogs. In return for this gift Hrólfr gives him a helmet and a chainmail, both made of red gold.

== Modern references ==
Danish playwright Johannes Ewald wrote a play about Rolf Krage (1770), based on Saxo's version of the story in Gesta Danorum. Danish poet Adam Oehlenschläger wrote a poem, Helge: et Digt (1814).

The American writer Poul Anderson used this story in his novel Hrolf Kraki's Saga (1973). Anderson's story begins in earlier generations and more or less follows the version in Hrolfr Kraki's Saga described above. The book was well received by many fantasy fans.

"Sellic Spell', a fictionalized treatment of the story by J. R. R. Tolkien, was published in Beowulf: A Translation and Commentary on May 22, 2014, Tolkien himself explaining that his was "a limited...attempt to reconstruct the Anglo-Saxon tale that lies behind the folk-tale element in Beowulf".

The Danish Navy's first ironclad warship was named Rolf Krake.

In the 2022 video game God of War Ragnarök, Hrólfr is featured as a malevolent ghostly berserker and the final opponent in a series of side-quests involving him and his twelve lieutenants.

== Bibliography and external links ==
- English translations of the Old Norse Hrólfs saga kraka ok kappa hans :
  - The Saga of Hrolf Kraki and his Champions. Trans. Peter Tunstall (2003). Available at Norse saga: The Saga of Hrolf Kraki and Northvegr: The Saga of Hrolf Kraki.
  - The Saga of King Hrolf Kraki. Trans. Jesse L. Byock (1998). London: Penguin. ISBN 0-14-043593-X. Selection from this translation are available at The Viking Site: Excerpts from The Saga of King Hrolf Kraki.
  - "King Hrolf and his champions" included in Eirik the Red: And Other Icelandic Sagas. Trans. Gwyn Jones (1961). Oxford: Oxford World's Classics, Oxford University Press. ISBN 0-19-283530-0.
- Original texts:
  - Hrólfs saga kraka ok kappa hans in Old Norse from heimskringla.no
  - Hrólfs saga kraka ok kappa hans in Old Norse from heimskringla.no
  - University of Oregon: Norse: Fornaldarsögur norðurlanda: Hrólfs saga kraka ok kappa hans
  - Sagnanet: Hrólfs saga kraka
- Anderson, Poul (1973). Hrolf Kraki's Saga. New York: Ballantine Books. ISBN 0-345-23562-2. New York: Del Rey Books. ISBN 0-345-25846-0. Reprinted 1988 by Baen Books, ISBN 0-671-65426-8.
- Literary Encyclopedia entry
- Birger Nerman, 1925, Det svenska rikets uppkomst (in Swedish)
- Beowulf:
- Beowulf read aloud in Old English
  - Modern English translation by Francis Barton Gummere
  - Modern English translation by John Lesslie Hall
  - Ringler, Dick. Beowulf: A New Translation For Oral Delivery, May 2005. Searchable text with full audio available, from the University of Wisconsin-Madison Libraries.
  - Several different Modern English translations
- Chronicon Lethrense and Annales Lundense:
  - Chronicon Lethrense and Annales Lundense in translation by Peter Tunstall
  - The same translation at Northvegr
- Book 2 of Gesta Danorum at the Online and Medieval & Classical library
- The Relation of the Hrolfs Saga Kraka and the Bjarkarimur to Beowulf by Olson, 1916, at Project Gutenberg
- the Ynglinga saga in translation by Samuel Laing, 1844, at Northvegr
- The Gróttasöngr in Thorpe's translation
- Skáldskaparmál:
  - Snorri Sturluson's Prose Edda in the original language
  - CyberSamurai Encyclopedia of Norse Mythology: Prose Edda - Skáldskaparmál (English)
  - CyberSamurai Encyclopedia of Norse Mythology: Prose Edda - Skáldskaparmál (Old Norse)
- Malone, Kemp. Studies in Heroic Legend and in Current Speech. S. Einarsson & N.E. Eliason, eds. Copenhagen: Rosenkilde & Bagger, 1959.
- Lukman, Niels Clausen. Skjoldunge und Skilfinge. Hunnen- und Heruler-könige in Ostnordischer Überlieferung. Classica et Mediaevalia, dissertationes III. Copenhagen: Gyldendalske Boghandel Nordisk Forlag, 1943.
- Hemmingsen, Lars. By Word of Mouth: the origins of Danish legendary history - studies in European learned and popular traditions of Dacians and Danes before A.D. 1200. Ph.D. dissertation, University of Copenhagen (Dept. of Folklore), 1995.
- Anderson, Carl Edlund. Formation and Resolution of Ideological Contrast in the Early History of Scandinavia. Ph.D. thesis, University of Cambridge, Department of Anglo-Saxon, Norse & Celtic (Faculty of English).
- Overing, Gillian R., and Marijane Osborn. 'Landscape of Desire: Partial Stories of the Medieval Scandinavian World.' Minneapolis: University of Minnesota Press, 1994: 1-37. (possible sailing times and the account of a "Beowulfian" voyage on the Cattegat)

Legendary titles
Preceded by Hroðgar and Halga	King of Denmark in Gesta Danorum	Succeeded by Høtherus
Preceded by Snær	King of Denmark in Chronicon Lethrense	Unknown
Unknown	King of Scania	Succeeded by Valdar
