= Höðr =

Norse deity

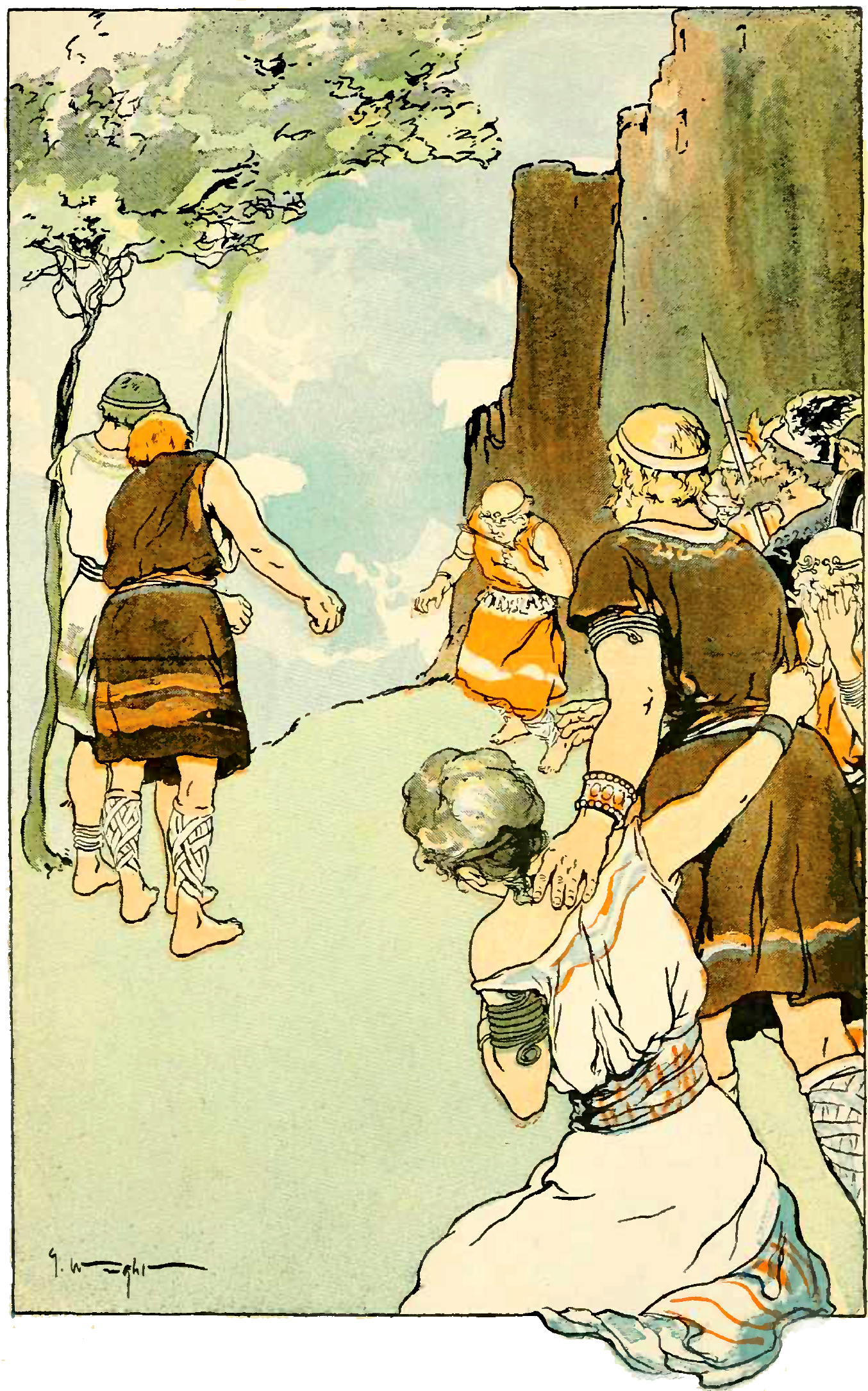
Höðr fatally shoots Baldr, his hand guided by Loki; illustration by George Wright (1908)

Höðr (Old Norse: Hǫðr [ˈhɔðz̠], Latin Hotherus; often anglicized as Hod, Hoder, or Hodur) (Note: The name Höðr is thought to be related to höð, "battle", and mean something like "killer". This would seem to fit with the god's mythological role. In the standardized Old Norse orthography the name is spelled Hǫðr but the letter ⟨ǫ⟩ is frequently replaced with the Modern Icelandic ⟨ö⟩ for reasons of familiarity or technical expediency. The name can be represented in English texts as Hod, Hoder, Hodur, Hodr, Hödr, Höd or Hoth or less commonly as Hödur, Hödhr, Höder, Hothr, Hodhr, Hodh, Hother, Höthr, Höth or Hödh. In the reconstructed pronunciation of Old Norse Hǫðr is pronounced [ˈhɔðr], while the Icelandic pronunciation is [ˈhœːðʏr̥], corresponding to the Icelandic spelling Höður. The various anglicizations are pronounced in an ad hoc fashion according to the taste and dialect of the speaker.) is a god in Norse mythology. The blind son of Odin, he is tricked and guided by Loki into shooting a mistletoe arrow that kills the otherwise invulnerable Baldr.

According to the Prose Edda and the Poetic Edda, the goddess Frigg, Baldr's mother, made everything in existence swear never to harm Baldr, except for the mistletoe, which she found too unimportant to ask (alternatively, which she found too young to demand an oath from). The gods amused themselves by trying weapons on Baldr and seeing them fail to do any harm. Loki, the mischief-maker, upon finding out about Baldr's one weakness, made a dart from mistletoe, and helped Höðr shoot it at Baldr. In reaction to this, Odin conceived a son by Rindr, Váli, who grew to adulthood within a day and slew Höðr.

The Danish historian Saxo Grammaticus recorded an alternative version of this myth in his Gesta Danorum. In this version, the mortal hero Hotherus and the demi-god Balderus compete for the hand of Nanna. Ultimately, Hotherus slays Balderus.

== Name ==
The theonym Hǫðr can be translated as 'warrior' or 'battle'. Jan de Vries and Vladimir Orel write that is related to Old Norse hǫð ('war, slaughter') and to Old English heaðu-deór ('brave, stout in war'), from Proto-Germanic *haþuz ('battle'; cf. Old High German hadu-, Old Saxon hathu-, Old Frisian -had, Burgundian *haþus).

== Attestations ==
=== Prose Edda ===
In the Gylfaginning part of Snorri Sturluson's Prose Edda, Höðr is introduced in an ominous way.

Höðr heitir einn ássinn, hann er blindr. Œrit er hann styrkr, en vilja mundu goðin at þenna ás þyrfti eigi at nefna, þvíat hans handaverk munu lengi vera höfð at minnum með goðum ok mönnum. — Eysteinn Björnsson's edition

"One of the Æsir is named Hödr: He is blind. He is of sufficient strength, but the gods would desire that no occasion should rise of naming this god, for the work of his hands shall long be held in memory among gods and men." — Brodeur's translation

Höðr is not mentioned again until the prelude to Baldr's death is described. All things except the mistletoe (believed to be harmless) have sworn an oath not to harm Baldr, so the Æsir throw missiles at him for sport.

En Loki tók mistiltein ok sleit upp ok gekk til þings. En Höðr stóð útarliga í mannhringinum, þvíat hann var blindr. Þá mælti Loki við hann: "Hví skýtr þú ekki at Baldri?" Hann svarar: "Þvíat ek sé eigi hvar Baldr er, ok þat annat at ek em vápnlauss." Þá mælti Loki: "Gerðu þó í líking annarra manna ok veit Baldri sœmð sem aðrir menn. Ek mun vísa þér til hvar hann stendr. Skjót at honum vendi þessum."

Höðr tók mistiltein ok skaut at Baldri at tilvísun Loka. Flaug skotit í gögnum hann ok fell hann dauðr til jarðar. Ok hefir þat mest óhapp verit unnit með goðum ok mönnum. — Eysteinn Björnsson's edition

"Loki took Mistletoe and pulled it up and went to the Thing.

Hödr stood outside the ring of men, because he was blind. Then spake Loki to him: 'Why dost thou not shoot at Baldr?' He answered: 'Because I see not where Baldr is; and for this also, that I am weaponless.' Then said Loki: 'Do thou also after the manner of other men, and show Baldr honor as the other men do. I will direct thee where he stands; shoot at him with this wand.' Hödr took Mistletoe and shot at Baldr, being guided by Loki: The shaft flew through Baldr, and he fell dead to the earth; and that was the greatest mischance that has ever befallen among gods and men." — Brodeur's translation

The Gylfaginning does not say what happens to Höðr after this. In fact it specifically states that Baldr cannot be avenged, at least not immediately.

Þá er Baldr var fallinn, þá fellusk öllum ásum orðtök ok svá hendr at taka til hans, ok sá hverr til annars ok váru allir með einum hug til þess er unnit hafði verkit. En engi mátti hefna, þar var svá mikill griðastaðr. — Eysteinn Björnsson's edition

"Then, when Baldr was fallen, words failed all the Æsir, and their hands likewise to lay hold of him; each looked at the other, and all were of one mind as to him who had wrought the work, but none might take vengeance, so great a sanctuary was in that place." — Brodeur's translation

It does seem, however, that Höðr ends up in Hel one way or another for the last mention of him in Gylfaginning is in the description of the post-Ragnarök world.

Því næst koma þar Baldr ok Höðr frá Heljar, setjask þá allir samt ok talask við ok minnask á rúnar sínar ok rœða of tíðindi þau er fyrrum höfðu verit, of Miðgarðsorm ok um Fenrisúlf. — Eysteinn Björnsson's edition

"After that Baldr shall come thither, and Hödr, from Hel; then all shall sit down together and hold speech with one another, and call to mind their secret wisdom, and speak of those happenings which have been before: of the Midgard Serpent and of Fenris-Wolf." — Brodeur's translation

Snorri's source of this knowledge is clearly Völuspá as quoted below.

In the Skáldskaparmál section of the Prose Edda, several kennings for Höðr are listed.

Hvernig skal kenna Höð? Svá, at kalla hann blinda ás, Baldrs bana, skjótanda Mistilteins, son Óðins, Heljar sinna, Vála dólg. — Guðni Jónsson's edition

"How should one periphrase Hödr? Thus: by calling him the Blind God, Baldr's Slayer, Thrower of the Mistletoe, Son of Odin, Companion of Hel, Foe of Váli." — Brodeur's translation

None of those kennings, however, are actually found in surviving skaldic poetry. Neither are Snorri's kennings for Váli, which are also of interest in this context.

Hvernig skal kenna Vála? Svá, at kalla hann son Óðins ok Rindar, stjúpson Friggjar, bróður ásanna, hefniás Baldrs, dólg Haðar ok bana hans, byggvanda föðurtófta. — Guðni Jónsson's edition

"How should Váli be periphrased? Thus: by calling him Son of Odin and Rindr, Stepson of Frigg, Brother of the Æsir, Baldr's Avenger, Foe and Slayer of Hödr, Dweller in the Homesteads of the Fathers." — Brodeur's translation

It is clear from this that Snorri was familiar with the role of Váli as Höðr's slayer, even though he does not relate that myth in the Gylfaginning prose. His emphasis is rather on the impossibility of restoring Höðr to life, despite his godhood.

=== Poetic Edda ===
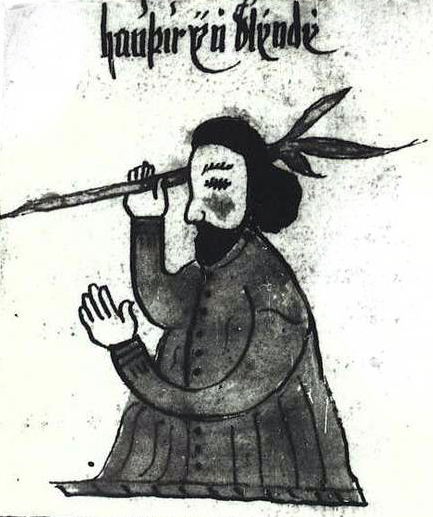
Höðr and the mistletoe in a 17th-century Icelandic manuscript

Höðr is referred to several times in the Poetic Edda, always in the context of Baldr's death. The following strophes are from Völuspá.

Ek sá Baldri, blóðgom tívur, Óðins barni, ørlög fólgin: stóð um vaxinn völlum hærri mjór ok mjök fagr mistilteinn. Varð af þeim meiði, er mær sýndisk, harmflaug hættlig: Höðr nam skjóta. Baldrs bróðir var of borinn snemma, sá nam, Óðins sonr, einnættr vega. Þó hann æva hendr né höfuð kembði, áðr á bál um bar Baldrs andskota. En Frigg um grét í Fensölum vá Valhallar - vituð ér enn, eða hvat?: Eysteinn Björnsson's edition	I saw for Baldr, the bleeding god, The son of Othin, his destiny set: Famous and fair in the lofty fields, Full grown in strength the mistletoe stood. From the branch which seemed so slender and fair Came a harmful shaft that Hoth should hurl; But the brother of Baldr was born ere long, And one night old fought Othin's son. His hands he washed not, his hair he combed not, Till he bore to the bale-blaze Baldr's foe. But in Fensalir did Frigg weep sore For Valhall's need: would you know yet more?: Bellows' translation	I saw for Baldr— for the bloodstained sacrifice, Óðinn's child— the fates set hidden. There stood full-grown, higher than the plains, slender and most fair, the mistletoe. There formed from that stem which was slender-seeming, a shaft of anguish, perilous: Hǫðr started shooting. A brother of Baldr was born quickly: he started—Óðinn's son— slaying, at one night old. He never washed hands, never combed head, till he bore to the pyre Baldr's adversary— while Frigg wept in Fen Halls for Valhǫll's woe. Do you still seek to know? And what?: Ursula Dronke's translation

This account seems to fit well with the information in the Prose Edda, but here the role of Baldr's avenging brother is emphasized.

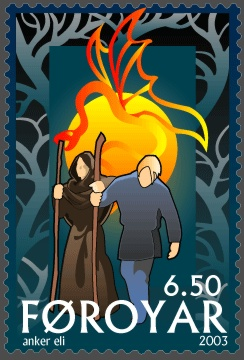
Baldr and Höðr return together after Ragnarök in a Faroese stamp by Anker Eli Petersen (2003)

Baldr and Höðr are also mentioned in Völuspá's description of the world after Ragnarök.

Munu ósánir akrar vaxa, böls mun alls batna, Baldr mun koma. Búa þeir Höðr ok Baldr Hropts sigtóptir vel, valtívar - vituð ér enn, eða hvat? – Eysteinn Björnsson's edition	Unsown shall the fields bring forth, all evil be amended; Baldr shall come; Hödr and Baldr, the heavenly gods, Hropt's glorious dwellings shall inhabit. Understand ye yet, or what? – Thorpe's translation

The poem Vafþrúðnismál informs us that the gods who survive Ragnarök are Viðarr, Váli, Móði and Magni, with no mention of Höðr and Baldr.

The myth of Baldr's death is also referred to in another Eddic poem, Baldrs draumar.

Óðinn kvað: "Þegj-at-tu, völva, þik vil ek fregna, unz alkunna, vil ek enn vita: Hverr mun Baldri at bana verða ok Óðins son aldri ræna?" Völva kvað: "Höðr berr hávan hróðrbaðm þinig, hann mun Baldri at bana verða ok Óðins son aldri ræna; nauðug sagðak, nú mun ek þegja." Óðinn kvað: "Þegj-at-tu, völva, þik vil ek fregna, unz alkunna, vil ek enn vita: Hverr mun heift Heði hefnt of vinna eða Baldrs bana á bál vega?" Völva kvað: Rindr berr Vála í vestrsölum, sá mun Óðins sonr einnættr vega: hönd of þvær né höfuð kembir, áðr á bál of berr Baldrs andskota; nauðug sagðak, nú mun ek þegja." – Guðni Jónsson's edition	Vegtam "Be thou not silent, Vala! I will question thee, until I know all. I will yet know who will Baldr's slayer be, and Odin's son of life bereave." Vala "Hödr will hither his glorious brother (Note: The quoted translation renders the word hróðrbaðm as 'glorious brother', but most translations do not explicitly refer to a sibling relationship between Baldr and Hödr. The 1936 translation by Henry Adams Bellows renders hróðrbaðm as 'far-famed branch', the 2020 translation by Eiður Eyþórsson renders it as 'famous tree', and the 2023 translation by Edward Pettit renders it as 'glory-tree'.) send, he of Baldr will the slayer be, and Odin's son of life bereave. By compulsion I have spoken; I will now be silent." Vegtam "Be not silent, Vala! I will question thee, until I know all. I will yet know who on Hödr vengeance will inflict or Baldr's slayer raise on the pile." Vala "Rind a son shall bear, in the western halls: he shall slay Odin's son, when one night old. He a hand will not wash, nor his head comb, ere he to the pile has borne Baldr's adversary. By compulsion I have spoken; I will now be silent." – Thorpe's translation

Höðr is not mentioned again by name in the Eddas. He is, however, referred to in Völuspá in skamma.

Váru ellifu æsir talðir, Baldr er hné, við banaþúfu; þess lézk Váli verðr at hefna, síns of bróður sló hann handbana. – Guðni Jónsson's edition	There were eleven Æsir reckoned, when Baldr on the pile was laid; him Vali showed himself worthy to avenge, his own brother: he the slayer slew. – Thorpe's translation

=== Skaldic poetry ===
The name Höðr occurs in skaldic poetry as a part of warrior-kennings. Thus Höðr brynju, "Höðr of a byrnie", is a warrior and so is Höðr víga, "Höðr of battle". Some scholars have found the fact that the poets should want to compare warriors with Höðr to be incongruous with Snorri's description of him as a blind god, unable to harm anyone without assistance. It is possible that this indicates that some of the poets were familiar with other myths about Höðr than the one related in Gylfaginning – perhaps some where Höðr has a more active role. On the other hand, the names of many gods occur in kennings and the poets might not have been particular in using any god name as a part of a kenning.

=== Gesta Danorum ===
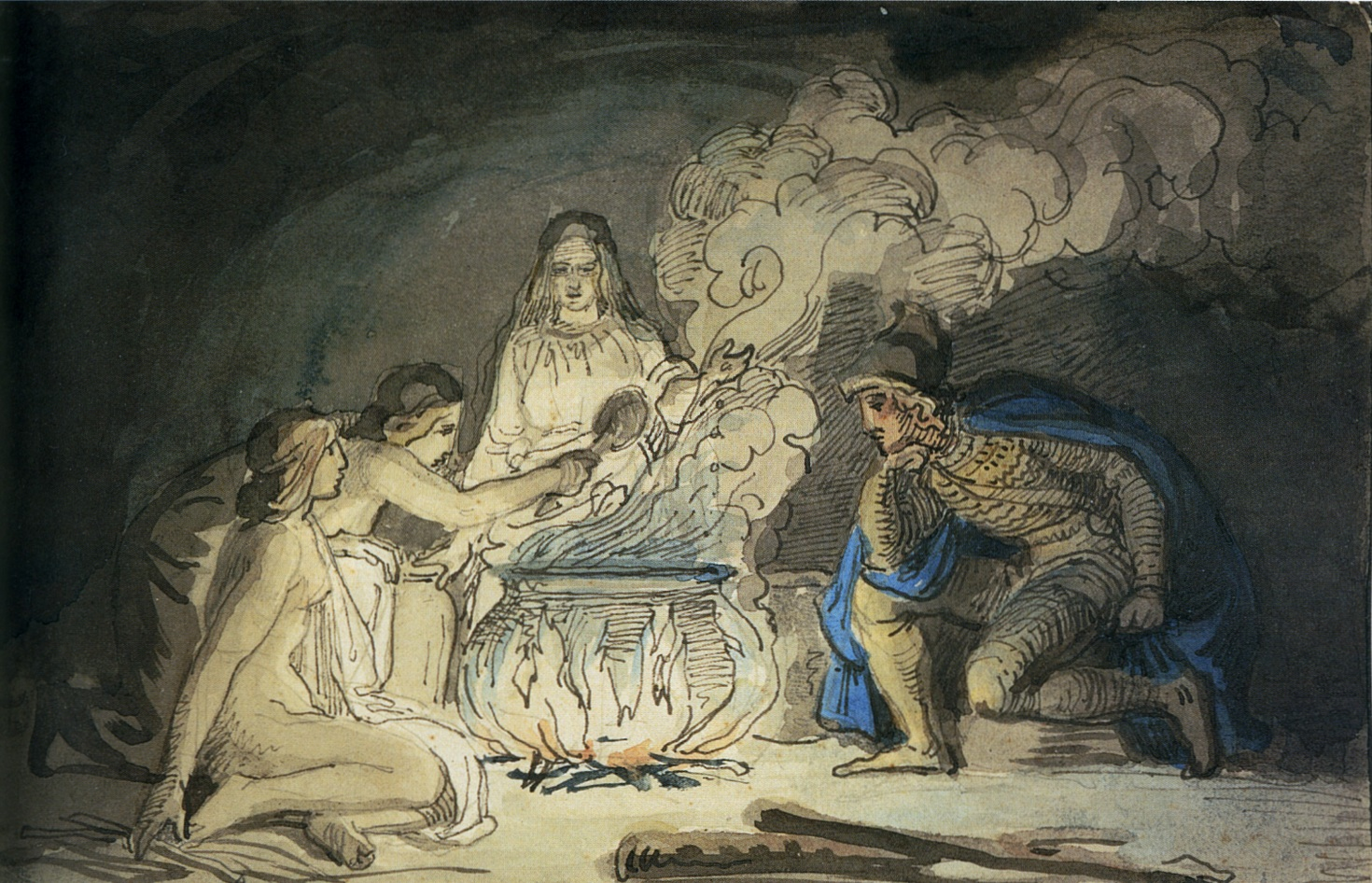
In Saxo's version of the story Hotherus meets wood maidens who warn him that Balderus is a demi-god who can't be killed by normal means.

In Gesta Danorum by Saxo Grammaticus, Hotherus is a human hero of the Danish and Swedish royal lines. He is the son of Hothbrodd (or Hodbrodd) and brother of Athisl, both Kings of Sweden before him. Hotherus himself became ruler of both Sweden and Denmark after the death of the usurper Hiartuar, but most of the story about him as related in Gesta Danorum relates to his early life before becoming king.

Hotherus is gifted in swimming, archery, fighting and music and Nanna, daughter of King Gevarus falls in love with him. But at the same time Balderus, son of Othinus, has caught sight of Nanna bathing and fallen violently in love with her. He resolves to slay Hotherus, his rival. Out hunting, Hotherus is led astray by a mist and meets wood-maidens who control the fortunes of war. They warn him that Balderus has designs on Nanna but also tell him that he shouldn't attack him in battle since he is a demigod. Hotherus goes to consult with King Gevarus and asks him for his daughter. The king replies that he would gladly favour him but that Balderus has already made a like request and he does not want to incur his wrath. Gevarus tells Hotherus that Balderus is invincible but that he knows of one weapon which can defeat him, a sword kept by Mimingus, the satyr of the woods. Mimingus also has another magical artifact, a bracelet that increases the wealth of its owner. Riding through a region of extraordinary cold in a carriage drawn by reindeer, Hotherus captures the satyr with a clever ruse and forces him to yield his artifacts.

Hearing about Hotherus's artifacts, Gelderus, king of Saxony, equips a fleet to attack him. Gevarus warns Hotherus of this and tells him where to meet Gelderus in battle. When the battle is joined, Hotherus and his men save their missiles while defending themselves against those of the enemy with a testudo formation. With his missiles exhausted, Gelderus is forced to sue for peace. He is treated mercifully by Hotherus and becomes his ally. Hotherus then gains another ally with his eloquent oratory by helping King Helgo of Hålogaland win a bride. Meanwhile, Balderus enters the country of King Gevarus armed and sues for Nanna. Gevarus tells him to learn Nanna's own mind. Balderus addresses her with cajoling words but is refused. Nanna tells him that because of the great difference in their nature and stature, since he is a demigod, they are not suitable for marriage.

As news of Balderus's efforts reaches Hotherus, he and his allies resolve to attack Balderus. A great naval battle ensues where the gods fight on the side of Balderus. Thoro in particular shatters all opposition with his mighty club. When the battle seems lost, Hotherus manages to hew Thoro's club off at the haft and the gods are forced to retreat. Gelderus perishes in the battle and Hotherus arranges a funeral pyre of vessels for him. After this battle Hotherus finally marries Nanna. Balderus is not completely defeated and shortly afterwards returns to defeat Hotherus in the field. But Balderus's victory is without fruit for he is still without Nanna. Lovesick, he is harassed by phantoms in Nanna's likeness and his health deteriorates so that he cannot walk but has himself drawn around in a cart.

Hotherus learned of the death of King Rolf Kraki, whose father had slain Hotherus' father Hodbrodd. He took a fleet to Denmark and was appointed king. Shortly afterwards, he also heard of the death of his brother Athisl, and also became king of Sweden.

After a while Hotherus and Balderus have their third battle and again Hotherus is forced to retreat. Weary of life because of his misfortunes, he plans to retire and wanders into the wilderness. In a cave he comes upon the same maidens he had met at the start of his career. Now they tell him that he can defeat Balderus if he gets a taste of some extraordinary food which had been devised to increase the strength of Balderus. Encouraged by this, Hotherus returns from exile and once again meets Balderus in the field. After a day of inconclusive fighting, he goes out during the night to spy on the enemy. He finds where Balderus's magical food is prepared and plays the lyre for the maidens preparing it. While they don't want to give him the food, they bestow on him a belt and a girdle which secure victory. Heading back to his camp, Hotherus meets Balderus and plunges his sword into his side. Despite realising that it was a mortal wound, Balderus insists on being carried back into battle on a litter. After three days, Balderus dies from his wound.

Many years later, Bous, the son of Othinus and Rinda, returns to avenge his brother by killing Hotherus. Hotherus foresees that he will die in the battle and asks the assembly of elders to pass the kingship to his son Rorik, which they do. Hotherus faces Bous in battle and is killed, but Bous also dies the next day from his wounds.

=== Gesta Danorum på danskæ ===
Gesta Danorum på danskæ is an Old Danish work based, in part on Saxo's Gesta Danorum and another Latin chronicle called the Chronicon Lethrense. It contains a second, briefer euhemerized account of Höðr's slaying of Balder, as follows:

Gesta Danorum på danskæ (manuscript B 77)	Gesta Danorum på danskæ (manuscript C 67)	Deeds of the Danes in Danish (Peter Tunstall's translation)
Sithæn warth Høthær konungh, Hodbrodæ ſøn, Hadding konungs døttær ſøn, for thy at han war næftæ arwæ. Han [war konung i Saxæland. Han drap i ſtrith Baldær, Othæns ſøn, oc æltæ Othæn oc Thor oc therræ kompanæ; the hafthæs for [af guthæ, æn tho the thœt æi woræ… Sithaen war han dræpæn af Both, thæns ſøn, i ſtrith.	Sithen war Hothar konung, Hotbrodæ ſøn, Hadings konungs dothers ſøn, forthi han war neſt arffuæ. Han wan konung aff Saxaland [j ſtriidh. Han drap Baldar, Othæns ſøn, j ſtriidh och ælthæ Othen, Thor och therræ companæ, ther haffthes foræ guthæ och tho æy waræ. [Han fik Swerike effther ſin brothers døth. Sithen war han dræpen aff Both, Othens ſøn, j ſtriidh.	Then Hodbrod's son Hother was king, the son of Hadding's daughter, since he was the nearest heir. He was king of Saxland. He killed Othen's son, Balder, in battle, and pursued Othen and Thor and their companions. They were seen as gods, even though they weren't. Later he was killed in battle by Othen's son Both.

After this, Hother's son Rorik Slengeborre, or Rake, became king.

=== Hversu Noregr byggðist ===
Höðr appears in the genealogies of Hversu Noregr byggðist ("How Norway was inhabited"). There, he is the ruler of Haðaland and the father of Höddbroddr (instead of being Höddbroddr's son, as in the Gesta Danorum). Höddbroddr's descendants are described for a further six generations, and include Hromund Gripsson.

Höðr's parentage is not explicitly given in this text, but he may be the same as Haukr, the second legitimate son of Raum the Old by his wife Hilda, daughter of Gudrod the Old. This is because Raum the Old had four sons by Hilda and this statement is followed by four lineages springing from four men, who are otherwise the four sons of Raum and Hilda in the same order except that Höðr takes the place of Haukr.

== Rydberg's theories ==
According to the Swedish mythologist and romantic poet Viktor Rydberg, the story of Baldr's death was taken from Húsdrápa, a poem composed by Ulfr Uggason around 990 AD at a feast thrown by the Icelandic Chief Óláfr Höskuldsson to celebrate the finished construction of his new home, Hjarðarholt, the walls of which were filled with symbolic representations of the Baldr myth among others. Rydberg suggested that Höðr was depicted with eyes closed and Loki guiding his aim to indicate that Loki was the true cause of Baldr's death and Höðr was only his "blind tool." Rydberg theorized that the author of the Gylfaginning then mistook the description of the symbolic artwork in the Húsdrápa as the actual tale of Baldr's death.

== Sources ==
- Bellows, Henry Adams (trans.) (1936). The Poetic Edda. Princeton: Princeton University Press. Available online Archived 1 May 2021 at the Wayback Machine
- Brodeur, Arthur Gilchrist (transl.) (1916). The Prose Edda by Snorri Sturluson. New York: The American-Scandinavian Foundation. Available online in parallel text Archived 18 January 2016 at the Wayback Machine
- Dronke, Ursula (ed. and trans.) (1997) The Poetic Edda: Mythological Poems. Oxford: Oxford University Press. ISBN 0-19-811181-9.
- Eysteinn Björnsson (2001). Lexicon of Kennings: The Domain of Battle. Published online: https://web.archive.org/web/20090328200122/http://www3.hi.is/~eybjorn/ugm/kennings/kennings.html
- Eysteinn Björnsson (ed.). Snorra-Edda: Formáli & Gylfaginning: Textar fjögurra meginhandrita. 2005. Published online: https://web.archive.org/web/20080611212105/http://www.hi.is/~eybjorn/gg/
- Eysteinn Björnsson (ed.). Völuspá. Published online: https://web.archive.org/web/20090413124631/http://www3.hi.is/~eybjorn/ugm/vsp3.html
- Friis-Jensen, Karsten; Fisher, Peter (2015). Gesta Danorum. Vol. 1 (First ed.). Oxford: Oxford University Press. ISBN 9780198205234.
- Guðni Jónsson (ed.) (1949). Eddukvæði : Sæmundar Edda. Reykjavík: Íslendingasagnaútgáfan. Available online
- Lindow, John (2019). "Divine and Human, Living and Dead". Saga-Book. 43: 83–102. ISSN 0305-9219. JSTOR 48617213.
- Lindow, John (2001). Norse Mythology: A Guide to the Gods, Heroes, Rituals, and Beliefs. Oxford University Press. ISBN 978-0-19-983969-8.
- Orchard, Andy (1997). Dictionary of Norse Myth and Legend. Cassell. ISBN 978-0-304-34520-5.
- Orel, Vladimir E. (2003). A Handbook of Germanic Etymology. Brill. ISBN 978-90-04-12875-0. Archived from the original on 20 April 2023.
- Simek, Rudolf (2000) [1993]. Dictionary of Northern Mythology. Translated by Angela Hall. D. S. Brewer. ISBN 0-85991-513-1.
- Thorpe, Benjamin (transl.) (1866). Edda Sæmundar Hinns Froða : The Edda Of Sæmund The Learned. (2 vols.) London: Trübner & Co. Available online Archived 5 April 2023 at the Wayback Machine at Google Books
- de Vries, Jan (1977) [1958 (vol. 5)]. Altnordisches Etymologisches Wörterbuch (2nd improved ed.). Leiden: Brill.

Legendary titles
Preceded by Rolvo Krake	King of Denmark in Gesta Danorum	Succeeded by Rørikus
