= Chronicon Lethrense =

Chronicon Lethrense

Chronicon Lethrense (Danish: Lejrekrøniken English: Chronicle of Lejre/Leire) is a small Danish medieval work from the late 12th century, written in Latin.

== Themes ==
Unlike Chronicon Roskildense, which deals primarily with information presented as real historical facts after the introduction of Christianity in Denmark, Chronicon Lethrense is a recording of folklore about the old pre-Christian Danish kings and the adventure stories that were eventually associated with them. In that sense it is not much different from the first part of Sven Aggesen's Brevis Historia Regum Dacie or Saxo Grammaticus' Gesta Danorum, though considerably smaller and of much lesser quality. It is sometimes referred to as the "Chronicle of the Kings of Lejre."

One of the noted aspects of Chronicon Lethrense is the writer's deep hatred of all things German, which at times takes on epic proportions. This German hatred can also be traced, although to a lesser degree, in Aggesen's Brevis Historia Regum Dacie, and to a much lesser degree in Saxo's Gesta Danorum. The second book of Saxo's Gesta Danorum, starting at Halfdan Scylding, through the fourth book, the reign of Dan II, is based on the genealogy of the Chronicon, though substantial additional mythical material has been used.

The original version of Chronicon Lethrense is certainly a work of its own. Its stories are interesting and over time copies found its way to other places; there was a copy in the 13th-century Latin Annals of the Cathedral of Lund. Because of this, Chronicon Lethrense is often connected to Annales Lundenses, of which it is now a part, but it is unlikely the chronicle was originally included in this anthology.

== History ==
The chronicle is believed to have been composed in the second half of the 12th century, probably around 1170, or according to more recent scholarship, in the early 1190s, and preceded the writing of the far more famous and verbose Gesta Danorum by Saxo, with which it shares many traditions not found in other sources. The Chronicon Lethrense was one of Saxo's many sources.

The Chronicon Lethrense, as included in the Annales Lundenses, supplied material for several other chronicles, such as the conscise Annales Ryenses (around 1290), the Compendium Saxonum (1340s) and the Gesta Danorum på danskæ (round 1300, not to be confused with Saxo's work of the same title).

Swedish translations from the 14th century, suggest that the original might have been more extensive than the texts that have been preserved.

== Authorship ==
Although the author is unknown, there is some conjecture that he may have been a clerk tightly linked to the Roskilde Cathedral. This is based on the great interest the author has in the city of Roskilde, which he describes in vivid detail, chronicling how it got its name and promising immortality to the city through his writing.
