= Helgi the Sharp (Zealand) =

Legendary king of Zealand

Helgi the Sharp (Old Norse: Helgi hvassi) was a legendary king of Zealand in the saga fragment Sögubrot af nokkrum fornkonungum. He was the co-ruler with his brother Hrœrekr.

Helgi visited the court of King Ivar in Sweden to ask for the hand of his daughter Aud. Although Aud was inclined to accept Helgi's offer, Ivar rejected it. Ivar told Helgi that while he (Ivar) was in favour of the match, Aud did not want him. Later, Helgi suggested that his younger brother Hrœrekr should seek Aud's hand, and Helgi returned to King Ivar to ask for her hand on his brother's behalf. Aud would rather not have accepted the offer, as this would have been further insult to Helgi, but Ivar overruled her decision and agreed the match, so Aud returned to Zealand with Helgi and married Hrœrekr. Some time later, once Hrœrekr and Aud's son Harald was born, Ivar visited Zealand and told Hrœrekr that Auðr was unfaithful with Helgi, and that people said Harald was Helgi's son. Hrœrekr then killed Helgi and after this Hrœrekr was himself soon killed by his father-in-law Ivar who had one opponent less and wanted to include Zealand in his dominions.

The family tree of legendary Kings of the Danes, according to Sögubrot af nokkrum fornkonungum

Kings of the Danes are marked with a crown (♕).

Halfdan the Brave ♂
KEY
♕ Ivar Wide-Grip ♂	Alf the Old ♂	Marriage or coupling
Parent and child
♕ Helgi ♂	♕ Hroerek ♂	Aud the Deep-Minded ♀	Radbard, King of Gardariki ♂	Unclear or distant succession
wife of Harald ♀	♕ Harald Wartooth ♂	father of Sigurd Hring ♂	King Alf or Gandalf, of Alfheimar ♂
Hroerek Ring-Slinger ♂	Thrand the Old ♂	♕ Sigurd Hring ♂	Alfhild ♀
Ragnar ♂

The source used for the genealogical information and name spellings is the English translation by Peter Tunstall.
