= Ráðbarðr =

Legendary king of Garðaríki

Ráðbarðr, sometimes Anglicised as Radbard or Rathbarth, was a legendary king of Garðaríki, who appears in Sögubrot af nokkrum fornkonungum and the Lay of Hyndla.

== Attestations ==
=== Sögubrot ===
Sögubrot tells that he married the fugitive princess Auðr the Deep-Minded, the daughter of Ivar Vidfamne, without the consent of her father king Ivar Vidfamne, who soon departed to punish his daughter. He died en route, however, and so Ráðbarðr helped Auð's son Harald Wartooth claim his maternal grandfather's possessions in Sweden and Denmark.

The family tree of legendary Kings of the Danes, according to Sögubrot af nokkrum fornkonungum

Kings of the Danes are marked with a crown (♕).

Halfdan the Brave ♂
KEY
♕ Ivar Wide-Grip ♂	Alf the Old ♂	Marriage or coupling
Parent and child
♕ Helgi ♂	♕ Hroerek ♂	Aud the Deep-Minded ♀	Radbard, King of Gardariki ♂	Unclear or distant succession
wife of Harald ♀	♕ Harald Wartooth ♂	father of Sigurd Hring ♂	King Alf or Gandalf, of Alfheimar ♂
Hroerek Ring-Slinger ♂	Thrand the Old ♂	♕ Sigurd Hring ♂	Alfhild ♀
Ragnar ♂

The source used for the genealogical information and name spellings is the English translation by Peter Tunstall.

=== Lay of Hyndla ===
The twenty-eighth stanza of the Lay of Hyndla describes the family of Harald Wartooth. It says that Ráðbarðr was the father (presumably by Auðr, given the context) of Randver.

=== Gesta Danorum ===
A possibly unrelated character named Rathbarthus is mentioned in the Latin Gesta Danorum by Saxo Grammaticus, in Book 8 during Saxo's version of the Battle of Brávellir, where Harald Wartooth died. He is described as the grandfather of Regnaldus Rutenus (i.e. Regnald the Ruthenian or Russian), who was one of the kings who served in the bodyguard of Olo the Vigorous (who would later be made king of Denmark after the battle).
