= Hrœrekr Ringslinger =

Legendary 7th-century king of Zealand or Denmark

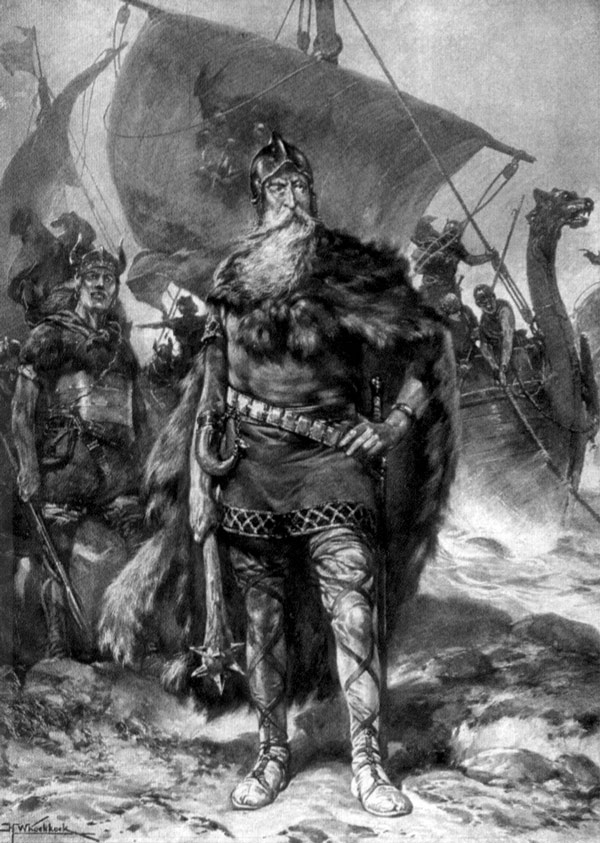
Rorik as conceived by Hermanus Willem Koekkoek, 1912

Hrœrekr Ringslinger or Ringscatterer (Old Norse: Hrærekr slöngvanbaugi, Old Danish: Rørik Slængeborræ or Rørik Slyngebond) was a legendary king of Zealand or Denmark, who appears in Gesta Danorum, Gesta Danorum på danskæ, Sögubrot, Njáls saga, Hversu Noregr byggðist, Skjöldunga saga, Bjarkarímur, and Hrólfs saga kraka. Connection with such historical figures such as Horik I, who ruled Denmark around 854 for a dozen or so years, or the founder of the Rurik dynasty is fraught with difficulty.

The Danish and the West Norse traditions have little more in common than his name, his title, and his living within a few generations of Hrólfr Kraki. In the Danish tradition, he is described as the grandfather of Prince Hamlet.

== Name ==
The name Slængeborræ in Gesta Danorum på danskæ is a corruption of Slænganbøghe, which is the Old East Norse form of Old West Norse slöngvanbaugi meaning "ring slinger", i.e. a king who was generous with his gold. Saxo's version Slyngebond means "bracelet slinger" and the motivation Saxo gives is strikingly different (see below).

== Danish tradition ==
=== Brevis historia regum Dacie ===
In Brevis historia regum Dacie by Sven Aggesen, he is mentioned briefly as Rokil, who has the surname Slagenback. In this version, he is the son of Rolf Kraki and the father of Frothi the Bold.

The family tree of legendary Kings of the Danes, according to Brevis historia regum Dacie by Sven Aggesen

Kings of the Danes are marked with a crown (♕).

♕ Skiold
KEY
Frothi	♕ Halfdan	Marriage or coupling
Parent and child
♕ Helghi	Inheritance by other or unclear means
♕ Rolf Kraki
♕ Rokil Slagenback
♕ Frothi the Bold
♕ Wermund
♕ Uffi
♕ Dan the High-minded, or the Proud
♕ Frothi the Old
♕ Frithlefer
♕ Frothi Frithgothæ, or the Magnificent
♕ Ingiald
♕ Olaf	Regner Lothbrogh
daughter	♕ Sighwarth
♕ Knut (first of that name in Denmark)
♕ Snio
♕ Klak-Harald
♕ Gorm Løghæ	Thyrwi, the Ornament of the Realm
historical kings of Denmark

The source used for the genealogical information and name spellings is the English translation by Eric Christiansen.

=== Gesta Danorum ===
The Gesta Danorum (book 3) by Saxo Grammaticus makes Rørik Slyngebond the son of Höðr (Høther), a mortal king of Sweden and Denmark. When Odin's son Boe had killed Höðr, the Swedes, the Curonians and the Slavs rebelled against Denmark (Saxo patriotically ignores the fact that he had previously given Höðr as a prince of Sweden who ruled Denmark) and attacked Rørik.

When the Slavic and Danish forces met, a Slavic wizard suggested that instead of having a large battle and lose a great many lives, two men should meet in a duel. If the Slav won, the tribute would be cancelled, but if the Dane won, the tribute would be paid as in the old days. A Dane asked Rørik what the reward would be for the Danish champion if he won the fight. Rørik promised a chain of six laced bracelets. The Dane entered the duel but was defeated and died.

The next day, the winning Slavic champion was emboldened by his victory and asked if there was a second Dane who wanted to meet him in combat. A warrior named Ubbe who was both strong and skilled in seiðr asked Rørik what the prize would be if he killed the Slav. Once again Rørik promised the chain of bracelets. The Dane asked Rørik if he would leave the chain of bracelets to a third trustworthy man, so that he could not change his mind when the Danish champion had won. Rørik agreed, but the man who would take the chain was on another ship, and when Rørik threw the chain of bracelets across, he underestimated the distance and so the chain fell into the water, and was lost forever. This gave Rørik the cognomen Slyngebond (sling-bracelets). However, Ubbe decided to take the challenge anyway. In the duel both champions died, but the Slavs were impressed and agreed to continue paying the tribute.

Rørik appointed Horwendil and Feng as the rulers of Jutland. Horwendil spent a great deal of time pillaging and won so much fame that Rørik gave him his daughter Gerutha (Gertrude) who bore him the son Amleth (Hamlet).

When Rørik died, he was succeeded by Wiglek.

The family tree of legendary Kings of the Danes, according to the Gesta Danorum (Books I to VII)

Kings of the Danes are in bold and marked with a crown (♕). Kings of the Swedes are marked with a dagger (†). Superscript numbers before a name indicate in which books of Gesta Danorum the individual is mentioned.

^{(1)} Humble
KEY
^{(1)} Angul	^{(1)} **Dan** ♕	^{(1)} Grytha	Marriage or coupling
Parent and child
The Angles	^{(1)} **Humble** ♕	^{(1)} **Lother** ♕	^{(1)} King of the Saxons	Succession by other or unclear means
^{(1)} Roar
^{(1)} Sigtryg, King of the Swedes†	^{(1)} **Skiold** ♕	^{(1)} Alfhild
^{(1)} daughter of Roar	^{(1)} Bess
^{(1)} sister of Gram	^{(1)} Gróa	^{(1)} **Gram** ♕†	^{(1)} Sumble, King of the Finns
^{(1)} Wagnhofde
^{(1)} Signe	^{(1)} Henry, King of the Saxons	^{(1)} Hakon, King of the Nitherians
^{(1)} Hardgrep
^{(1)} **Swipdag** ♕†, King of Norway	^{(1)} sister of Guthorm	^{(1)} **Guthorm** ♕	^{(1,2,5)} **Hadding** ♕	^{(1)} Ragnhild
^{(1)} Asmund†	^{(1)} Gunnhild	^{(1)} Guthorm
^{(1,2)} Ulfhild	^{(2)} **Ubbe** ♕
^{(1)} Henry	^{(1)} Uffe†	^{(1,2)} Hunding†	^{(2)} Thorhild	^{(2)} Scot
^{(1)} daughter of Uffe	^{(2)} Ragnar†	^{(2)} Swanhwid	^{(2)} sisters of Swanhwid	^{(2)} Handwan
^{(2)} Thorwald
^{(2,5)} **Frode** ♕	^{(2)} daughter of Handwan
^{(2,3)} Hothbrodd†	^{(2)} **Halfdan** ♕	^{(2)} Ro	^{(2)} Skat
^{(2)} Thora
^{(2,3)} **Helge** ♕	^{(2)} **Ro** ♕
^{(2,3)} Athisl†	^{(2)} Urse
^{(2,3)} King Gewar	^{(2,3)} **Rolf** Krage ♕†	^{(2)} Rute	^{(2)} Bjarke	^{(2)} Skulde	^{(2,3)} **Hiartuar** †♕
^{(2,3)} **Hother** †♕	^{(3)} Nanna	^{(3)} Herlek	^{(3)} Gerit
^{(3)} former King of Britain	^{(3)} mother of the King of Britain	^{(3)} a slave	^{(3)} a bondmaid	^{(3)} **Rorik** Slyngebond ♕	^{(3)} Gerwendil
^{(3,4)} King of Britain	^{(3,4)} Queen of Britain	^{(3,4)} Gerutha	^{(3,4)} Horwendil	^{(3,4)} Feng
^{(3,4)} foster sister of Amleth	^{(3,4)} daughter of the King of Britain	^{(3,4)} Amleth	^{(4)} Hermutrude, Queen of Scotland	^{(4)} **Wiglek** ♕
^{(4)} son of Amleth	^{(4)} **Wermund** ♕	^{(4)} Frowin, governor of Sleswik
^{(4)} **Uffe** ♕, aka Olaf the Gentle	^{(4)} daughter of Frowin	^{(4)} Ket	^{(4)} Wig
^{(4)} **Dan** ♕
^{(4)} **Hugleik** ♕
^{(4)} **Frode** the Vigorous ♕
^{(4)} **Dan** ♕
^{(5)} Kraka	^{(5)} Ragnar	^{(5)} Brak	^{(4,5)} **Fridleif** the Swift ♕	^{(5)} Hun, King of the Huns	^{(5)} Hun
^{(5)} Gotar, King of Norway	^{(5)} Westmar	^{(5)} Koll	^{(5)} Gotwar
^{(5)} Roller	^{(5,6)} Erik† Shrewd-spoken	^{(5)} Gunwar the Fair	^{(5)} Alfhild	^{(5,6)} **Frode** ♕	^{(5)} Hanund	^{(5)} Grep (eldest of three)	^{(5)} 11 other sons (two named Grep)
^{(6)} Hythin, King of Tellemark	^{(5)} Alf	^{(5)} Eyfura	^{(5)} Arngrim	^{(6)} Grubb	^{(6)} **Hiarn** ♕	^{(6)} Amund, King of Norway
^{(6)} child of Hythin	^{(6)} Halfdan†	^{(5)} 12 sons, including Anganty	^{(6)} Ane	^{(6)} Juritha	^{(6)} **Fridleif** ♕	^{(6)} Frogertha
^{(6)} Hanef, King of Saxony	^{(6)} Swerting, King of Saxony	^{(6)} Olaf	^{(6)} **Frode** ♕
^{(6,7)} Siward†	^{(6)} sons of Swerting	^{(6)} sister of the sons of Swerting	^{(6,7)} **Ingild** ♕	^{(6)} Helga	^{(6)} Helge	^{(6)} Asa
^{(6,7)} Frode	^{(6,7)} Fridleif	^{(6,7)} Ingild	^{(6,7)} **Olaf** ♕	^{(7)} Karl, governor of Gothland
^{(7)} Ulfhild	^{(7)} **Frode** ♕	^{(7)} Hather, a chief	^{(7)} **Harald** ♕	^{(7)} Signe
^{(7)} Erik†	^{(7)} Thorhild	^{(7)} **Halfdan** Biargramm ♕†	^{(7)} Harald
^{(7)} Asmund
Kings of Norway

Name spellings are derived from Oliver Elton's 1905 translation, The First Nine Books of the Danish History of Saxo Grammaticus, via Wikisource.

=== Gesta Danorum på danskæ ===
The Gesta Danorum på danskæ, an Old Danish work based partly on Saxo and on the earlier Chronicon Lethrense, agrees with the Gesta Danorum by making Rørik the son of an earthly Hother who killed Balder, Odin's son, in battle. Höðr was himself killed by Odin's son Both.

Rørik Slængeborræ was a victorious king who conquered Courland, Wendland and Sweden and made them pay tribute to him. He was also surnamed Rake (the Proud). He appointed Orwendel and Feng as the commanders of Jutland and gave his sister to Orwendel. The sister and Orwendel were the parents of Amblothe (Hamlet). Rørik was succeeded by his son Wighlek.

The family tree of legendary Kings of the Danes, according to Gesta Danorum på danskæ (extract)

Kings of the Danes are marked with a crown (♕).

♕ Halfdan ♂	Ro ♂	Skat ♂	KEY
Marriage or coupling
♕ Ro or Halfdan ♂	♕ Helghe ♂	Thore ♀	Parent and child
Succession by other means
♕ A dog king ♂	Yrse ♀
♕ Snio ♂	♕ Rolf Krage ♂	Skulda ♀	♕ Hartwar ♂
Hodbrod ♂	Hadding's daughter ♀
♕ Hother ♂
♕ Rorik Slengeborre, also called Rake ♂	Rorik's sister ♀	Orwendel ♂	Feng ♂
King of Britain's daughter ♀	Amblothe ♂	Queen of Scotland ♀
♕ Wighlek ♂	Nanna ♀
♕ Wermund ♂
♕ Offe the Strong ♂

The source used for the genealogical information and name spellings is the English translation provided by Peter Tunstall.

== West Norse tradition ==
The Norwegian and Icelandic tradition only mentions Hrœrekr in relation to the Scanian chieftain Ivar Vidfamne who made himself the ruler of both Denmark and Sweden. There is no information on his parentage, nor any Hamlet. In these sources, Hrœrekr is only the king of Zealand, Skåne and Jutland being in the hands of other rulers.

=== Sögubrot ===
Sögubrot relates that when Ivar Vidfamne was the king of Sweden, he gave his daughter Auðr the Deep-Minded to Hrœrekr, even though she wanted to marry Hrœrekr's brother Helgi the Sharp. Hrœrekr and Auðr then had the son Harald Wartooth. Ivar told Hrærekr that Auðr was unfaithful with his brother Helgi. The ruse worked and Hrœrekr killed his brother, after which Ivar attacked and killed Hrœrekr too. However, Auðr arrived with the Zealand army and chased her father Ivar back to Sweden. The following year, Auðr went to Garðaríki with her son Harald and many powerful men and married its king Raðbarðr. This was the opportunity for Ivar to conquer Zealand.

Sögubrot adds a second Hrœrekr slöngvanbaugi who was the son of Harald Wartooth, and consequently named after his grandfather.

The family tree of legendary Kings of the Danes, according to Sögubrot af nokkrum fornkonungum

Kings of the Danes are marked with a crown (♕).

Halfdan the Brave ♂
KEY
♕ Ivar Wide-Grip ♂	Alf the Old ♂	Marriage or coupling
Parent and child
♕ Helgi ♂	♕ Hroerek ♂	Aud the Deep-Minded ♀	Radbard, King of Gardariki ♂	Unclear or distant succession
wife of Harald ♀	♕ Harald Wartooth ♂	father of Sigurd Hring ♂	King Alf or Gandalf, of Alfheimar ♂
Hroerek Ring-Slinger ♂	Thrand the Old ♂	♕ Sigurd Hring ♂	Alfhild ♀
Ragnar ♂

The source used for the genealogical information and name spellings is the English translation by Peter Tunstall.

=== Njals saga ===
Njals saga only mentions Hrœrekr Slöngvanbaugi as an ancestor of a man named Valgarðr. It tells that he was the father of Harald Wartooth, and then it states that Harald's mother was Auðr, the daughter of Ivar Vidfamne, the son of Halfdan the Valiant. It does not mention whether Hrœrekr was married to Auðr, but assumes that the reader is familiar with their story.

=== Hyndluljóð ===
In the poem Hyndluljóð the goddess Freyja meets the völva Hyndla and they ride together towards Valhalla. Freyja rides on her boar Hildisvíni and Hyndla on a wolf. Their mission is to find out the pedigree of Óttarr so that he can touch his inheritance, and the lay consists mostly of Hyndla reciting a number of names from Óttarr's ancestry, among them Hrærekr's in stanza 28.

Haraldr hilditönn borinn Hræreki slöngvanbauga, sonr var hann Auðar, Auðr djúpúðga Ívars dóttir, en Ráðbarðr var Randvers faðir; þeir váru gumnar goðum signaðir; allt er þat ætt þín, Óttarr heimski.	Harald Battle-tooth of Auth was born, Hrörek the Ring-giver her husband was; Auth the Deep-minded was Ivar's daughter, But Rathbarth the father of Randver was: And all are thy kinsmen, Ottar, thou fool!

=== Hversu Noregr byggðist ===
Hversu Noregr byggðist, agrees with Sögubrot by giving Hrœrekr as the father of Harald Wartooth. It also adds that he had the son Randver, the father of the Swedish and Danish king Sigurd Hring. However, other sources disagree with Hversu (Sögubrot and the Lay of Hyndla says that Randver's father was Raðbarðr, whereas Hervarar saga says that it was Valdar).

=== Skjôldunga saga ===
Here, Rørik is the son of Ingjald Frodason (Ingeld), and the half brother of king Halfdan in Lejre, the father of Hroðgar. Ingeld kills Halfdan, and takes his wife as his own. Rørik is the result of this union. The name Slöngvanbaugi is connected to an incident where he threw some rings into the ocean (the ring-slinger).

=== Hrólfs saga kraka ===
In Hrólfs saga kraka, Hrókr is the nephew of Hróarr and Helgi (the son of their elder sister Signý and her husband Sævil jarl). Oscar L. Olson said that "Hrok [from Hrólfs saga] and Hrörik [from Skjöldunga saga] are the same person."

In this version, Hrókr is described as a vicious and greedy man. For the support that Signý and her husband Sævil offered to put Hróarr and Helgi on the throne, Hrókr goes to Helgi and demands either a third of the lands of Denmark or the good ring that was the best of his treasures, not knowing that Helgi had already given the ring to Hróarr in exchange for his renouncing his claim to Denmark. Hrókr then visited Hróarr in Northumbria, where Hróarr was now king, and while they were sailing together he asked for the good ring. When Hróarr wouldn't part with it, Hrókr instead asked merely to see the ring, and when it was placed in his hands he hurled it into the sea so that nobody could enjoy it. In revenge, Hróarr has Hrókr's feet lopped off, but the stumps heal over. Hrókr leads an army against Hróarr and kills him, before taking over the kingship of Northumbria and attempting to seduce Hróarr's widow, Ögn. Ögn put him off until she could give birth to her son by Hróarr, and in this time she sought aid from Helgi in Denmark. Helgi gathered an army and fought Hrókr, taking him captive, then breaking his arms and legs and sending him home to live in agony and ignominy.

The family tree of legendary Kings of the Danes, according to Hrólfs saga kraka

Kings of the Danes are marked with a crown (♕).

Sigríðr ♀	♕ Hálfdan ♂	♕ Fróði ♂	KEY
Marriage or coupling
Sævil jarl ♂	Signý ♀	Norðri, a King in England ♂	Ólöf, Queen of Saxland ♀	Parent and child
Hrókr ♂	Ögn ♀	♕ Hróarr ♂	♕ Helgi ♂	Yrsa ♀	Aðils, King of Sweden ♂	King of the Finns ♂	Ingibjörg ♀
Agnarr ♂	An elf-woman ♀	King Hring ♂	Hvít ♀
Hjörvarðr, a king ♂	♕ Skuld ♀	♕ Hrólfr Kraki ♂	Björn ♂	Bera, a farmer's daughter ♀
♕ Skúr ♀	♕ Drífa ♀	Böðvarr ♂	Elg-Fróði ♂	Þórir Houndsfoot ♂

The source used for the genealogical information is the English translation by Peter Tunstall, and spellings are from the Old Norse edition edited by Guðni Jónsson.

== Notes ==
Legendary titles
Preceded by Høtherus	Kings of Denmark (according to Gesta Danorum)	Succeeded by Wiglek
Unknown	King of Zealand	Succeeded by Ivar Vidfamne
