= Veborg =

Scandinavian shieldmaiden (died 750)

Webiorg, Wigbiorg or Veborg (died 750), was a legendary Scandinavian shieldmaiden who, according to the sagas, participated in the Battle of Bråvalla, which occurred in Sweden in approximately 750. She was of Swedish or Danish origin.

The battle was between King Harald Hildetand of Denmark and Sweden and his Viceroy King Sigurd Hring of Sweden. During this age, Sweden comprised several little kingdoms, but Harald Hildetand had been elected king over most of them. King Sigurd had plans to permanently unite all these kingdoms under one crown, while King Harald wished to keep the possibility of electing different kings to each one. The battle was therefore between unionists and separatists.

It is said that both sides drew mercenaries from Russia, England, Germany and Ireland. Three hundred female soldiers, so-called Shieldmaidens, were on Harald's side. The most famous one, besides Visna and Harald's own daughter, Princess Hed, was Veborg; these three women are described as the generals of the female troops.

Veborg's contribution in the battle is described in detail. One of the strongest warriors of King Harald was Ubbe from Friesland, who defeated three Swedish princes and the fighter Agnar before he was killed by one of the greatest warriors of the unionists, Starke. Veborg then rushed forward to attack Starke. She cut off his jaw, but he managed to escape and cut off the arm of the shieldmaiden Visna, who was holding the separatists' banner. Veborg, described as very brave, then fought the warrior Thorkell the Stubborn in a long and furious struggle, until Thorkell, "after many wounds and much verbal arguing", finally managed to kill her.

Saxo Grammaticus reported that shieldmaidens fought on the side of the Danes at the Battle of Brávellir and that Veborg or Webiorg was among them:

Now out of the town of Sle, under the captains Hetha (Heid) and Wisna, with Hakon Cut-cheek came Tummi the Sailmaker. On these captains, who had the bodies of women, nature bestowed the souls of men. Webiorg was also inspired with the same spirit, and was attended by Bo (Bui) Bramason and Brat the Jute, thirsting for war.

— Saxo Grammaticus
