= Ale the Strong =

Legendary Scandinavian king

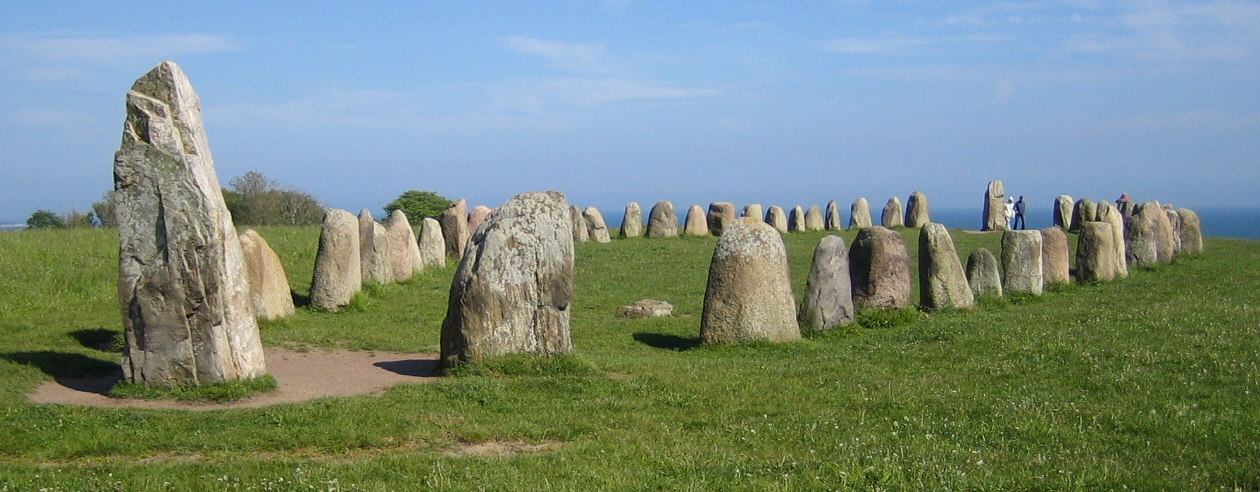
Ale's Stones, where Ale was buried according to tradition.

Ale the Strong (Old Norse: Áli hinn frækni) or Olo the Vigorous (Latin: Olo Vegetus) was a legendary king of Denmark and of Sweden in Scandinavian legend. He appears in the Ynglinga saga section of Snorri Sturluson's Heimskringla and in Books 7 and 8 of Saxo Grammaticus's Gesta Danorum. Although these two version tell very different versions of the story, and place Ale's life in different parts of the history of the kings of Denmark, Ale is killed by Starkad the Old in both versions.

== Attestations ==
=== Heimskringla ===
In Heimskringla, Ale was one of the Skjöldungs (i.e. royal descendants of Skjöld). He was the son of Friðleifr, and the grandson of Fróði the Proud of Denmark. His cousin was Helgi, father of Hrólfr Kraki. (Helgi is, in other versions of the tale, the brother of Hrothgar of Beowulf).

Ale fought several battles against king Aun of Uppsala, and he ruled in Uppsala for 25 years until he was killed by Starkad the old.

=== Gesta Danorum ===
According to Saxo Grammaticus, Olo was the son of Sywardus, a Norwegian, and an unnamed sister of Haraldus Hyldetan (Harald Wartooth). He was reputed to have such a savage countenance that his gaze could scare even the bravest men. His sword was called Løgthi.

In his youth, from the age of fifteen years, he distinguished himself with many adventures, such as:

- He slew Gunno and Grimo of Telemark, who were robbers in Ethascog.
- He single-handedly defeated Scatus and Hiallus and their ten followers, who kidnapped and ravished young maidens; by this, Olo won Esa, daughter of King Olavus of Werms, as his wife.
- He infiltrated the lair of Thoro, who was attacking his country with Tosto the Sacrificer and Liotarus the Monster. By pretending to be an outcast from Sywardus's court, he caused a mock battle among Thoro's retainers and used the chaos to slay Thoro and Liotarus.
- He took command of his father's sea forces, destroying seventy sea-kings in a single battle, including Birvillus, Huirvillus, Thorvillus, Nef, Onef, Redwarthus, Randus and Brandus. After this, he took many young men into his entourage, as well as the ancient champion Starcatherus.

Olo entered the service of first his uncle, Haraldus Hyldetan, king of Denmark, and then his cousin, Ringo, king of Sweden. During the war between Haraldus and Ringo, culminating in the Battle of Brávellir, Olo fought on the side of Ringo and the Swedes. During the battle, Olo had a bodyguard consisting of seven kings (including Holty, Hendil, Holmar, Levy, Hama and Regnaldus the Ruthenian). After Haraldus was killed in the battle, Ringo made Olo the king of Scania and made the shield-maiden Hetha the ruler of Zealand and the rest of the Danish lands.

A group of Zealanders resented being ruled by a woman, so appealed to Olo to invade, promising to revolt in his aid. Olo therefore overthrew Hetha, making her a tributary ruler in Jutland only. However, afterwards, Olo ruled so cruelly and unrighteously that many men who had supported him regretted that they had overthrown Hetha in his favour. Twelve generals (including Lennius, Atylo, Thoccus and Withnus) plotted against his life. They recruited Starkad into the plot, and Starkad resolved to attack Olo in the bath. However, even Starkad was rendered terrified by Olo's countenance, and it was not until Olo had covered his own face (believing his friend Starkad wished to impart a message) that Starkad was able to run him through with a sword. Starkad was rewarded with 120 pounds in gold, but regretted his crime, and avenged Olo's death by killing some of the conspirators.

Olo's son Omundus succeeded him as king of Denmark.

The family tree of legendary Kings of the Danes, according to the Gesta Danorum (Books 1 to 8)

Kings of the Danes are marked with a crown (♕). Kings of the Swedes are marked with a dagger (†). Superscript numbers after a name indicate in which books of Gesta Danorum the individual is mentioned.

Humblus ♂ ^{(1)}
KEY
Angul ♂ ^{(1)}	♕ Dan I ♂ ^{(1)}	Grytha ♀ ^{(1)}	Marriage or coupling
Parent and child
The Angles	♕ Humblus ♂ ^{(1)}	♕ Lotherus ♂ ^{(1)}	King of the Saxons ♂ ^{(1)}	Succession by other or unclear means
Roarus ♂ ^{(1)}
Sigtrugus, King of the Swedes† ♂ ^{(1)}	♕ Skioldus ♂ ^{(1)}	Alvilda ♀ ^{(1)}
daughter of Roarus ♀ ^{(1)}	Bessus ♂ ^{(1)}
sister of Gram ♀ ^{(1)}	Gro ♀ ^{(1)}	♕ Gram† ♂ ^{(1)}	Sumblus, King of the Finns ♂ ^{(1)}
Wagnofthus ♂ ^{(1)}
Signe ♀ ^{(1)}	Henricus, King of the Saxons ♂ ^{(1)}	Haquinus, King of the Nitherians ♂ ^{(1)}
Harthgrepa ♀ ^{(1)}
♕Suibdagerus, King of Norway† ♂ ^{(1)}	sister of Guthormus ♀ ^{(1)}	♕Guthormus ♂ ^{(1)}	♕Hadingus ♂ ^{(1,2,4,5)}	Regnilda ♀ ^{(1)}
Asmundus† ♂ ^{(1)}	Gunnilda ♀ ^{(1)}	Guthormus ♂ ^{(1)}
Ulvilda ♀ ^{(1,2)}	♕ Ubbo ♂ ^{(2)}
Henricus ♂ ^{(1)}	Uffo† ♂ ^{(1)}	Hundingus† ♂ ^{(1,2)}	Thorilda ♀ ^{(2)}	Scottus ♂ ^{(2)}
daughter of Uffo ♀ ^{(1)}	Regnerus† ♂ ^{(2)}	Suanhuita ♀ ^{(2)}	sisters of Suanhuita ♀♀ ^{(2)}	Andwan, King of the Hellespont ♂ ^{(2)}
Thoraldus ♂ ^{(2)}
♕ Frotho I ♂ ^{(2,5)}	daughter of Andwan ♀ ^{(2)}
Hothbrodus† ♂ ^{(2,3)}	♕ Haldanus I ♂ ^{(2)}	Roe ♂ ^{(2)}	Skato ♂ ^{(2)}
Thora ♀ ^{(2)}
♕ Helgo ♂ ^{(2,3)}	♕ Roe ♂ ^{(2)}
Athislus† ♂ ^{(2,3)}	Ursa ♀ ^{(2)}
King Gevarus ♂ ^{(2,3)}	♕ Rolvo Krake† ♂ ^{(2,3)}	Ruta ♀ ^{(2)}	Biarco ♂ ^{(2)}	Sculda ♀ ^{(2)}	♕Hiarwarthus † ♂ ^{(2,3)}
♕ Hotherus† ♂ ^{(2,3)}	Nanna ♀ ^{(3)}	Herlecus ♂ ^{(3)}	Gericus ♂ ^{(3)}
former King of Britain ♂ ^{(3)}	mother of the King of Britain ♀ ^{(3)}	a slave ♂ ^{(3)}	a bondmaid ♀ ^{(3)}	♕ Roricus Slyngebond ♂ ^{(3)}	Gerwendillus ♂ ^{(3)}
King of Britain ♂ ^{(3,4)}	Queen of Britain ♀ ^{(3,4)}	Gerutha ♀ ^{(3,4)}	Horwendillus ♂ ^{(3,4)}	Fengo ♂ ^{(3,4)}
foster sister of Amlethus ♀ ^{(3,4)}	daughter of the King of Britain ♀ ^{(3,4)}	Amlethus ♂ ^{(3,4)}	Herminthruda, Queen of Scotland ♀ ^{(4)}	♕ Wiglecus ♂ ^{(4)}
son of Amlethus ♂ ^{(4)}	♕Wermundus ♂ ^{(4)}	Frowinus, governor of Sleswik ♂ ^{(4)}
♕ Uffo, aka Olavus the Gentle ♂ ^{(4)}	daughter of Frowin ♀ ^{(4)}	Keto ♂ ^{(4)}	Wigo ♂ ^{(4)}
♕ Dan II ♂ ^{(4)}
♕ Huglecus ♂ ^{(4)}
♕ Frotho II, the Vigorous ♂ ^{(4)}
♕ Dan III ♂ ^{(4)}
Craca ♀ ^{(5)}	Regnerus ♂ ^{(5)}	Bracus ♂ ^{(5)}	♕ Fridlevus I, the Swift ♂ ^{(4,5)}	Hun, King of the Huns ♂ ^{(5)}	Hun ♂ ^{(5)}
Gøtarus, King of Norway ♂ ^{(5)}	Westmarus ♂ ^{(5)}	Colo ♂ ^{(5)}	Gøtwara ♀ ^{(5)}
Rollerus ♂ ^{(5)}	Ericus the Shrewd-spoken† ♂ ^{(5,6)}	Gunwara the Fair ♀ ^{(5)}	Alvilda ♀ ^{(5)}	♕ Frotho III ♂ ^{(5,6)}	Hanunda ♀ ^{(5)}	Grep (eldest of three) ♂ ^{(5)}	11 other sons (two named Grep) ♂♂ ^{(5)}
Hythin, King of Tellemark ♂ ^{(6)}	Alvo ♂ ^{(5)}	Ofura ♀ ^{(5)}	Arngrimus ♂ ^{(5)}	Grubbus ♂ ^{(6)}	♕ Hiarnus ♂ ^{(6)}	Amundus, King of Norway ♂ ^{(6)}
child of Hythin ^{(6)}	Haldanus† ♂ ^{(6)}	12 sons, including Angantir ♂♂ ^{(5)}	Ano ♂ ^{(6)}	Iuritha ♀ ^{(6)}	♕ Fridlevus II ♂ ^{(6)}	Frogertha ♀ ^{(6)}
Hanevus, King of Saxony ♂ ^{(6)}	Suertingus, King of Saxony ♂ ^{(6)}	Olavus ♂ ^{(6)}	♕ Frotho IV ♂ ^{(6)}
Sywardus† ♂ ^{(6,7)}	sons of Suertingus ♂♂ ^{(6)}	sister of the sons of Suertingus ♀ ^{(6)}	♕ Ingellus ♂ ^{(6,7)}	Helga ♀ ^{(6)}	Helgo ♂ ^{(6)}	Asa ♀ ^{(6)}
three sons that died in war ♂♂ ^{(7)}	♕ Olavus I ♂ ^{(7)}	Karolus, governor of Gothland ♂ ^{(7)}
Ulvilda ♀ ^{(7)}	♕ Frotho V ♂ ^{(7)}	Hatherus ♂ ^{(7)}	♕ Haraldus I ♂ ^{(7)}	Sygne ♀ ^{(7)}
Ericus† ♂ ^{(7)}	Thorhilda ♀ ^{(7)}	♕ Haldanus II Biargrammus† ♂ ^{(7)}	♕Haraldus II ♂ ^{(7)}
Ebbo ♂ ^{(7)}	mother of Otharus ♀ ^{(7)}	♕ Unguinus, King of the Goths ♂ ^{(7)}	Asmundus ♂ ^{(7)}
sister of Otharus ♀ ^{(7)}	♕ Sywaldus I ♂ ^{(7)}	Sygrutha ♀ ^{(7)}	Kings of Norway
Sywardus, King of the Goths ♂ ^{(7)}	mother of Alvilda ♀ ^{(7)}	Otharus ♂ ^{(7)}	Syritha ♀ ^{(7)}	♕ Sygarus ♂ ^{(7)}	queen of Sygarus ♀ ^{(7)}	Hamundus, a petty king ♂ ^{(7)}
Wemundus ♂ ^{(7)}	Ostenus ♂ ^{(7)}	♕Sywaldus II ♂ ^{(7)}	Algerus ♂ ^{(7)}	Helwin ♂ ^{(7)}	Hamundus ♂ ^{(7)}
Regnaldus, King of the Northmen ♂ ^{(7)}	Alvilda ♀ ^{(7)}	Alf ♂ ^{(7)}	Sygne ♂ ^{(7)}	Hagbarthus ♂ ^{(7)}	Hako ♂ ^{(7)}
Gro ♀ ^{(7)}	Borcarus ♂ ^{(7)}	Drota ♀ ^{(7)}	Gunnarus ♂ ^{(7)}	Hano, ruler of Funen ♂ ^{(7)}	Ostmarus, ruler of Scania ♂ ^{(7)}	Hundingus, ruler of Zealand ♂ ^{(7)}	Roricus, co-ruler of Jutland ♂ ^{(7)}	Hatherus, co-ruler of Jutland ♂ ^{(7)}
Haraldus ♂ ^{(7)}	Hildigerus ♂ ^{(7)}	Røtho, a Ruthenian pirate ♂ ^{(7)}	Wesetus ♂ ^{(7)}
♕Haldanus III ♂ ^{(7)}	Guritha ♀ ^{(7)}
Alverus† ♂ ^{(7,8)}	♕ Haraldus III Hyldetan ♂ ^{(7)}
Olavus ♂ ^{(7)}	Ingo ♂ ^{(7)}	Ingeldus† ♂ ^{(7)}	sister of Haraldus ♀ ^{(7)}	Ubbo ♂ ^{(7)}	sister of Haraldus ♀ ^{(7)}	Sywardus ♂ ^{(7)}	sister of Haraldus ♀ ^{(7)}	Olavus, king of the Werms ♂ ^{(7)}
♕ Ringo† ♂ ^{(7,8)}	♕ Hetha ♀ ^{(8)}	♕ Olo the Vigorous ♂ ^{(7,8)}	Esa ♀ ^{(7)}	son of the king ♂ ^{(7,8)}
Atylo the Scanian ♂ ^{(8)}	Ringo, ruler of Norway ♂ ^{(8)}
Tola ♂ ^{(8)}	Omothus, or Homothus ♂ ^{(8)}	daughter of Ringo ♀ ^{(8)}	Esa ♀ ^{(8)}	♕ Omundus ♂ ^{(7,8)}
Sibbo ♂ ^{(8)}	sister of Gøtarus ♀ ^{(8)}	Gøtarus† ♂ ^{(8)}	daughter of Omundus ♀ ^{(8)}	♕ Sywardus I ♂ ^{(8)}	♕ Buthlus ♂ ^{(8)}	daughter of Omundus ♀ ^{(8)}
Ebbo ♂ ^{(8)}
early wife of Iarmericus ♀ ^{(8)}	♕Iarmericus † ♂ ^{(8)}	Suanilda ♀ ^{(8)}	the Hellepontines, 4 brothers ♂♂ ^{(8)}	Iarmericus' sister, sold to Norwegians ♀ ^{(8)}	Iarmericus' sister, sold to Germans ♀ ^{(8)}
♕ Broderus ♂ ^{(8)}	nephews of Iarmericus ♂♂ ^{(8)}
King of the Goths ♂ ^{(8)}	♕ Sywaldus III ♂ ^{(8)}
King of Sweden† ♂ ^{(8)}	daughter of the King of the Goths ♀ ^{(8)}	♕ Snio ♂ ^{(8)}
♕ Biorn ♂ ^{(8)}
♕ Haraldus III ♂ ^{(8)}
a wife from Sweden ♀ ^{(8)}	♕ Gormo I ♂ ^{(8)}
♕ Gotricus, or Godefridus ♂ ^{(8,9)}

Genealogical information is derived from Oliver Elton's 1905 translation, The First Nine Books of the Danish History of Saxo Grammaticus (via Wikisource). Name spellings are from the 1931 Latin critical edition by Olrik and Ræder (via Wikisource). Regnal numbers, which do not appear in the original text, are included for clarity and taken from the engraving Veræ effigies regum omnium by Erico Olai Tormio.

=== Codex Runicus ===
In the Runekrønike section of the Codex Runicus, which follows the Gesta Danorum version, Ale appears as ᚮᛚᛚᛅ (Olle). It is said that he was so cruel to look upon that he made Starkad fall to his knees. He was succeeded by his son ᛅᛘᚢᚿᛑᛅᚱ (Emundær).

The family tree of legendary Kings of the Danes, according to the Runekrønike section of Codex Runicus

Kings are marked with a crown (♕).

♕ Hading ᚼᛆᛑᛁᚿᚵ
KEY
♕ Froþe ᚠᚱᚮᚦᛅ	Marriage or coupling
Parent and child
♕ Haldan ᚼᛆᛚᛑᛆᚿ	♕ Ro ᚱᚮ	♕ Hælhæ ᚼᛅᛚᚼᛅ	Succession by other or unclear means
♕ Rolf Krakæ ᚱᚮᛚᚠ:ᚴᚱᛆᚴᛅ	Þouhma ᚦᚮᚢᚼᛘᛆ
♕ Høþær ᚼᚯᚦᛅᚱ; King in Sweden	♕ Baldær ᛒᛆᛚᛑᛅᚱ; King in Zealand
♕ Roþrik ᚱᚮᚦᚱᛁᚴ	♕ Ambluþe ᛆᛘᛒᛚᚢᚦᛅ; King in Jutland	Uiþlek ᚢᛁᚦᛚᛅᚴ
♕ Uærmund ᚢᛅᚱᛘᚢᚿᛑ
♕ Uffi Starke (Strong) ᚢᚠᚠᛁ:ᛋᛐᛆᚱᚴᛅ
♕ Dan ᛑᛆᚿ	♕ Huhlek ᚼᚢᚼᛚᛅᚴ
♕ Froþe ᚠᚱᚮᚦᛅ
♕ Dan Dahfulli ᛑᛆᚿ:ᛑᛆᚼᚠᚢᛛᛚᛁ
♕ Friþlef ᚠᚱᛁᚦᛚᛅᚠ
♕ Froþe Friþgoþe ᚠᚱᚮᚦᛅ:ᚠᚱᛁᚦᚵᚮᚦᛅ
♕ Friþlef ᚠᚱᛁᚦᛚᛅᚠ
♕ Froþe ᚠᚱᚮᚦᛅ
♕ Inggiæld ᛁᚿᚵᚵᛁᛅᛚᛑ	Olaf ᚮᛚᛆᚠ
♕ Froþe ᚠᚱᚮᚦᛅ
♕ Haldan ᚼᛆᛚᛑᛆᚿ
sister of Siuald	♕ Siuald ᛋᛁᚢᛆᛚᛑ
♕ Guþriþ ᚵᚢᚦᚱᛁᚦ
♕ A dog king
♕ Haldan ᚼᛆᛚᛑᛆᚿ
♕ Harald Hilditan (Wartooth) ᚼᛆᚱᛆᛚᛑ:ᚼᛁᛚᛑᛁᛐᛆᚿ
♕ Olle ᚮᛚᛚᛅ
♕ Emundær ᛅᛘᚢᚿᛑᛅᚱ
♕ Sihar ᛋᛁᚼᛆᚱ	♕ Buþæl ᛒᚢᚦᛅᛛ
♕ Larmund ᛚᛆᚱᛘᚢᚿᛑ
♕ Snio ᛋᚿᛁᚮ
♕ Gøtrik ᚵᚯᛐᚱᛁᚴ
♕ Ræhinar Loþbroke ᚱᛅᚼᛁᚿᛆᚱ:ᛚᚮᚦᛒᚱᚮᚴᛅ
♕ Erek ᛅᚱᛅᚴ
♕ Lota Knut ᛚᚮᛐᛆ:ᚴᚿᚢᛐ
♕ Froþe ᚠᚱᚮᚦᛅ
♕ Gorm Ænske (the English) ᚵᚮᚱᛘ:ᛅᚿᛋᚴᛅ
♕ Gorm Gamble (the Old) ᚵᚮᚱᛘ:ᚵᛆᛘᛒᛚᛅ	Þyri ᚦᛦᚱᛁ

Name spellings are derived from the edited version of the text into Latin letters by S.S. Boeck (2015) and runes are from the digitised manuscript Am 28 8vo at the University of Copenhagen.

Legendary titles
Preceded by Haraldus Hyldetan	Legendary king of Denmark, according to Gesta Danorum and Codex Runicus	Succeeded by Omundus
Preceded by Aun	Legendary king of Sweden, according to Heimskringla	Succeeded by Aun
