= Auðr the Deep-Minded (Ívarsdóttir) =

Legendary Norse princess

Auðr the Deep-Minded (Old Norse: Auðr in djúpúðga) was a legendary Norse princess, the daughter of Ivar Vidfamne, and the mother of Harald Wartooth and Randver. She appears in Sögubrot, Hversu Noregr byggdist and in the Lay of Hyndla. As Alfhild, she appears in Hervarar saga ok Heiðreks. She would have lived during the 7th or 8th century.

== Sögubrot ==
She was given in marriage to Hrœrekr slöngvanbaugi, the king of Zealand, but she would rather have had his brother Helgi the Sharp. Ivar Vidfamne took advantage of the situation by telling Hrœrekr that Auðr was unfaithful with Helgi. The ruse was successful and Hrærekr slew his brother Helgi, after which it was easy for Ivar to attack Hrœrekr and to kill him as well.

Auðr fled to Garðaríki with her son Harald Wartooth, and married its king, Ráðbarðr, with whom she later had a son named Randver. Her father, King Ivar, was upset that his daughter had married without his consent. Although he was old, he departed to Garðaríki with a large leidang. One night, as they were harboured in the Gulf of Finland, he had a strange dream, and he asked his foster-father Hörð what it meant. Hörð told Ivar that the dream foretold the death of Ivar and the end of his evil deeds. Ivar and Hörð were standing on a high cliff at the time, and Hörð's words made Ivar so that he threw himself into the sea, whereupon Hörð did the same thing.

As the throne of Sweden and Denmark was vacant, Auðr's son Harald Wartooth departed to Scania to claim his inheritance, with the help of his stepfather Ráðbarðr.

== Hervarar saga ok Heiðreks ==
In Hervarar saga ok Heiðreks, the daughter of Ivar Vidfamne is called Alfhild instead of Auðr. Ivar marries her to Valdar, a sub-king ruling Denmark, and Valdar and Alfhild become the parents of both Randver and Harald Wartooth.
