= Ivar Vidfamne =

Legendary King of Sweden

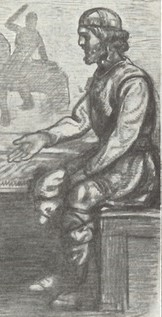
- Ivar Vidfamne in illustration from 1915
- Born: Scania
- Died: 700 CE
- Known for: Semi-legendary Danish king

Ivar Vidfamne (or Ívarr inn víðfaðmi; English exonym Ivar Widefathom; Danish Ivar Vidfadme – in Norwegian and Danish the form Ivar Vidfavne is sometimes used as an alternative form) was a semi-legendary king of Denmark, mentioned exclusively in surviving sources from Iceland. According to these sources, Ivar originated in Scania (in present day Sweden but then part of Denmark). He apparently died circa 700 CE, in Karelia, at a place called Karjálabotnar (Finnish Karjalanpohja), which may have been the modern Kurkiyoki, Karelia (Russian: Куркиёки; Finnish: Kurkijoki; Swedish: Kronoborg), in Lakhdenpokhsky District (Finnish: Lahdenpohja) of Russia.

12th and 13th century sources like Heimskringla and Hervarar saga, attributed to Ivar Vidfamne kingship of a wider empire that included parts of Norway, Saxony and England. However, no such figure is mentioned in medieval Saxon or English sources regarding the 7th, 8th and 9th centuries, if not the major Saxon warlord, enemy of the soon to become French emperor of the Romans Charlemagne, King Widukind. The eponomymous ancestor of the Irish royal clan Uí Ímair is a closely related descendant of Ivar Vidfamne.

== Ivar in the sagas ==
The Ynglinga saga and Sögubrot make clear that his homeland was Scania. The sagas say that the Danish lands were divided into two kingdoms at the time, namely Scania and Zealand. Scania was ruled by a set of brothers, Guðröðr and Halfdan the Valiant, sons of a Gothic princess called Hervor (or Hild). Hervor's husband was Harald the Old, son of Valdar, son of Roar (Hroðgar) of the house of Skjöldung (Scylding). While Guðröðr married Åsa, daughter of the Swedish king Ingjald Illruler, Halfdan's queen was Moald Digra, an aunt of the Anglo-Saxon aristocrat Kinrik (Cynric). According to Hversu Noregr byggðist and Njáls saga he had a son Ivar, and the same paternity is stated in Ynglinga saga and Hervarar saga.

However, Queen Åsa was not content with the state of things, and therefore incited Guðröðr to kill his brother. Later, she murdered her own husband. The Ynglinga saga implies that Ivar had to flee Scania after the murder of his father. After the demise of Guðröðr, he however returned home, while Åsa had to flee to her father in Sweden. Ivar hastily gathered an army and approached Sweden to exact revenge on the murderous queen. King Ingjald was at a feast in Raening with his daughter when he heard that Ivar's army was in the neighbourhood. Ingjald and Åsa then committed suicide by burning themselves and their drunk retainers in the feast hall. The Ynglinga saga, Hervarar saga and Af Upplendinga konungum tell that Ivar conquered Svearike after Ingjald's suicide, and later returned to take Denmark. Apart from the Danish lands, he conquered "a great deal of Saxland, all the East Country (Austrríki), and a fifth part of England". Historia Norwegiæ says that Injald's suicide was incited by fear of Ivar, but does not say that Ivar thereafter conquered Ingjald's lands, and the narrative passes immediately to Ingjald's son Olof Trätälja.

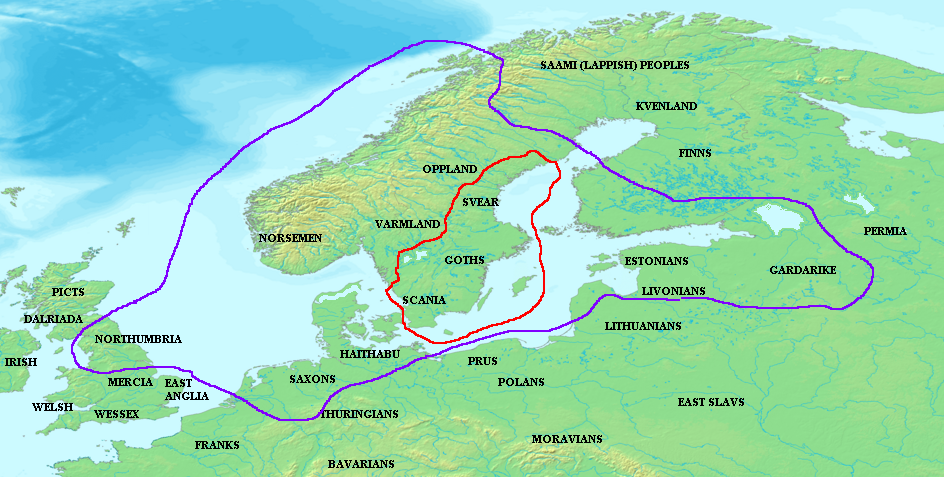
Map showing an interpretation of the attributed extent of Ivar Vidfamne's realms. The kingdom of Ivar Vidfamne (outlined in red) and other territories paying him tribute (outlined in purple), as it may be interpreted from the stories about Ivar Vidfamne in the sagas.

In that way Ivar conquered much of Scandinavia and parts of north Germany and England (sometimes specified as Northumbria), earning the cognomen Vidfamne (Wide-fathoming). Because of his harsh rule, many Swedes fled west and populated Värmland under its king Olof Trätälja. According to Hversu, Njal's saga, the Lay of Hyndla and Sögubrot, Ivar had a daughter named Auðr the Deep-Minded. Sögubrot depicts Ivar in the first place as king of Sweden. It relates that he gave Auðr in marriage to king Hrœrekr Ringslinger of Zealand, in spite of the fact that she wanted to marry Hrœrek's brother Helgi the Sharp. Hrœrekr and Auðr had the son Harald Wartooth. Through cunning intrigues, Ivar made Hrœrekr kill his brother Helgi, and after this, he attacked and killed Hrœrekr. However, Auðr arrived with the Zealand army and chased her father Ivar back to Sweden. The following year, Auðr went to Garðaríki with her son Harald and many powerful men and married its king Ráðbarðr, with Harald's consent but not Ivar's. This was the opportunity for Ivar to conquer Zealand.

When Ivar learnt that Auðr had married without his permission, he marshaled a great leidang from Denmark and Sweden and led the fleet to Gardariki to attack Ráðbarðr. He was very old at the time. However, when they had arrived at the borders of Raðbarð's kingdom, Karelia (Karjálabotnar), he had a strange dream and asked his foster father Hord to interpret it. A discussion ensued that ended in Hord likening the megalomaniac Ivar to the Midgard Serpent. The furious Ivar threw himself overboard in order to get at Hord, who was standing at the shore, and was never seen again. Hord also disappeared in the waves, and it is implied that he was no else than Odin in disguise. After Ivar's demise the chiefs of his fleet convened and agreed that they had no feud with Ráðbarðr, and sailed back to their own lands. Harald Wartooth then returned to Zealand and Scania to assume power over the Danish lands. He subsequently conquered back the territories held by his illustrious grandfather.

The Hervarar saga does not mention any daughter named Auðr. Instead it mentions an Alfhild in the same genealogical position. Ivar gave her to Valdar whom Ivar made subking of Denmark, and she gave birth to Harald Wartooth and Randver, father of Sigurd Ring. In the Lay of Hyndla, dated to the 12th century, Ivar, Auðr, Hrœrekr and Harald appear. Raðbarðr also appears, but there is no information about his relationship with them. Strangely, the comprehensive Danish chronicle of Saxo Grammaticus does not mention Ivar Vidfamne, and rather makes Harald Wartooth the son of a Halfdan, himself the son of a Scanian chief called Borkar.

== Interpretations ==
The archaeologist Birger Nerman (1925) argued for the historicity of Ivar and a comprehensive but loosely structured Baltic realm in the late 7th century. This idea has not been pursued by later archaeologists and historians who regard his historical existence as uncertain. The story of Guðröðr being murdered by his queen Åsa seems to replicate another story in the Ynglinga saga, about the Vestfold king Gudrød the Hunter who met a similar fate at the hands of his queen Åsa Haraldsdottir of Agder.

According to some sagas, Ivar Vidfamne was the great-great-great-grandfather of the historical 9th century Viking leader Ivar the Boneless. Reflecting on this purported lineage, historian Kirsten Møller has hypothesised that Ivar Vidfamne may have been a completely fictitious figure, created around the time of Ivar the Boneless. That is, the dissemination of a figure such as Ivar Vidfamne, ruling over a vast empire more than a century earlier, would serve to justify the dynastic and territorial ambitions of Ivar the Boneless and his family.

Legendary titles
Preceded by Ingjald	Legendary king of Sweden	Succeeded by Harald Wartooth
Preceded by Hrœrekr Ringslinger	Legendary king of Zealand	Succeeded by Harald Wartooth
Preceded by Guðröðr of Scania	Legendary king of Scania	Succeeded by Harald Wartooth
