= Álfheimr (region) =

Minor kingdom in ancient Norway

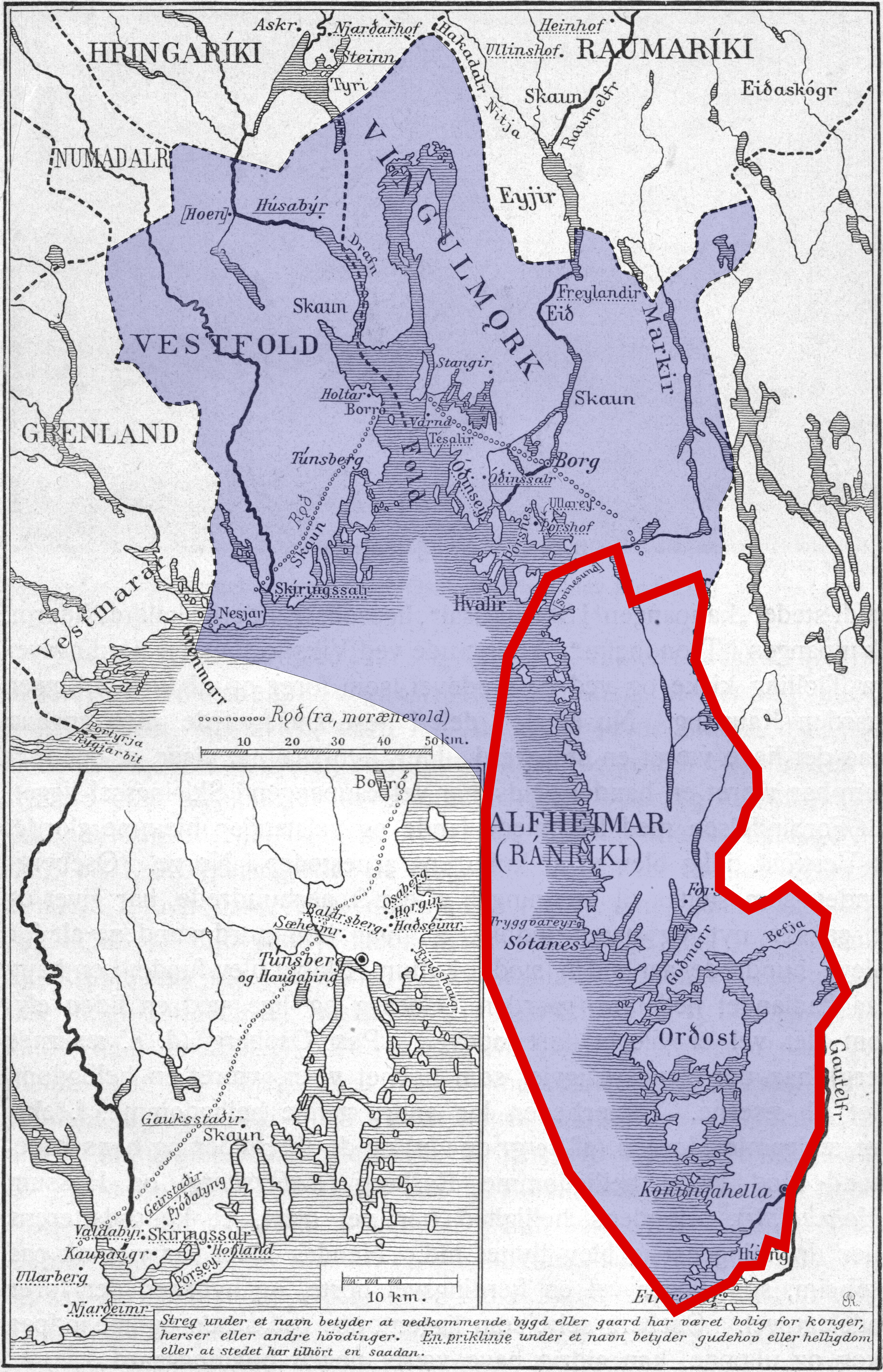
Map of Alfheim in the Middle Ages (in red)

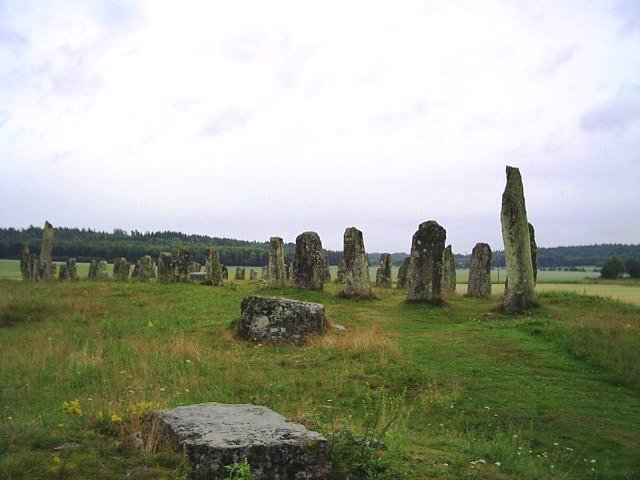
Álfheimr was both the name of the supernatural world of the elves and the name of a kingdom whose legendary kings were related to the elves. This is a stone ship in the former kingdom.

Alfheim (Old Norse: Álfheimr, "elf home" or "land between the rivers") is an ancient name for an area corresponding to the modern Swedish province of Bohuslän.

== About the region and its folk ==
The Ynglinga saga, when relating the events of the reign of King Gudröd (Guðröðr) the Hunter relates:

Álfheim, at that time, was the name of the land between the Raumelfr ['Raum river', lower parts of the modern Glomma river] and the Gautelfr ['Gaut river', the modern Göta älv].

The words "at that time" indicates the name for the region was archaic or obsolete by the 13th century. The element elfr is a common word for 'river' and appears in other river names. It is cognate with Middle Low German elve 'river' and the name of the river Elbe. The Raum Elf marked the border of the region of Raumaríki and the Gaut Elf marked the border of Gautland (modern Götaland). It corresponds closely to the former Norwegian province of Bohuslän, now in Sweden.

The name Álfheim here may have nothing to do with Álfar 'Elves', but may derive from a word meaning 'gravel layer'.

However, the Saga of Thorstein, Viking's Son claims that the two rivers and the country was named from King Álf the Old (Álfr hinn gamli) who once ruled there, and that his descendants were all related to the Elves and were more handsome than any other people except for the giants, one of several references to giants (jǫtnar and risar) being especially good looking. The Sögubrot af nokkrum fornkonungum also mentions the special good looks of the kindred of King Álf the Old.

== Traditions of Álf the Old ==
According to The Saga of Thorstein, Viking's Son, King Álf the Old was married to Bryngerd (Bryngerðr) the daughter of King Raum of Raumaríki.

But according to the Hversu Noregr byggðist, Álf, also called Finnálf, was a son of King Raum who inherited from his father the land from the Gaut Elf river (the modern Göta älv river) north to the Raum Elf river (the modern Glomma river), and that the land was then called Álfheim.

Finnálf married Svanhild (Svanhildr) who was called Gold-feather (Gullfjǫðr) and was the daughter of Day (Dagr) son of Dayspring (Dellingr) by Sun (Sól) daughter of Mundilfari. Dag as a personification of day and the sun-goddess Sól are mentioned elsewhere, but only the Hversu mentions their daughter. Svandhild bore Finnálf a son named Svan the Red (Svanr inn rauði) who was father of Sæfari, father of Úlf (Úlfr), father of Álf, father of Ingimund (Ingimundr) and Eystein (Eysteinn).

According to the eddic poem Hyndluljóð (stanza 12), Óttar, whose genealogy is the subject of this poem, was son of Innstein (Innsteinn), son of Álf the Old, son of Úlf, son of Sæfari, son of Svan the Red. So the Innstein of the Hyndluljód and Eystein of the Hversu are presumably identical.

== Later kings of Álfheimr ==
=== Stuff of Legend ===
Later kings are mentioned in some sagas.

According to Saxo Grammaticus' Gesta Danorum (Book 8), the sons of King Gandálf the Old joined King Harald for the battle of Bråvalla. The Sögubrot names the sons of Gandálf as Álfar (Álfarr) and Álfarin (Álfarinn) and makes them members of King Harald's bodyguard. Presumably they died in the battle. But the kingdom of this Gandálf is not identified in these texts.

The Sögubrot also relates that Sigurd Hring (Sigurðr Hringr), who was Harald's viceroy on the Swedish throne, married Álfhild, the daughter of King Álf the Old of Álfheim. But in a later passage she appears as a descendant of King Álf. The Hversu Noregr byggdist provides instead a lineage of King Álf the Old of Álfheim who was father of Álfgeir the father of Gandálf the father of Álfhild the mother of the famous Ragnar Lodbrok (by Sigurd Hring). That Álfhild's father was the same Gandálf whose sons were at the Battle of Bravalla makes good sense in legendary chronology. But this genealogy may have resulted from misidentification of Gandálf the Old of the battle of Bråvalla with Gandálf son of Álfgeir of the Ynglinga saga who is discussed below. Or if the two Gandálfs may be rightly identified then the chronology is badly garbled.

In all these accounts, the son of Hring and Álfhild was supposedly the famous Ragnar Lodbrok, husband of Áslaug (Áslaugr) the mother of Sigurd Hart (Sigurðr Hjǫrt) whose daughter Ragnhild (Ragnhildr) married Halfdan the Black and bore to him Harald Fairhair, the first historic king of all Norway.

Illuga saga Gríðarfóstra relates of a king Áli of Alfheim and his queen Alfrun. When the queen died, the king married a beautiful but evil woman named Grimhild. She murdered him and tyrannized Alfheim until it was laid waste. His daughter Signy would marry king Hringr of Denmark.

=== On the borders of history ===
The Ynglinga saga, Saga of Halfdan the Black, and Saga of Harald Fairhair, all included in the Heimskringla, tell of kings of Álfheim at the end of the legendary period:

- Álf: His daughter Álfhild (Álfhildr) married King Gudröd the Hunter of Raumaríki and Westfold who brought with her half of the territory of Vingulmork as her dowry. She bore to Gudröd a son named Óláf (Óláfr) who was afterwards named Geirstada-Álf (Geirstaða-Álfr) and was the elder half-brother of Halfdan the Black.
- Álfgeir: He was son of Álf. He regained Vingulmork and placed his son Gandálf (Gandálfr) over it as king.
- Gandálf: He was son of Álfgeir. Since this Gandálf was an older contemporary of Harald Fairhair and since the historical Viking leaders identified as sons of Ragnar Lodbrok in some traditions were also contemporaries of Harald Fairhair, it is not impossible that Álfhild, the supposed mother of Ragnar Lodbrok, was the daughter of this Gandálf as the Hversu Noregr byggdist states. What is told in the Heimskringla is that after many indecisive battles between Gandálf and Halfdan the Black, Vingulmork was divided between them, Halfdan regaining the portion which had been the dowry of his grandfather's first wife Álfhild. Two sons of Gandálf named Hýsing (Hýsingr) and Helsing (Helsingr) later led a force against Halfdan but fell in battle and a third son named Haki fled into Álfheim. When Halfdan's son Harald Fairhair succeeded his father, Gandálf and his son Haki were both part of an alliance of kings who attacked Harald. Haki was slain but Gandálf escaped. There was further war between Gandálf and Harald. At last Gandálf fell in battle and Harald seized all of Gandálf's land up to the Raum Elf river, at that time not taking Álfheim itself.

But later parts of his saga show Harald in full control of the land west of the Gaut Elf river showing that Álfheim did soon become part of his kingdom. From that point it ceased to be an independent region. The Saga of Harald Fairhair relates that it was first conquered by the Swedish king Eirik Eymundsson (Erik Anundsson) who lost it to Harald Fairhair.
