= Sögubrot af nokkrum fornkonungum =

Icelandic text

Sögubrot af nokkrum fornkonungum í Dana- ok Svíaveldi ("Fragment of a Saga about Certain Ancient Kings in the Commonwealth of the Danes and Swedes", often abbreviated to Sögubrot or Sögubrot af fornkonungum) is a fragmentary Old Icelandic text dealing with some legendary Swedish and Danish kings. It is thought to be a part of a younger redaction of the lost Skjöldunga saga. While the older Skjöldunga saga is believed to have been written at the end of the twelfth century, the younger redaction preserved partly in Sögubrot is believed to have been written around 1250 by Óláfr Þórðarson (a.k.a. Olaf Whiteskald). The older Skjöldunga saga is believed to have been concise and objective, and is therefore considered part of the genre of Kings' sagas, whereas the younger redaction from Sögubrot was lengthier and more entertaining, and is therefore considered a legendary saga.

== Manuscript ==
Sögubrot survives in a single manuscript, called AM 1 e β I fol., which dates from around 1300. The manuscript consists of six trimmed and damaged leaves from a larger codex, which originally would have included the rest of the younger redaction as well as the Knýtlinga saga (manuscript AM 20 b I fol., which features a fragment of the Knýtlinga saga, was from the same codex). Two leaves from the middle of the fragment are missing, leading to a lacuna in the story during the reign of Harald Wartooth. The headings are rubricated.

== Content ==
The fragment begins in the middle of the story of Ívarr víðfaðmi, a king of Sweden who wins the realm of Zealand through trickery by playing the co-rulers of Zealand, Helgi and Hrærekr, against each other. Ívarr then commits suicide under strange circumstances while on an invasion of the realm of Ráðbarðr, who had married his daughter Auðr the Deep-Minded without his permission. The fragment then recounts the early life of Harald Wartooth but breaks off; it resumes with the arrival of Sigurd Hring, Harald's old age, and the colossal Battle of Brávellir. It breaks off again towards the end of Sigurd's life.

The family tree of legendary Kings of the Danes, according to Sögubrot af nokkrum fornkonungum

Kings of the Danes are marked with a crown (♕).

Halfdan the Brave ♂
KEY
♕ Ivar Wide-Grip ♂	Alf the Old ♂	Marriage or coupling
Parent and child
♕ Helgi ♂	♕ Hroerek ♂	Aud the Deep-Minded ♀	Radbard, King of Gardariki ♂	Unclear or distant succession
wife of Harald ♀	♕ Harald Wartooth ♂	father of Sigurd Hring ♂	King Alf or Gandalf, of Alfheimar ♂
Hroerek Ring-Slinger ♂	Thrand the Old ♂	♕ Sigurd Hring ♂	Alfhild ♀
Ragnar ♂

The source used for the genealogical information and name spellings is the English translation by Peter Tunstall.
