= Göngu-Hrólfs saga =

Icelandic legendary saga

Göngu-Hrólfs saga is a legendary saga, written mainly for entertainment, as the author clearly states in his preface and at the end of the story. Although the hero shares a name with the settler of Normandy, he has no connection with Rollo, being an earlier and wholly legendary individual.

== Summary ==
The saga begins in Russia, where King Eirik, a Viking leader whose allies include berserks and wizards, attacks Hreggvid, who reigns in 'Holmgarðaríki, which some people call Garðaríki." (Note: 'Several other stories of the components of Garðaríki, or narratives where the name Garðaríki was used interchangeably with Holmgarðaríki, these terms indicating presumably the same area, probably relied on old oral tradition. In the beginning of the Saga of Göngu-Hrólf it was specified that King Hreggvidr reigned in "...Holmgarðaríki, which some people call Garðaríki."') Hreggvid is killed in battle and Eirik encounters his daughter, Princess Ingigerd. He falls in love with her and swears he will grant her any request. She asks that he give her three years to find a man who can fight Eirik's champion, Sorkvir, and agrees to marry the Viking if she fails. Sorkvir cannot be defeated unless the warrior is wearing King Hreggvid's armour, and Eirik's counsellor, the sorcerer Grim Aegir, advises him to use trickery to ensure no one can do this.

Meanwhile, Hrolf, the son of Sturlaug the Industrious (of Sturlaugs saga starfsama), is growing up in Norway as a layabout who shows little promise. He leaves home after his father demands he make something of his life. After fighting various Vikings and robbers, he comes to the court of Earl Thorgny of Jutland. Here he befriends Thorgny's son Stefnir, and helps the Jutlanders fight off a Viking from Scotland, named Tryggvi. Two men named Hrafn and Krak come to stay at Thorgny's court. Hrolf and Stefnir humiliate them during a ballgame and they become surly until Hrolf makes it up to them with gifts of fine clothes. After this, however, they disappear from Jutland. News then reaches Earl Thorgny of Princes Ingigerd and her dilemma, and he vows to help her and take her as his wife. However, it is Hrolf who sets out for Russia to fight Sorkvir.

On his way, he meets a man named Vilhjalm, who asks Hrolf if he can become his servant, but later tricks Hrolf into swearing an oath to become his servant and say Vilhjalm is his master. When they get to Russia, they help King Eirik fight off a Tartar invasion, where Hrolf fights and Vilhjalm takes the credit. Hrolf captures a wonderful stag, enters Hreggvid's burial mound, and defeats the Tartar champion, all of which deeds are attributed to Vilhjalm. Vilhjalm is rewarded with Gyda, King Eirik's sister, as his wife.

Now Hrolf is no longer obliged to aid Vilhjalm, he kills Sorkvir and leaves in secret with Princess Ingigerd. King Eirik realises that Hrolf had been the real hero and that his new brother-in-law is a fraud. He threatens Vilhjalm who swears he will kill Hrolf and bring Ingigerd back to Russia. When Vilhjalm catches up with them he persuades Hrolf to accept him as his servant again. As soon as he gets the chance, he betrays Hrolf, cutting his legs off, and takes Ingigerd to Jutland after forcing her to swear that she will say nothing of Hrolf, in return for her life. Meanwhile, a dwarf masquerading as a human named Mondul has ingratiated himself with Earl Thorgny. The dwarf has tricked Thorgny into believing his counsellor, Bjorn, has betrayed him, and has taken Bjorn's status, wife and possessions. Vilhjalm now appears with Ingigerd and boasts of his great feats. Hrolf manages to get to Bjorn's house on horseback, where he hears what has occurred and takes Mondul prisoner. Hrolf forces the dwarf to make good what he has done, and for good measure, to put Hrolf's legs back on. Then Hrolf goes to Thorgny's court and denounces Vilhjalm, who confesses that he murdered his own family, and Vilhjalm is put to death.

Earl Thorgny wishes to marry Princess Ingigerd, but she puts him off by pointing out that her father has not yet been avenged. Hrolf volunteers again and sets off for Russia with the assistance of Mondul the Dwarf and a large army. In the meantime, Tryggvi appears again and kills Earl Thorgny. Bjorn retreats to a castle. Two mysterious strangers help him defeat Tryggvi. Hrolf and his army defeat the Vikings and kill King Eirik and his monstrous warriors, with the aid of Mondul's magic and two mysterious strangers.

Only one of the strangers survives; he turns out to be Hrafn, while his dead brother is Krak. Hrafn's real name, however, is Harald, and he is the son of Edgar, king of England, who has had his throne usurped. They return to Jutland in time for Thorgny's funeral feast, after which Hrolf agrees to aid Harald regain his throne from the usurper. Returning from England, Hrolf marries Ingigerd, and they go on to rule over Russia. They have many children, including Olaf who is king of Gardar during the time of Hromund Gripsson (of Hrómundar saga Gripssonar). The saga states that it is not known whether Hrolf died in battle or bed.

== Bibliography ==
- Mägi, Marika (2018). In Austrvegr: The Role of the Eastern Baltic in Viking Age Communication across the Baltic Sea. Leiden: Brill. p. 512. ISBN 9789004363816.

== English translation ==
- Pálsson, Hermann Göngu-Hrolfs Saga (Edinburgh, Scotland: Canongate, 1980)
