= Óttar (mythology) =

Lover of the Norse goddess Freyja

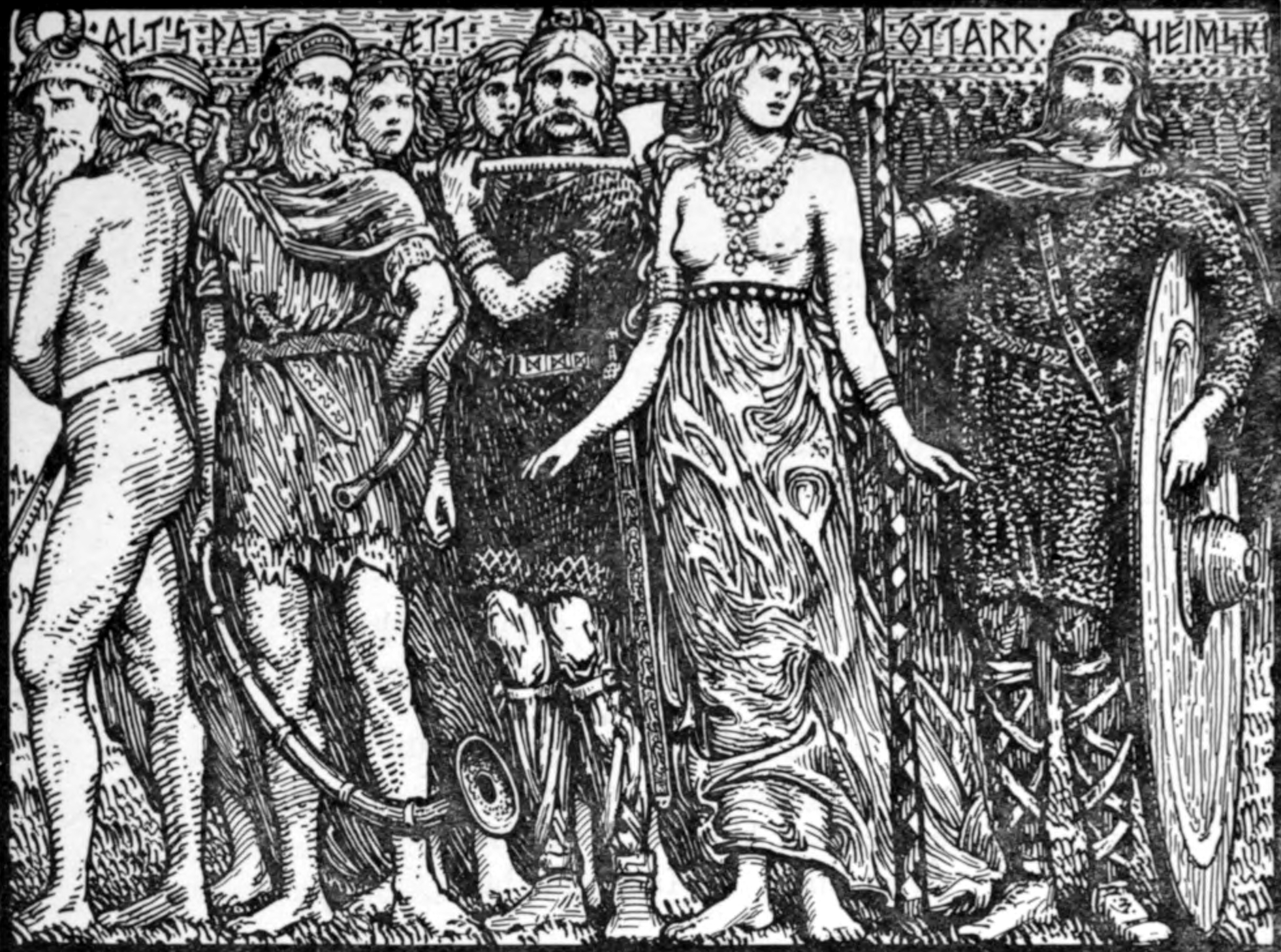
"The Ancestry of Ottar" (1908) by W. G. Collingwood

In Norse mythology, Óttar, also known as Óttar the Simple, is a protégé and human lover of the goddess Freyja. He appeared in Hyndluljóð (the Lay of Hyndla), a poem in the Poetic Edda. In this tale, Óttar is said to be very pious to the goddesses. He built a shrine of stones, a hörgr, and on it made many offerings to Freyja. The goddess answered his prayers and went on a journey to help him find his pedigree. Freyja disguised Óttar as her boar Hildisvini (the Battle-Swine) and brought him to the gýgr Hyndla, a seeress. There, Freyja forced Hyndla to tell Óttar about his ancestors, as well as to give him a memory potion so that he would remember all that he was told.

It has been theorized that the framework of the poem was created for the 12th-century poet to produce a list of mythical heroes' names. The poem does not connect much to other poems in the Edda, and is often viewed as a semi-historical work.

== References and notes ==
2. Cotterell, Arthur. Norse Mythology: The Myths and Legends of the Nordic Gods. Lorenz, 2001.
