= Harald Wartooth =

Legendary kings of Denmark
- Reign: 8th century?
- Predecessor: Ivar Vidfamne
- Successor: Sigurd Hring
- Born: 7th century?
- Died: Bråvalla
- Issue: Eysteinn Beli; Halfdan (speculative)
- Father: see § Family
- Mother: Auðr the Deep-Minded, Gro, or Gyrid
- Religion: Norse paganism

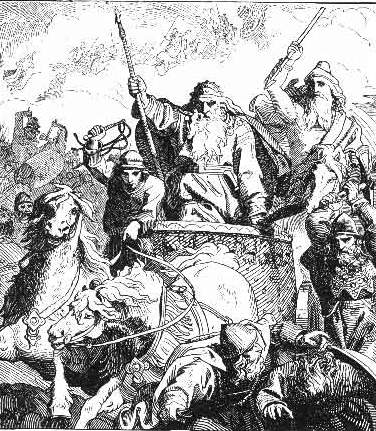
Harald Wartooth at the Battle of Bråvalla. Illustration by the Danish Lorenz Frølich in a 19th-century book.

Harald Wartooth or Harold Hiltertooth (Old Norse: Haraldr hilditǫnn; Modern Swedish and Danish: Harald Hildetand; Modern Norwegian: Harald Hildetann) was a semi-legendary king of Denmark who is mentioned in several traditional sources. He is held to have (indirectly) succeeded his father as king of Zealand and to have expanded his realm. According to different sources, he may have ruled over Jutland, part of Sweden and the historical northern German province of Wendland. He is said to have been finally defeated and killed at the legendary Battle of Bråvalla.

== Name ==
Saxo Grammaticus, in Gesta Danorum, gives two different accounts about why Harald had the name wartooth. According to one tradition, it was due to Harald having lost two of his teeth in battle against Veseti, the lord of Scania, after which two new teeth grew out. Saxo further tells that according to another opinion, the name was derived from Harald having protruding teeth. A scholarly view, however, holds the name to be derived from a name for "war hero".

== Sources ==
Harald Wartooth is stated by most texts to have flourished three generations before the conquest of part of England by the sons of Ragnar Lodbrok (860s-870s). This would place him around the late 8th century, though the genealogy linking him with Viking Age rulers is dubious. However, the sources that mention him are quite late. The most detailed text is Saxo Grammaticus's chronicle Gesta Danorum (c. 1200) which is however complicated by the flow of Danish-patriotic rhetoric, in part a reflection of the Valdemarian age of military expansion. An Icelandic text Sögubrot af nokkrum fornkonungum (Fragment of a saga about some ancient kings, 13th century) provides brief details about his life and a fuller account of his dramatic demise. Shorter accounts are found in the Hervarar saga ok Heiðreks (13th century), Lejrekroniken (12th century), The Saga of Herraud and Bose, and others. A lay about the Bråvalla battle, seemingly written by a Norwegian skald in the 11th century, may once have existed, forming the basis for the extended saga accounts. By far the oldest reference to Harald is a praise poem by Einarr Helgason from c. 980, where the current Danish ruler Harald Bluetooth is likened with Hilditann, implying that the older Harald was seen as a prestigious forebear of his younger namesake. There is moreover a song in the Poetic Edda, Hyndluljóð (12th century) which describes Harald's descent from Ivar Vidfamne.

== Family ==
Most sources describe him as the son of Ivar Vidfamne's daughter Auðr the Deep-Minded (but Hervarar saga calls her Alfhild). According to Sögubrot, Njal's Saga and the Lay of Hyndla, Harald was the son of Hrœrekr Ringslinger (slöngvanbaugi), the king of Zealand. Sögubrot relates that his mother later married Raðbarðr, the king of Garðaríki and they had the son Randver. However, according to Hervarar saga, both Harald and Randver were the sons of Valdar and Alfhild. Njal's Saga adds that Harald had the son Þrándr the Old (hinn gamli) who was the ancestor of one of the characters in the saga. Sögubrot also mentions that he had a son named Þrándr the Old (gamli), but also adds a second son, Hrœrekr Ringslinger (slöngvandbaugi), who apparently was named exactly like his grandfather. Another son, Eysteinn Illruler is mentioned by Hervarar saga; he later became a king of Sweden. Landnámabók informs that Hrœrekr Ringslinger the younger had a son named Þórólfr (Thorolfur) "Váganef", who in turn had the son Vémundr Wordplane. Vémundr was the father of Valgarður (Valgardur), the father of Hrafn "heimski" (the Foolish). Hrafn was one of the first settlers in Iceland and settled on the southern coast, in Rangárvallasýsla (county of Rángárvellir).

Saxo Grammaticus' Gesta Danorum does not mention any Ivar Vidfamne, and gives two different versions of Harald's ancestry. First Saxo writes that Harald was the son of the Scanian chieftain Borkar and a woman named Gro. Later Saxo omitted this and writes that Harald was the son of Halfdan, Borkar's son, and a woman named Gyrid, the last member of the Skjöldungs.

== Claiming his inheritance ==
According to Sögubrot, his mother Auðr fled to Garðaríki with her young son when her husband King Hrœrekr was treacherously killed in Zealand by his father-in-law Ivar Vidfamne. She then married the local King Raðbarðr, and Harald stayed at his court. When his grandfather Ivar drowned during a punitive expedition against Raðbarðr, young Harald traveled to Zealand, where he was accepted as king. Then he went to Scania, which his mother's family had ruled, and was well received and given much help in men and arms. Then he took his fleet to Sweden in order to claim his inheritance. However, many petty kings arrived to reclaim their kingdoms, which Ivar had taken from them. These petty kings thought it would be easy to fight Harald who was only 15 years old. Harald successfully reclaimed his grandfather's domains, so that in the end he owned more than his grandfather had, and there was no king in either Denmark or Sweden who did not pay him tribute or was his vassal. He subjugated all the parts of England that had belonged to Halfdan the Valiant and later Ivar. In England, he appointed kings and jarls and had them pay him tribute. He also appointed Hjörmund, the son of Hjörvard Ylfing, the king of Östergötland. Hervarar saga also mentions that Harald retook his grandfather's domains, but it says that the conquests started out from Götaland (or Gotland depending on the manuscript). The Hervarar saga also alleges that Harald's nephew Sigurd Hring became (subservient) king over Denmark, which is gainsaid by other sources. Sögubrot relates that Hring (Sigurd Hring) received Sweden and Västergötland from his aging uncle, who kept Denmark and Östergötland for himself.

Gesta Danorum agrees with Sögubrot by saying that the conquests began from Zealand, but adds many details. During an early battle in Zealand he was critically wounded by the champion Veseti and barely saved by his mother Gyrid. Later on he murdered Veseti on the latter's wedding night in Scania, and proceeded in slaying King Hader of Jutland and two further petty rulers called Hunding and Rørik, seizing the traditional royal center in Lejre. He was favoured by Odin, so that steel could not hurt him; in return, he offered the souls of those slain by his sword to the god. When the Norwegian petty ruler Åsmund was deposed by his own sister, Harald intervened with a single ship to remedy this infamy. Unarmed and clad in a purple cloak and gold-embroidered coif, he strode towards the enemy at the head of his troops, while the adversaries vainly showered him with javelins. After victory was won, he restored Åsmund, commenting that "the reward of glory was enough by itself". Meanwhile the Swedish ruler Yngve attacked Denmark in order to expand his realm. Before battle had been joined, Odin appeared before Harald and gave him valuable advice about military tactics, especially the wedge-like Svinfylking formation. Applying this, Harald was able to defeat and kill Yngve and his brother Olof. The third brother Ingjald then sued for peace, that was granted. Later on, however, Ingjald ravished the sister of Harald and the war flared up again. After some indecisive fighting, Harald accepted the Swedish king as a friend and brother-in-law. When Ingjald died at a later time, his adolescent son Hring inherited him, while Harald appointed suitable guardians for the boy.

A new incident in Norway draw Harald's attention, as King Olaf of the Thrøndir was attacked by the shield-maidens Stikla and Rusla. Again reacting to undue female agency, Harald intervened and slew the two women in person. He next overcame a Frisian raider called Ubbe who had attacked Jutland. When Ubbe was captured after great feats of strength, he agreed to become Harald's housecarl and married one of the sisters of the king. Harald furthermore undertook successful expeditions of conquest along the Rhine, in the lands of the Slavs, Aquitania, and Humbria in England. His fame attracted warriors from various parts of the world, who formed a mercenary guard. The mighty Danish ruler spent 50 years in peace, meanwhile subjecting his personal troops to hard military drill.

== The Battle of Bråvalla ==
When Harald realized that he was about to die of old age, he suggested to Hring, king of Sweden, that a great battle should be fought between them. The place was chosen to be at the moor of Bråvalla, and so the legendary Battle of Bråvalla came to be. Harald hoped to die in this battle and go to Valhalla instead of dying in his bed and end up in Niflheim. The Gesta Danorum gives a partly different background to the war. Harald and his nephew Hring of Sweden both trusted a councilor called Brune. When Brune drowned on a journey, Odin, who had by now abandoned Harald's cause, took his likeness and began to weave a web of intrigues, successfully pitting the two kings against each other. The opposing sides therefore spent seven years in military preparations. By this time, Harald's old age and cruelty had made him a burden to his subjects. Hring gathered warriors from Sweden, Västergötland and Norway, while Harald assembled troops from Denmark, the Baltic region and Germany.

The two armies finally moved by sea and land towards the fixed place of the contest at Bråvalla. Sögubrot says that this was a moor beneath the forest of Kolmården, close to the Bråviken bay in Östergötland. Hring came first to the battle site and bade his army to rest until the Danes arrived. This took time for the ships were so thick upon the Kattegat that one could walk across the Sound on the ships from Zealand to Skåne as if there was a bridge. When the armies finally opposed each other, Harald found to his consternation that the Swedish army applied the Svinfylking formation that had so often secured victory to the Danes. The Gesta Danorum makes clear that this formed part of Odin's sinister game. The kings encouraged their warriors to attack without holding back. The lur horns sounded and the battle cries rose up. The battle began with an exchange of spears and arrows and even then, at the first, of the battle blood flowed upon the ground. Then swords were drawn and warrior fought against warrior. The most ferocious champion on Harald's side was Ubbe the Frisian who killed scores of enemies before being shot down by Norwegian archers. Stærkod, on Hring's side, fought first with Ubbe the Frisian and received of him six wounds before the combatants drifted apart in the chaos. Then he fought with the shield maiden, Veborg, who struck him in the face so that his beard dangled loose, but he bit his beard to hold on to it. Then he met the shield maiden, Visne. "You hurry to your death!" she shouted. "Now, you shall die!" "No," he cried, "not before you have lost King Harald's standard." At that instant he struck her hand and went on.

Blind, old King Harald rode out into the fray in a chariot with a sword in each hand and struck away at the enemy. Eventually Harald fell in the battle, according to the Gesta Danorum by Odin's own hand. The god steered the royal chariot in the shape of Brune and bludgeoned the king with a club (since he was hard against steel). Along with him fell 15 kings and 30,000 free-born men. When Hring heard that his opponent had fallen, he instantly gave the sign that the fighting should cease. The day after the battle he sought out King Harald's body and put it onto a funeral pyre along with his horse. Hring stood before the fire and bade Harald ride straight to Valhalla and secure lodging for those who had perished. Thereafter, all the chiefs walked around the pyre throwing weapons and gold onto it. Sigurd Hring, traditionally the father of Ragnar Lodbrok, became the ruler of both Denmark and Sweden but not, it seems, of Norway which was then a patchwork of petty kingdoms.

== Historical origins ==
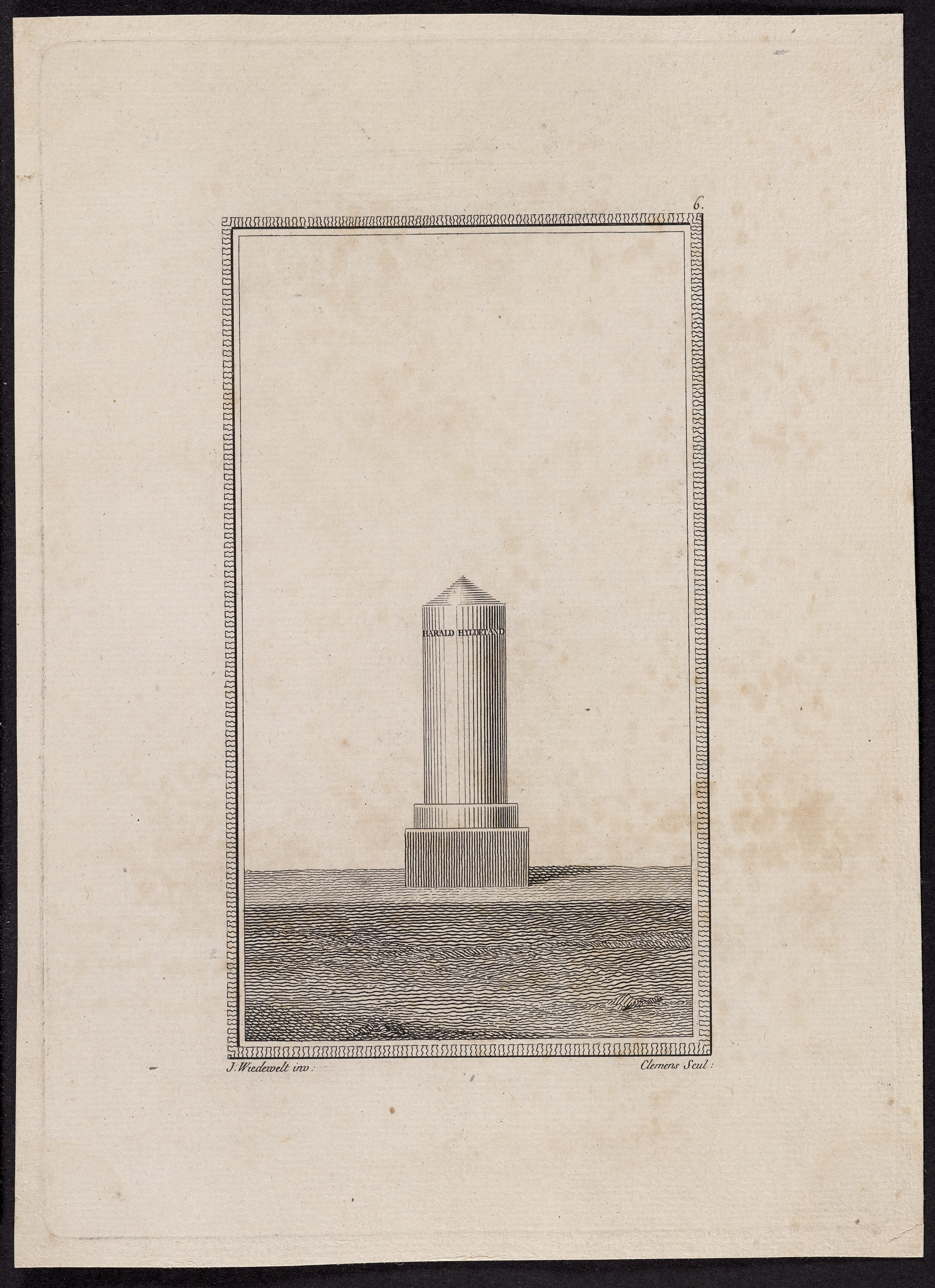
Memorial to Harald Wartooth designed by Johannes Wiedewelt in Jægerspris Memorial Park at Jægerspris Castle, Denmark.

The historicity of Harald Wartooth and the Battle of Bråvalla has been much debated over the time. Once seen as an essentially historical event taking place in about 740 or 750, the battle has undergone a number of reinterpretations. Paul Herrmann (1922) saw Harald as an "Odin hero" in an (originally) epically cohesive tale, without denying the possibility of a historical kernel. The saga scholar Axel Olrik (1914) regarded Harald as a historical Danish king who attacked an East Geatic King Hring. Though victorious, the East Geats were weakened and subsequently dominated by the Swedes. The archaeologist Birger Nerman (1925), on the other hand, argued that Harald was indeed the overlord over a comprehensive Danish-Swedish realm, while Hring was a sub-king with authority over Sweden, Västergötland and Gotland. By defeating Harald in the mid 8th century, the Swedes were supposedly able to subordinate Östergötland. Later, Stig Wikander (1960) hypothesized that the battle was an eschatological myth with parallels to Indian mythology, an idea that has been endorsed by some modern scholars. The Reallexikon der Germanischen Altertumskunde (1999) suggests that the battle has "perhaps certainly" a legendary and fictitious basis, and that the location to Östergötland is likely a later literary addition.

Most modern Scandinavian historians decline to discuss the background of Harald and the battle due to the late sources. Frankish sources name three Danish kings of the 8th century, namely Angantyr (early 8th century), Sigfred (fl. 777-798) and Harald (years unknown, but older kinsman of a set of brothers who flourished after 812). An annal entry of 813 shows that the rivals of this Harald's nephews sought support in the struggle for Danish kingship among the Swedes, successfully ousting Harald's kin. Whether vague memories of this dynastic contest are reflected in Harald Wartooth's story is a moot point.

== See also ==
- List of legendary kings of Denmark
- List of legendary kings of Sweden

== Primary sources ==
- Chronicon Lethrense
- Gesta Danorum
- Hervarar saga
- Landnámabók
- Lay of Hyndla
- Njal's Saga
- Sögubrot
- Upplendinga Konungum
- Ynglinga saga

== Secondary sources ==
- Andersson, Ingvar (1947). Skånes historia: till Saxo och Skånelagen. Stockholm: Norstedts.
- Baldwin, Stewart (1996) "Danish kings in the 8th and 9th centuries", Medieval genealogy: Selected texts
- Harrison, Dick (2002) Sveriges historia: medeltiden. Stockholm: Liber.
- Herrmann, Paul (1922) Die Heldensagen des Saxo Grammaticus. Leipzig: Engelmann.
- Hultgård, Anders (2017) Midgård brinner. Ragnarök i religionshistorisk belysning. Uppsala: Kungl. Gustav Adolfs Akademien för svensk folkkultur.
- Nerman, Birger (1925) Det svenska rikets uppkomst. Stockholm: Generalstabens Litografiska Anstalt.
- Reallexikon der Germanischen Altertumskunde, Vol. 13 (1999). Berlin: de Gruyter.
- Saxo Grammaticus (1905) The nine books of the Danish history of Saxo Grammaticus. London: Norroena Society
- Tolkien, Christopher, & Turville-Petre, G. (eds) (1956) Hervarar Saga ok Heidreks. London: Viking Society for Northern Research.
- Waggoner, Ben (2009) The sagas of Ragnar Lodbrok. New Haven: Troth Publications.

== Notes ==
Legendary titles
Preceded by Ivar Vidfamne	King of Sweden	Succeeded by Sigurd Hring
Preceded by Sygarus	King of Denmark	Succeeded by Olo
