= Battle of Brávellir =

Legendary Swedish-Danish battle

Coordinates: 58.6073112°N 16.1217578604°E

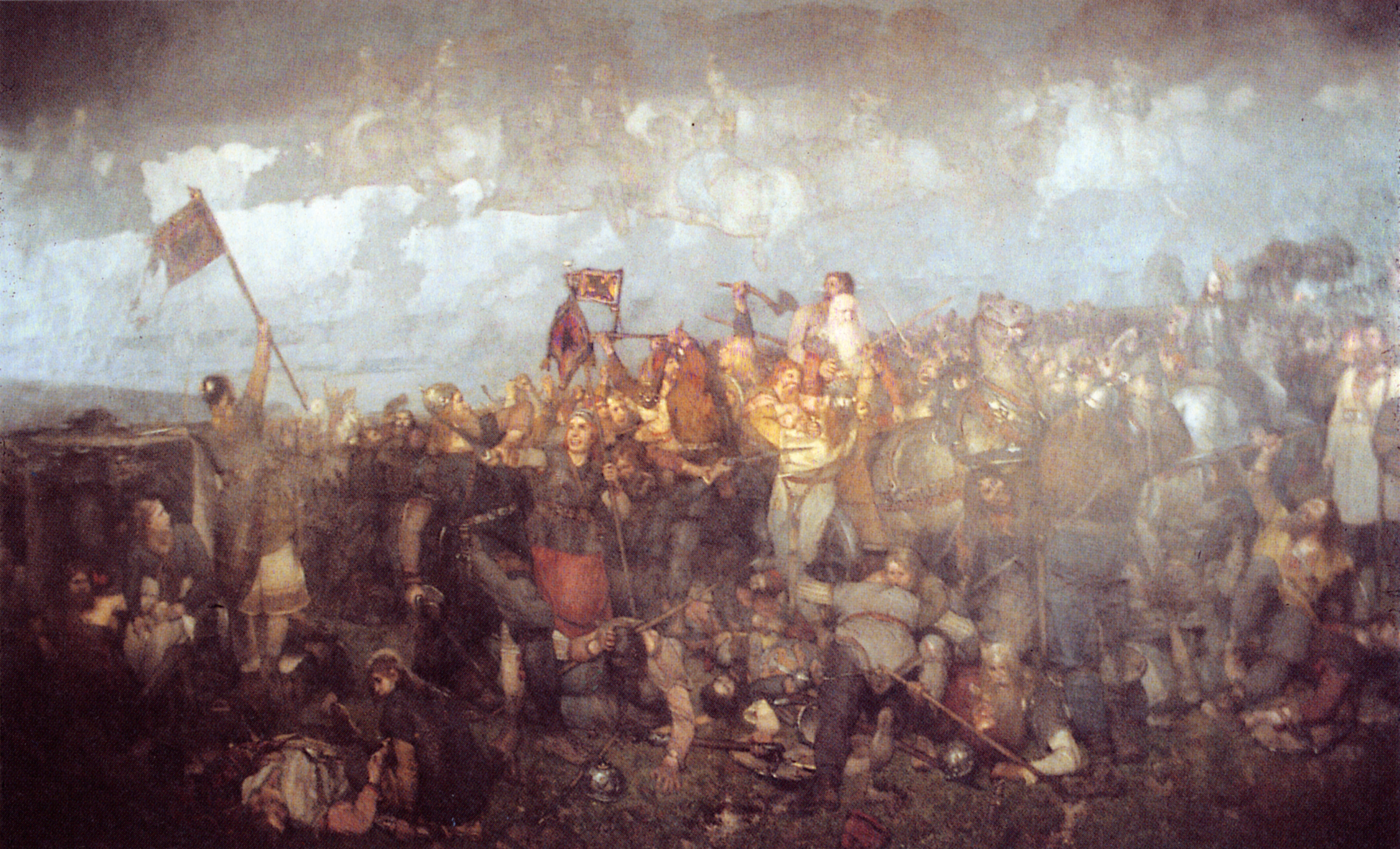
- The Battle of Brávellir, painting by August Malmström.
Date	Mid–8th century
Location	Near Bråviken (Brávik), Östergötland
Result	Swedish victory

Belligerents
Swedes; Estonians; Finns; Rus'; Bjarmians; Curonians; Western Geats	Danes; Eastern Geats; Wends; Anglo-Saxon mercenaries Irish mercenaries Polish mercenaries

Commanders and leaders
Sigurd Hring	Harald Wartooth †

The Battle of Brávellir or the Battle of Bråvalla was a legendary battle, said to have taken place c. 770, that is described in the sagas as taking place on the Brávellir between Sigurd Hring, king of Sweden and the Geats of Västergötland, and his uncle Harald Wartooth, king of Denmark and the Geats of Östergötland.

== Sources ==
The battle is recounted in several sources such as the Norse sagas Hervarar saga ok Heiðreks, Bósa saga ok Herrauðs and Sǫgubrot af nokkrum fornkonungum, but it is most extensively described in the nationalistic Danish history Gesta Danorum by Saxo Grammaticus.

== Cause ==
Harald had inherited Sweden from his maternal grandfather Ivar Vidfamne, but ruled Denmark and East Götaland, whereas his subordinate king, Sigurd Hring, was the ruler of Sweden and West Götaland. According to legend, Harald realised that he was now old and might die of old age and therefore not go to Valhalla. He consequently asked Sigurd if he would let him leave this life gloriously in a great battle. Odin is also implicated.

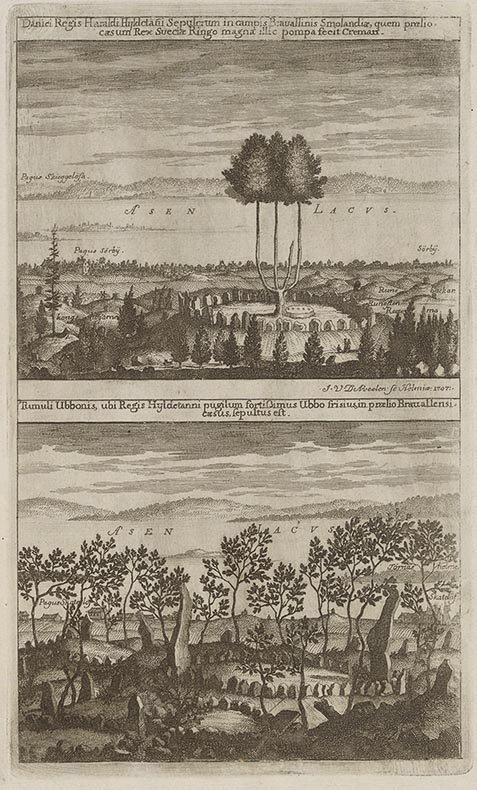
The graves of Harald Wartooth and Ubbi by Lake Åsnen in Småland, from Suecia Antiqua et Hodierna (17th century).

== Preparation ==
According to Saxo Grammaticus, both hosts prepared for seven years, and mustered armies of 200,000 men. Harald was joined by the legendary heroes Ubbe of Friesland, Uvle Brede, Are the One-eyed, Dag the Fat, Duk the Slav, Hroi Whitebeard and Hothbrodd the Indomitable as well as 300 shieldmaidens led by Hed, Visna of the Slavs and Hedborg. Sigurd recruited the legendary heroes Starkad, Egil the Bald, Grette the Evil (a Norwegian), Blig Bignose, Einar the Fatbellied and Erling Snake. Famous Swedes were Arwakki, Keklu-Karl, Krok the peasant, Gummi and Gudfast from Gislamark. They were joined by scores of Norwegians, Slavs, Finns, Estonians, Curonians, Bjarmians, Livonians, Saxons, Angles, Frisians, Irish, Rus', and others, all picking a side. Whole forests were chopped down in order to build 3000 longships to transport the Swedes. Harald's Danes built so many ships that they were able to walk on them across Øresund.

== Location ==
The Hervarar saga ok Heiðreks speaks of "Brávelli í eystra Gautlandi" (Bråvalla in East Götaland) and in Sǫgubrot af nokkrum fornkonungum the battle is said to have taken place south of Kolmården, which separated Svealand (Sweden proper) from East Götaland and is where Bråviken is located: "Kolmerkr, er skilr Svíþjóð ok Eystra-Gautland ... sem heitir Brávík". Saxo ends his account by saying "thus ended the battle of Bråvik". Most historians have held the battle to have taken place near Bråviken, but in the 17th century a minority view appears to have located it in Småland at Lake Åsnen.

== Battle ==
The accounts found in Gesta Danorum and the Sǫgubrot saga are essentially the same.

At first the two armies fought collectively, but after a while Ubbi was in the centre of attention. He slew first Ragnvald the Wise Councilor, then the champion Tryggvi and three Swedish princes of the royal dynasty.

Humbled, King Sigurd Hring sent forth the champion Starkad, who managed to wound Ubbi but was himself even more seriously wounded. Then Ubbi killed Agnar, and took the sword in both hands and slashed a path through the Swedish host, until he fell riddled with arrows from the archers of Telemark. Then the shieldmaiden Veborg killed the champion Soti and managed to give additional wounds to Starkad, who was greatly angered. She was killed by the champion Thorkell.

Furious, Starkad went forth in the Danish army, killing warriors all around him, and cut off the Wendish shieldmaiden Visna's arm, which held the Danish banner. Starkad then proceeded to slay the champions Brai, Grepi, Gamli and Haki.

When Harald had observed these heroic feats, he stood on his knees in his chariot with one sword in each hand and killed a great many warriors both to his left and to his right. After a while, Harald's steward Bruni deemed that his liege had amassed enough glory and crushed the king's skull with a club.

== Outcome ==
Sigurd won the battle and became the sovereign ruler of all of Sweden and Denmark (40,000 warriors had died).

== Historicity ==
The general agreement on the historicity of the battle has turned back and forth during the last two centuries depending on what was the prevalent ideology among Scandinavian historians. In 1925, the Swedish archaeologist Birger Nerman summarized the ebbs and tides of its historicity. He stated that older scholarship had treated the accounts of the battle uncritically and perceived the accounts as largely historical. During the last decades of the 19th century, however, the hypercritical school considered the battle as entirely fictional and considered even the area where it took place as mythical. The pendulum turned and during the first decades of the 20th century, the opinion was once again in favour of its historicity, although the contemporary scholarship regarded it as a fictionalized historic event. In 1990, the Swedish encyclopedia Nationalencyklopedin summed up the debate by claiming that the historicity of the battle is impossible to verify. There is also a hypothesis relating the battle to the events of 827 when Harald Klak was expelled from Denmark.
