= Garðaríki =

Old Norse name for Rus'

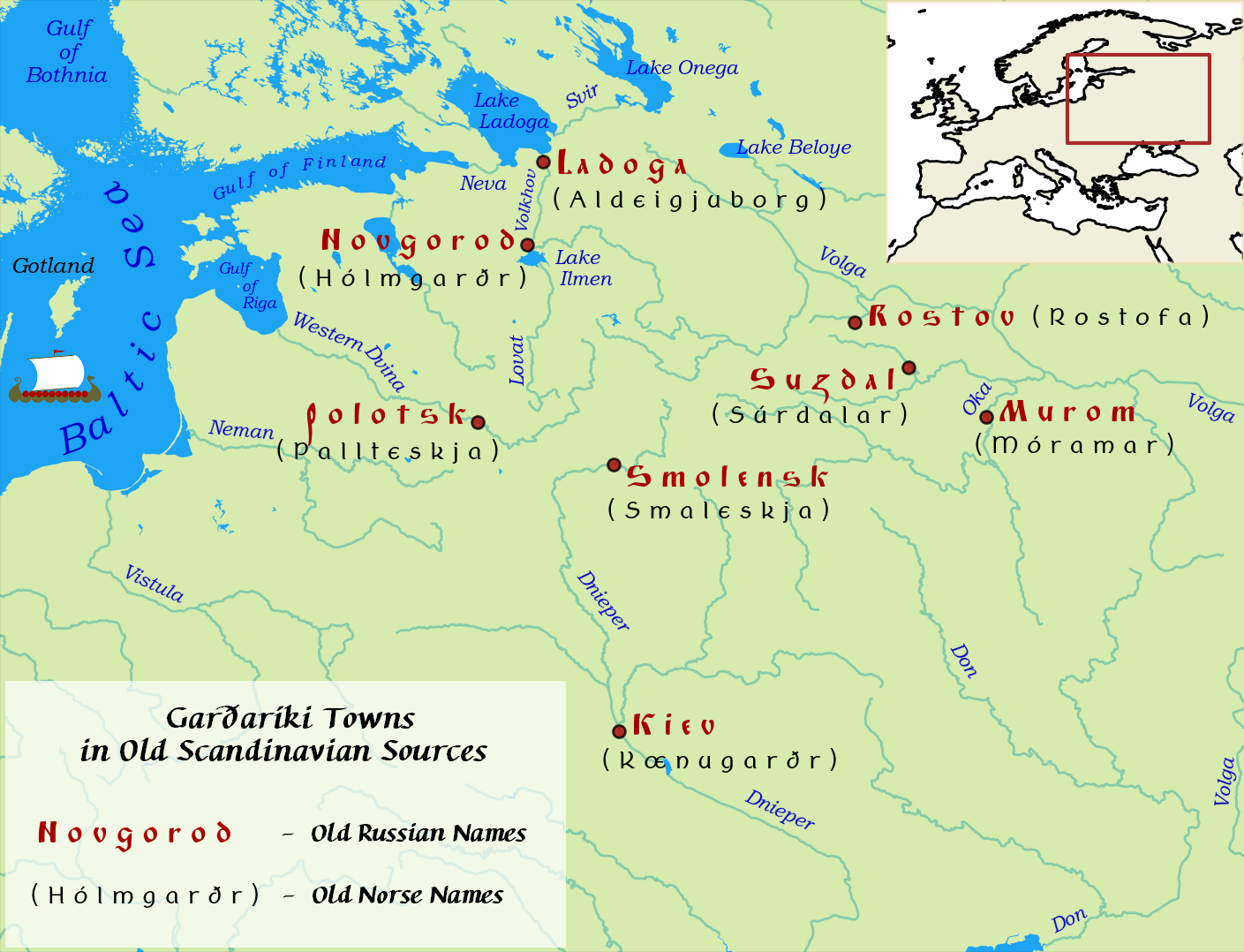
Towns of Garðaríki mentioned in Old Scandinavian sources, according to T. Jackson, E. Melnikova, K. Müllenhoff, V. Thomsen, and A. Bugge.

Garðaríki (anglicized Gardariki or Gardarike) or Garðaveldi was the Old Norse term used in the Middle Ages for the lands of Rus'. (Note: The original name for the lands of Rus', particularly of Novgorodian Rus', in Swedish, Norwegian and Icelandic sources, including runic inscriptions, poetry of skalds and sagas, was the toponym Garðar. First seen in the poem Óláfsdrápa composed by Hallfreðr Vandræðaskáld in 996. The toponym is based on the root garð- with a wide range of meanings.) According to Göngu-Hrólfs saga, the name Hólmgarðaríki (also used as a name for Novgorodian Rus') was synonymous with Garðaríki, and these names were used interchangeably in several other Old Norse stories.

As the Varangians dealt mainly with the northern lands of Rus', their sagas regard the city of Hólmgarðr/Hólmgarðaborg (usually identified with Novgorod) (Note: Today's Veliky Novgorod encompasses Gorodishche, an important administrative and trade center of the 9th century, which was originally known by the Scandinavians as Hólmgarðr. Although its Old Norse name was then transferred to Novgorod, Gorodische later regained some of its importance and served as the residence of Novgorodian princes. Holmgarðr or Hólmgarðaborg is generally identified with Novgorod in literature and research articles.) as the capital of Garðaríki. (Note: Þiðreks saga mentions King Hertnid, who ruled Ruziland and whose capital was Hólmgarðr. Örvar-Odds saga says that all the kings of Garðaríki paid tribute to King Kvillánus who resided in Hólmgarðr. Hervarar saga mentions King Hrollaug, the most powerful king of that time, who resided in Hólmgarðr. Eymundar saga tells of King Jarizleifr as a king residing in Hólmgarðr, the best part of Garðaríki, and ruling over the whole Garðaríki. Göngu-Hrólfs saga represents Hólmgarðaríki (i.e. the realm of Hólmgarðr, the kingdom belonging to Hólmgarðr as its capital) as another name for Garðaríki. Two versions of Göngu-Hrólfs saga speak of Hólmgarðaborg as the main seat of the king of Garðar, equating it to Novgorod of their time (Nógarðar). Þjalar-Jóns saga represents all minor kings as liege lords of the King of Hólmgarðr.) Other important places of Garðaríki mentioned in the sagas that have generally been identified with well known historical towns are Aldeigja/Aldeigjuborg (Ladoga), Kœnugarðr/Kænugarðr (Kiev), Pallteskja/Pallteskia (Polotsk), Smaleskja/Smaleskia (Smolensk), Súrdalar (Suzdal), Móramar (Murom), and Rostofa (Rostov).

At least seven of the Varangian runestones, G 114, N 62, Sö 148, Sö 338, U 209, U 636, and Öl 28, refer to Scandinavian men who had been in Garðar.

== Etymology ==
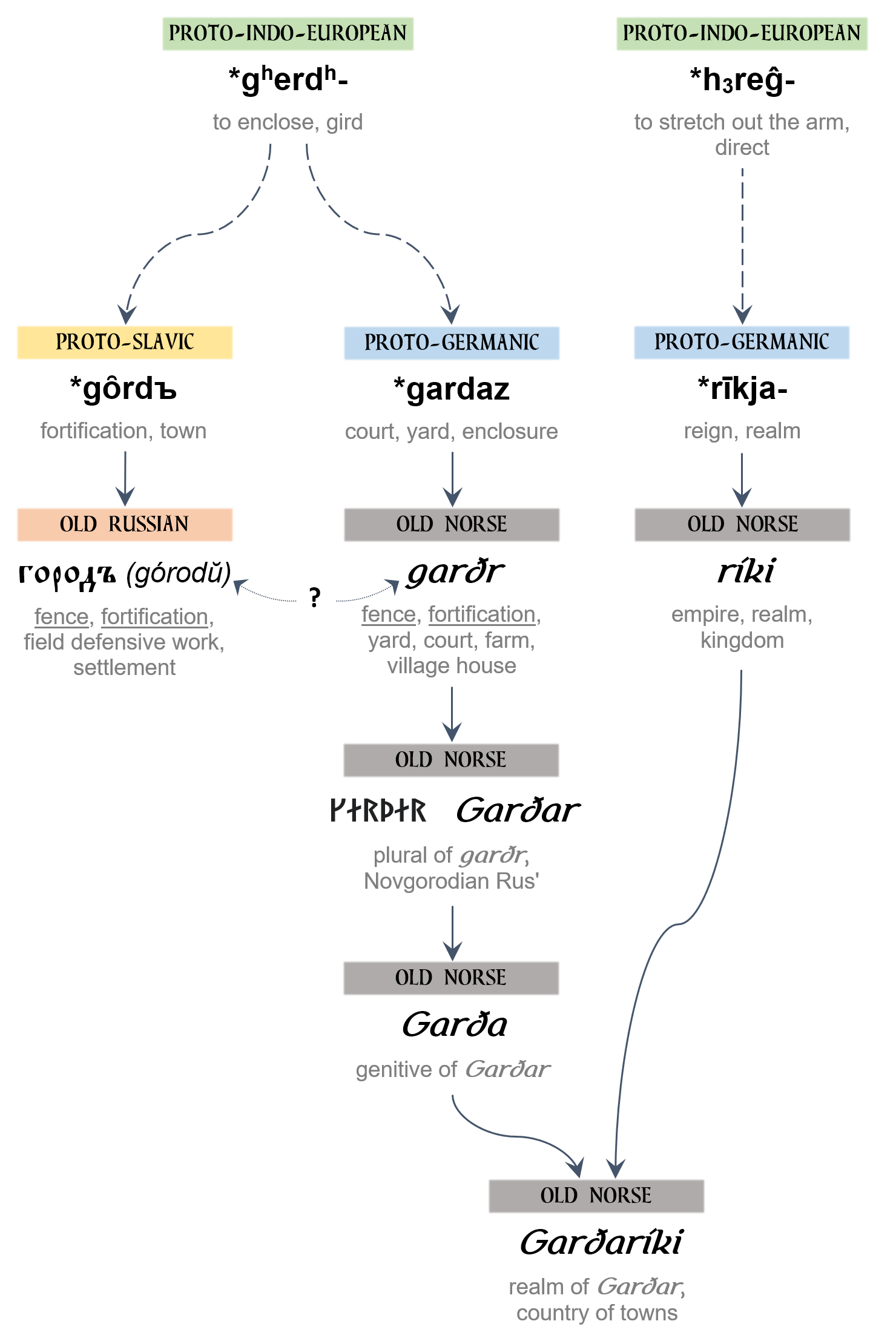
Etymology of Garðaríki according to R. Cleasby & G. Vigfússon, R. Derksen, J. de Vries, P. Durkin, T. Jackson, M. L. Jøndal, J. T. Koch, G. Kroonen, J. P. Mallory & D. Q. Adams, E. Melnikova, E. Nosov, V. Orel, O. Pritsak, H. Rix & M. Kümmel, F. Wachler, and G. Zoëga.

The word Garðaríki, which first appeared in Icelandic sagas in the twelfth century, could stem from the words Garðar and ríki (an empire, realm, kingdom) (Note: Old Norse ríki, Old High German rīhhi, and Old English rīce stem from the Proto-Germanic *rīkja- meaning "kingdom, reign, realm") according to the common Scandinavian pattern for state formations X+ríki. Garða is the genitive form of Garðar, therefore the compound Garðaríki could be translated into English as "the kingdom of Garðar" or "the empire of Garðar". The name Garðar itself was used in skaldic poems, runic inscriptions and early sagas up to the twelfth century to refer to the lands to the east of Scandinavia populated by the Rus' people, primarily to Novgorodian Rus'. The toponym Rússía (Russia) likely appeared after most of the sagas had been written, in the 13th–14th centuries.

Garðar is a plural form of the Old Norse word garðr which referred to 1) a fence; 2) a fortification; 3) a yard; 4) a court; 5) a farm; 6) a village house, (Note: Old Norse garðr, Old High German gart(o) ("garden, enclosure"), as well as Old English ġeard ("courtyard, enclosure") go back to the Proto-Germanic *gardaz or *ʒarðaz) while the related Old Russian word городъ (Note: Old Russian городъ, Old Church Slavic градъ, and Russian город stem from the Proto-Slavic *gȏrdъ meaning "fortification, town".) referred to 1) a fence; 2) a fortification; 3) a field defensive work; 4) a settlement. Since there is an overlapping meaning among the ones these related words once had ("a fence, a fortified place"), both garðr and городъ could mean the same at one time in the past. Thus, some researches interpreted Garðar as a collective name for Old Rus' towns encountered by Scandinavians on their way from Lyubsha and Ladoga down the Volkhov River into other Slavonic lands. The younger toponym Garðaríki could mean "the realm of towns", or "the country of towns".

== Legendary kings ==
- Odin (Hervarar saga)
- Sigrlami (Hervarar saga)
- Rollaugr or Hrollaugr (Hervarar saga)
- Ivar Vidfamne (Hervarar saga)
- Ráðbarðr (Sögubrot)
- Hreggviðr (Göngu-Hrólfs saga)
- Hálfdan Brönufostri (king of Svíþjóð hin kalda in Sörla saga sterka) (Note: Some scholars linked Svíþjóð hin kalda or "Sweden the Cold" to the ancient Sarmatia and assumed that Gardariki was located there.)
- Vissavald (king from Garðaríki, Óláfs saga Tryggvasonar)
- Hertnið (king of Ruziland, Þiðreks saga)

== See also ==
- Rus' Khaganate
- Kievan Rus

== Literature ==
- Brandt, Dagmar: Gardariki. Ein Stufenbuch aus dem russischen Raum (novel). 2 Volumes, Berlin 1943. Reprint Faksimile Verlag Bremen 1981.
- Jakobsson, Sverrir, The Varangians: In God’s Holy Fire (Palgrave Macmillan, 2020), ISBN 978-3-030-53796-8
