= Hyndluljóð =

Old Norse poem often considered part of the Poetic Edda

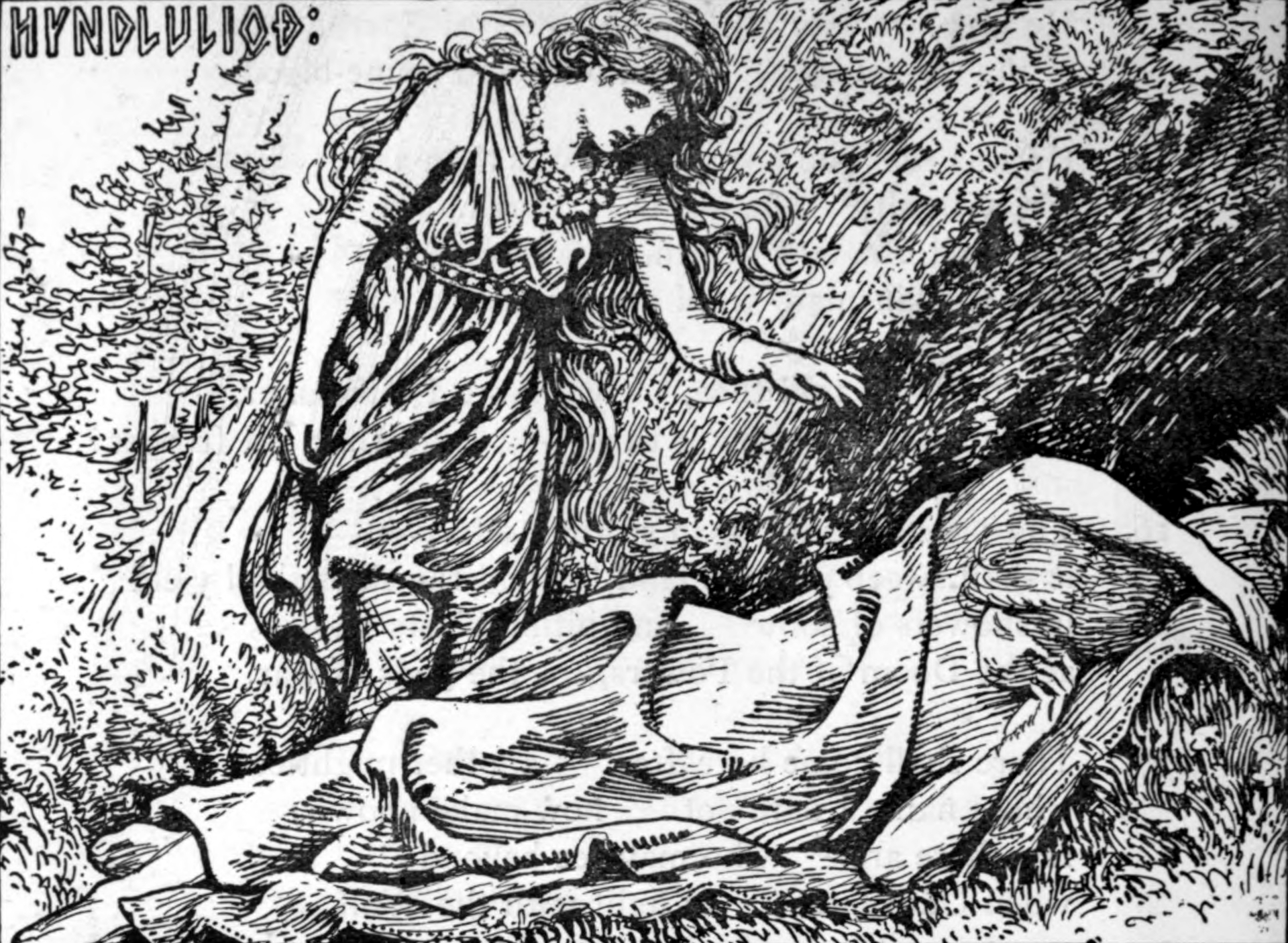
"Freyja awakes Hyndla" (1908) by W. G. Collingwood.

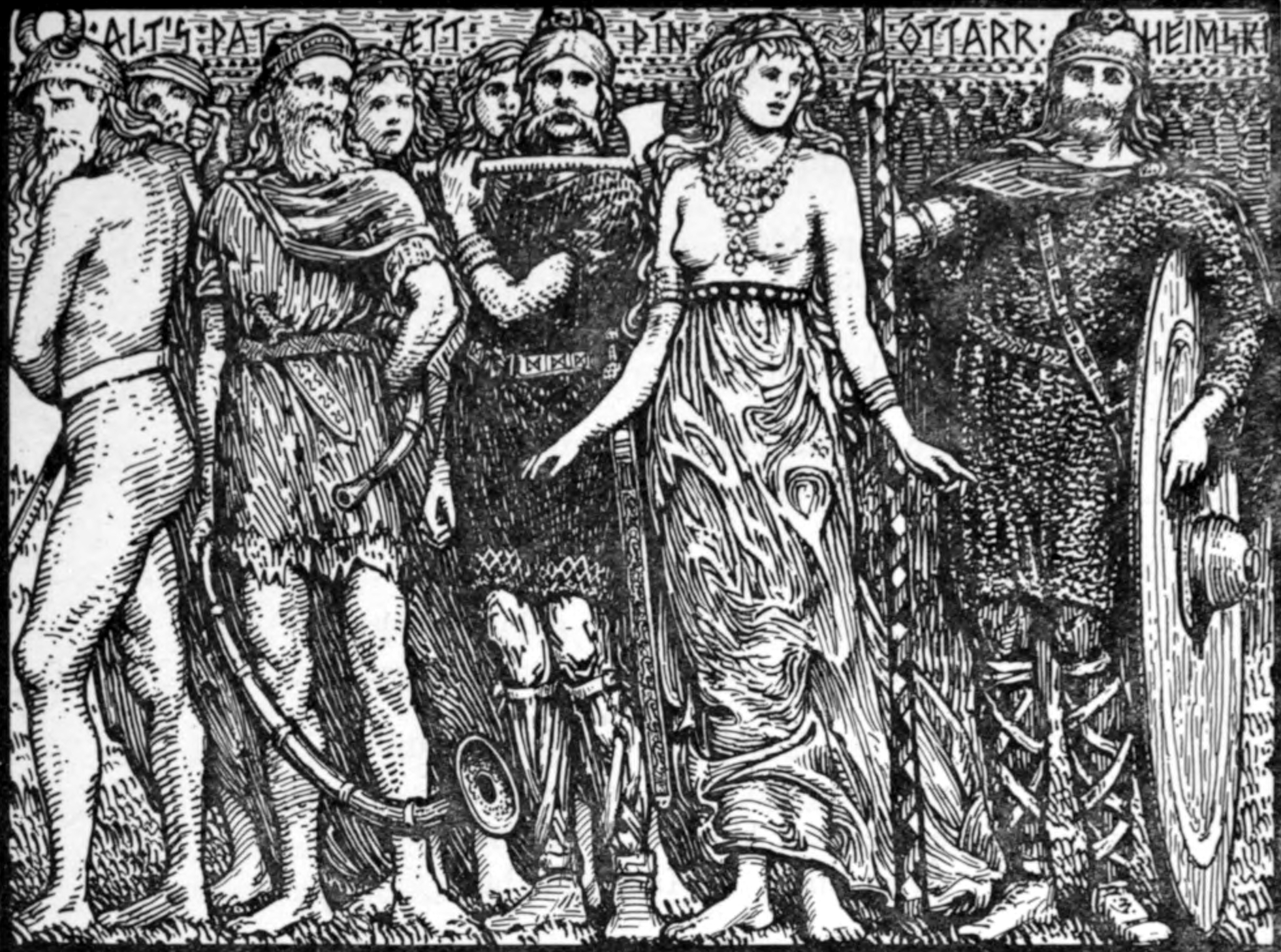
"The Ancestry of Ottar" (1908) by W. G. Collingwood.

Hyndluljóð (Old Norse: 'The Lay of Hyndla') is an Old Norse poem often considered a part of the Poetic Edda. It is preserved in its entirety only in Flateyjarbók, but some stanzas are also quoted in the Prose Edda, where they are said to come from Völuspá hin skamma.

== Dating ==
Hyndluljóð is believed to be a relatively late Eddic poem, dating to the second half of the 12th century or later, although including much older traditions, such as that of the 4th c. Gothic king Ermanaric.

== Story ==
In the poem, the goddess Freyja meets the völva Hyndla and they ride together towards Valhalla. Freyja rides on her boar Hildisvíni and Hyndla on a wolf. Their mission is to find out the pedigree of Óttarr so that he can touch his inheritance, and the lay consists mostly of Hyndla reciting a number of names from Óttarr's ancestry.

== Summary ==
Because of the reference in the Prose Edda to Völuspá hin skamma, since Sophus Bugge's first edition of the Eddic poems, stanzas 29–44 of Hyndluljóð as it appears in the manuscript have usually been excerpted as a separate poem under that title. Refrains have led to the suggestion that they were alternative names for the same poem.

== Editions and translations ==
=== Old Norse editions ===
- Hyndluljóð Sophus Bugge's edition of the manuscript text
- Hyndluljóð Guðni Jónsson's edition with normalized spelling

=== English translations ===
- Hyndluljóð English translation by Benjamin Thorpe
- Hyndluljoth Translation and commentary by Henry Adams Bellows
- Hyndluljóð Translation by W. H. Auden and P. B. Taylor
