= Hrolf Kraki's Saga (novel) =

1973 fantasy novel by Poul Anderson

- First edition
- Author: Poul Anderson
- Cover artist: Alan Mardon
- Language: English
- Genre: Fantasy
- Publisher: Ballantine Books
- Publication date: 1973
- Publication place: United States
- Media type: Print (Paperback)

Hrolf Kraki's Saga is a fantasy novel by American writer Poul Anderson. It was first published by Ballantine Books as the sixty-second volume of the Ballantine Adult Fantasy series in October, 1973, and has been reprinted a number of times since. The novel was nominated for the British Fantasy Award in 1973.

The novel is a retelling of the story of the legendary 6th-century Danish king Hrolf Kraki, pulling together and reconciling narrative strands from such diverse traditional sources as the Danish historical chronicle Chronicon Lethrense, Saxo Grammaticus's Gesta Danorum, Icelandic sagas Hrólfs saga kraka, the Skjöldunga saga and the Ynglinga saga, Norse mythological poems Skáldskaparmál and Gróttasöngr, and Anglo-Saxon poems Beowulf and Widsith.

== Plot summary ==
The story is presented as if related by a female story-teller in an Anglo-Saxon court, the author feeling it would have been about that time that the legend would have reached its fullest development, and such a teller would have been least likely to abbreviate it.

The Danish king Halfdan is murdered and his position usurped by his brother Frodhi. Halfdan's young sons Helgi and Hroar go into hiding to escape his fate, successfully eluding Frodhi until they reach adulthood and can take vengeance on their father's killer. On attaining the kingship themselves they rule together. Helgi, a warrior and sea-rover, visits the equally warlike queen of the Saxons, whom he woos overbearingly. Sent packing, he later returns and rapes her, a union resulting in a daughter, Yrsa, who years later becomes an instrument of vengeance when Helgi encounters and marries her. Only after they are wed does her mother reveal Yrsa's parentage. Haunted, Yrsa leaves Denmark to wed Adhils, King of the Swedes, and Helgi is ultimately killed in battle attempting to win her back.

Hrolf, the son of Helgi and Yrsa, is raised in the household of Hroar, becoming his adherent and supporter. During this time the events of Beowulf occur, and are briefly retold as part of the story. After Hroar's death a short civil war Hrolf becomes his successor. He builds up the realm and assembles a band of famous warriors, most notably Hjalti and Bodvar Bjarki, a were-bear and one of a trio remarkable brothers, the others being Elk-Frodhi and Thorir Houndsfoot. The story goes on to relate the personal tales of these champions.

After a reign notable for prosperity at home and successful war abroad, Hrolf visits the court of Adhils to see his mother and attain recompense for his father's death. Feigning hospitality, Adhils does his best to destroy his unwanted visitors through rigged tests of their prowess, while Yrsa warns Hrolf of his treachery. At length the animosity is brought into the open and the Danes fight their way out of Adhil's stronghold, taking his treasure with them. Pursued by the Swedes, they scatter the treasure along the ground to delay them and successfully escape. This "sowing" of the field of Fyrisvellir later becomes a famous incident in Norse legend. But during his Swedish adventure Hrolf manages to offend the god Odin, giver of victory. He returns to Denmark knowing he must henceforth avoid war, as his luck in battle has left him.

The end comes through treachery from Hrolf's half-elven half-sister Skuld, a witch married to Hjorvard, one of his sub-kings. Inciting her husband to revolt, they secretly raise an army and rise suddenly, besieging Hrolf in his hall. Hrolf's champions are roused from sleep and rallied by the chanting of the Bjarkamál, a famous Old Norse poem whose origins supposedly lie in this event; it has been largely lost, but Anderson presents a partial reconstruction as part of his story. Hrolf's warriors fight valiantly, but the witchcraft of Skuld prevails, and after a long, terrible battle the defenders fall.

Hjorvard does not last long as king, being killed by Vogg, a weakling Hrolf had befriended who in consequence had sworn to avenge him. Skuld herself is soon overthrown by an army led by Elk-Frodhi and Thorir Houndsfoot, come to avenge their brother Bodvar Bjarki. The realm goes to pieces, to be eventually pulled back together in part by a remote kinsman of Hrolf's.

== Critical reception ==
The book was well received by many fantasy fans (receiving a nomination for the British Fantasy Award in 1973) though it has been criticized on the grounds that its frequent explanations, especially of the characters' feelings and motives, are incompatible with the saga traditions.
