= Bödvar Bjarki =

Legendary hero

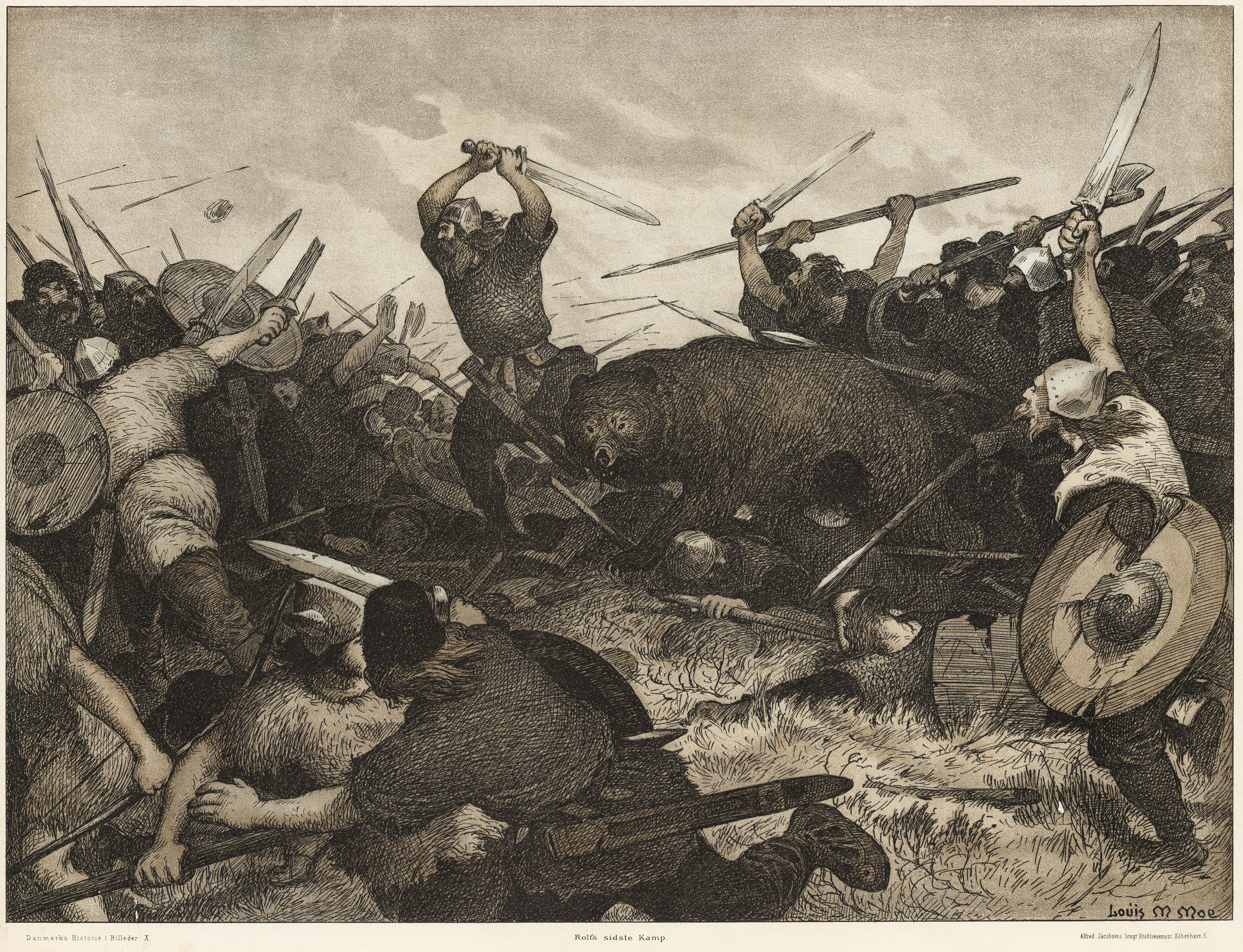
Bǫðvarr Bjarki fights in bear form in his last battle, depicted by Louis Moe.

Bödvar Bjarki (Old Norse: Bǫðvarr Bjarki [ˈbɔðˌvɑrː ˈbjɑrki]), meaning 'Warlike Little-Bear', is the hero appearing in tales of Hrólfr Kraki in the Hrólfs saga kraka, in the Latin epitome to the lost Skjöldunga saga, and as Biarco in Saxo Grammaticus' Gesta Danorum. He is often depicted with the ability to shapeshift into a bear – see Hamr (folklore).

== Legend ==
Bjarki's father, Björn (which means "bear"), was the son of Hring, a King in Norway. After Björn's mother died, Hring married a much younger Sámi woman called Hvit. Björn became a tall, strong young man, and he and a young woman named Bera were in love.

At a time when Hring was away, Hvit tried to seduce Björn, but he rejected her. She cast a spell that made him switch hamr (shape) into a bear by day and a man only by night. He fled to the area near Bera's father's farm, where he lived by killing livestock, and he brought Bera to live with him. Urged by Hvit, the king took his hunters to kill the bear. Björn foresaw his death and told Bera that she was pregnant, telling her what to do after his death. The hunters killed him, and Bera went to the celebration, where his carcass was cooked. Despite his instruction not to eat any of the meat, Hvit pressured her into eating one bite.

Bera had triplets, all boys. The first to be born, Elgfróði (Elk-Frodi), had the body of a moose (elk in european countries) from the waist down. The second, Thorir, had the feet of a hound. Bödvar Bjarki was the third, and he was normal.

All three grew exceptionally big and strong. At the age of twelve, Frodi got into trouble for fights in which he injured people and killed one of the king's men, and he left to become a robber. Thorir became the king of Gautland (Geatland). Bjarki, the last to leave his mother, killed Hvit in revenge for his father's death. When Hring died, Bjarki succeeded him.

After a time, he left the court and visited Elk-Froði, not revealing his identity. Frodi challenged him to wrestle. Bjarki did much better than Frodi expected, but when Frodi recognized him, he thought Bjarki was still not strong enough, so he had Bjarki drink some of his blood, which increased his strength greatly.

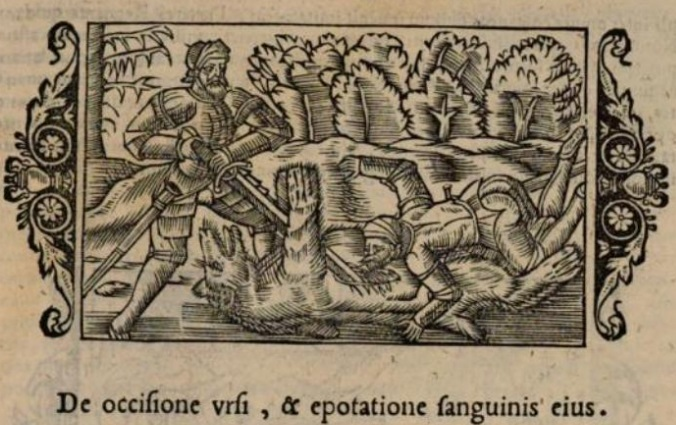
Bjarki forcing Hjalti to drink bear blood. ―Olaus Magnus (1555) Historia de Gentibus Septentrionalibus

On Frodi's advice, Bjarki visited Thorir in Gautland and then went to King Hrolf Kraki's court at Lejre in Denmark. Newly arrived, he saved a weak young thrall named Hott from bullying. That night he fought and killed a monster that had killed many of the king's warriors. He took Hott out to the carcass and forced him to drink the monster's blood, making him strong and brave. They set up the carcass as if it were alive, and in the morning Hott pretended to kill it. As a reward the king gave him his gold-hilted sword and changed his name to Hjalti (meaning "hilt").

One of Hrolf's berserker warriors challenged Bjarki. Bjarki killed him and expelled his berserker companions. From then on he was considered Denmark's greatest champion. He became a trusted adviser of the king as well as a leader in battle, and married the king's daughter, Drifa. He advised Hrolf to go to Uppsala to reclaim the treasure of Hrolf's father from King Adils, bringing about the well-known episode in which Hrolf and his men scattered the treasure to slow their pursuers and Hrolf humiliated Adils. On the way back, Hrolf angered a man who he later realized was Odin in disguise. Bjarki advised Hrolf to avoid war from then on, since he had lost the favor of the god of victory.

When Hrolf's half-sister and her husband rebelled and attacked Lejre, Bjarki stayed in the hall in a trance. Meanwhile, a monstrous bear did heavy damage to the rebels' army. Hjalti, disturbed that Bjarki was not fighting, went to the hall and roused him. But the bear was Bjarki's spirit, or hugr, and disappeared. Bjarki went out to fight, but not as effectively as the bear. The rebels overwhelmed the defenders and killed Hrolf, Bjarki, and all of Hrolf's other warriors.

== Bjarkamál ==
The Old Norse poem Bjarkamál (of which only a few stanzas are preserved but which Saxo Grammaticus presents in the form of a florid Latin paraphrase) is understood as a dialogue between Bödvar Bjarki and Hjalti which begins with Hjalti again and again urging Bödvar to awake and fight for King Hrólf in this last battle in which they are doomed to defeat. As mentioned above, this caused Bjarki's spirit-bear to disappear. As Bjarki puts it on awakening, "You have not been so helpful to the king by this action of yours as you think".

== Beowulf, folk-tales, and The Hobbit ==
Hrólf Kraki Tradition

Hrólf Kraki's saga
Ynglinga saga
Lejre Chronicle
Gesta Danorum
Beowulf
People
Hrólfr Kraki
Halfdan
Helgi
Yrsa
Adils
Áli
Bödvar Bjarki
Hjörvard
Roar
Locations
Lejre
Uppsala
Fyrisvellir

Some think Bjarki and the hero Beowulf in the Old English poem Beowulf were originally the same personage, and others instead accept some kinship between the two, perhaps pointing to the same distant source. Unlike Beowulf, Bjarki is a shapeshifter, and he is also said to have been Norwegian, which may be explained by the fact that his story was written by Icelandic authors who were mostly of Norwegian descent.

However, his brother was the king of Geatland and, like Beowulf, Bǫðvarr Bjarki arrived in Denmark from Geatland. Moreover, his killing of the monster that has been terrorizing the court at Yule for two years is comparable to Beowulf's killing of Grendel. The name "Beowulf" may have originally meant "bee-wolf", a kenning for "bear", though other etymologies have been proposed.

Like Beowulf, Bödvar Bjarki has been linked to the folktales categorized as the Bear's Son Tale.

Tom Shippey has said that the character of Beorn in The Hobbit, by J. R. R. Tolkien, has "a very close analogue" in Bödvar Bjarki.

== See also ==
- Kveldulf Bjalfason

The family tree of legendary Kings of the Danes, according to the Gesta Danorum (Books I to VII)

Kings of the Danes are in bold and marked with a crown (♕). Kings of the Swedes are marked with a dagger (†). Superscript numbers before a name indicate in which books of Gesta Danorum the individual is mentioned.

^{(1)} Humble
KEY
^{(1)} Angul	^{(1)} **Dan** ♕	^{(1)} Grytha	Marriage or coupling
Parent and child
The Angles	^{(1)} **Humble** ♕	^{(1)} **Lother** ♕	^{(1)} King of the Saxons	Succession by other or unclear means
^{(1)} Roar
^{(1)} Sigtryg, King of the Swedes†	^{(1)} **Skiold** ♕	^{(1)} Alfhild
^{(1)} daughter of Roar	^{(1)} Bess
^{(1)} sister of Gram	^{(1)} Gróa	^{(1)} **Gram** ♕†	^{(1)} Sumble, King of the Finns
^{(1)} Wagnhofde
^{(1)} Signe	^{(1)} Henry, King of the Saxons	^{(1)} Hakon, King of the Nitherians
^{(1)} Hardgrep
^{(1)} **Swipdag** ♕†, King of Norway	^{(1)} sister of Guthorm	^{(1)} **Guthorm** ♕	^{(1,2,5)} **Hadding** ♕	^{(1)} Ragnhild
^{(1)} Asmund†	^{(1)} Gunnhild	^{(1)} Guthorm
^{(1,2)} Ulfhild	^{(2)} **Ubbe** ♕
^{(1)} Henry	^{(1)} Uffe†	^{(1,2)} Hunding†	^{(2)} Thorhild	^{(2)} Scot
^{(1)} daughter of Uffe	^{(2)} Ragnar†	^{(2)} Swanhwid	^{(2)} sisters of Swanhwid	^{(2)} Handwan
^{(2)} Thorwald
^{(2,5)} **Frode** ♕	^{(2)} daughter of Handwan
^{(2,3)} Hothbrodd†	^{(2)} **Halfdan** ♕	^{(2)} Ro	^{(2)} Skat
^{(2)} Thora
^{(2,3)} **Helge** ♕	^{(2)} **Ro** ♕
^{(2,3)} Athisl†	^{(2)} Urse
^{(2,3)} King Gewar	^{(2,3)} **Rolf** Krage ♕†	^{(2)} Rute	^{(2)} Bjarke	^{(2)} Skulde	^{(2,3)} **Hiartuar** †♕
^{(2,3)} **Hother** †♕	^{(3)} Nanna	^{(3)} Herlek	^{(3)} Gerit
^{(3)} former King of Britain	^{(3)} mother of the King of Britain	^{(3)} a slave	^{(3)} a bondmaid	^{(3)} **Rorik** Slyngebond ♕	^{(3)} Gerwendil
^{(3,4)} King of Britain	^{(3,4)} Queen of Britain	^{(3,4)} Gerutha	^{(3,4)} Horwendil	^{(3,4)} Feng
^{(3,4)} foster sister of Amleth	^{(3,4)} daughter of the King of Britain	^{(3,4)} Amleth	^{(4)} Hermutrude, Queen of Scotland	^{(4)} **Wiglek** ♕
^{(4)} son of Amleth	^{(4)} **Wermund** ♕	^{(4)} Frowin, governor of Sleswik
^{(4)} **Uffe** ♕, aka Olaf the Gentle	^{(4)} daughter of Frowin	^{(4)} Ket	^{(4)} Wig
^{(4)} **Dan** ♕
^{(4)} **Hugleik** ♕
^{(4)} **Frode** the Vigorous ♕
^{(4)} **Dan** ♕
^{(5)} Kraka	^{(5)} Ragnar	^{(5)} Brak	^{(4,5)} **Fridleif** the Swift ♕	^{(5)} Hun, King of the Huns	^{(5)} Hun
^{(5)} Gotar, King of Norway	^{(5)} Westmar	^{(5)} Koll	^{(5)} Gotwar
^{(5)} Roller	^{(5,6)} Erik† Shrewd-spoken	^{(5)} Gunwar the Fair	^{(5)} Alfhild	^{(5,6)} **Frode** ♕	^{(5)} Hanund	^{(5)} Grep (eldest of three)	^{(5)} 11 other sons (two named Grep)
^{(6)} Hythin, King of Tellemark	^{(5)} Alf	^{(5)} Eyfura	^{(5)} Arngrim	^{(6)} Grubb	^{(6)} **Hiarn** ♕	^{(6)} Amund, King of Norway
^{(6)} child of Hythin	^{(6)} Halfdan†	^{(5)} 12 sons, including Anganty	^{(6)} Ane	^{(6)} Juritha	^{(6)} **Fridleif** ♕	^{(6)} Frogertha
^{(6)} Hanef, King of Saxony	^{(6)} Swerting, King of Saxony	^{(6)} Olaf	^{(6)} **Frode** ♕
^{(6,7)} Siward†	^{(6)} sons of Swerting	^{(6)} sister of the sons of Swerting	^{(6,7)} **Ingild** ♕	^{(6)} Helga	^{(6)} Helge	^{(6)} Asa
^{(6,7)} Frode	^{(6,7)} Fridleif	^{(6,7)} Ingild	^{(6,7)} **Olaf** ♕	^{(7)} Karl, governor of Gothland
^{(7)} Ulfhild	^{(7)} **Frode** ♕	^{(7)} Hather, a chief	^{(7)} **Harald** ♕	^{(7)} Signe
^{(7)} Erik†	^{(7)} Thorhild	^{(7)} **Halfdan** Biargramm ♕†	^{(7)} Harald
^{(7)} Asmund
Kings of Norway

Name spellings are derived from Oliver Elton's 1905 translation, The First Nine Books of the Danish History of Saxo Grammaticus, via Wikisource.

The family tree of legendary Kings of the Danes, according to Hrólfs saga kraka

Kings of the Danes are marked with a crown (♕).

Sigríðr ♀	♕ Hálfdan ♂	♕ Fróði ♂	KEY
Marriage or coupling
Sævil jarl ♂	Signý ♀	Norðri, a King in England ♂	Ólöf, Queen of Saxland ♀	Parent and child
Hrókr ♂	Ögn ♀	♕ Hróarr ♂	♕ Helgi ♂	Yrsa ♀	Aðils, King of Sweden ♂	King of the Finns ♂	Ingibjörg ♀
Agnarr ♂	An elf-woman ♀	King Hring ♂	Hvít ♀
Hjörvarðr, a king ♂	♕ Skuld ♀	♕ Hrólfr Kraki ♂	Björn ♂	Bera, a farmer's daughter ♀
♕ Skúr ♀	♕ Drífa ♀	Böðvarr ♂	Elg-Fróði ♂	Þórir Houndsfoot ♂

The source used for the genealogical information is the English translation by Peter Tunstall, and spellings are from the Old Norse edition edited by Guðni Jónsson.
