= Yrsa =

Tragic heroine of early Scandinavian literature

Yrsa falling in love with Helgi, not knowing that he is her father, by Jenny Nyström (1895).

Yrsa, Yrse, Yrs or Urse (fl. 6th century) (Note: The dating has never been a matter of controversy. It is inferred from the internal chronology of the sources themselves and the dating of Hygelac's raid on Frisia to c. 516. It is also supported by archaeological excavations of the barrows of Eadgils and Ohthere in Sweden. For a discussion, see e.g. Birger Nerman's Det svenska rikets uppkomst (1925) (in Swedish). For presentations of the archaeological findings, see e.g. Elisabeth Klingmark's Gamla Uppsala, Svenska kulturminnen 59, Riksantikvarieämbetet (in Swedish), or this English language presentation by the Swedish National Heritage Board) was a tragic heroine of early Scandinavian legend. She is typically characterized as the wife of Swedish king Eadgils and mother of Danish king Hrólfr Kraki.

Her legacy is recorded in several different versions. In all versions, she is regarded as a desirable and charming girl. The general nucleus of her character arc is that incestuous sexual relations occur between her and her father, Halga, both of them at first ignorant of their kinship. In most versions, Yrsa is forcibly raped by Halga, and both of them learn later on from Halga's Queen Oluf, that they are actually related. This leads to Yrsa leaving Halga, and in one version Halga wants to pursue their incestuous relationship regardless. In other versions, Halga commits suicide from the torment of his guilty conscience.

Yrsa's saga narrative is connected to King Beowulf's narrative. Halga is identified as the younger brother of King Hrothgar who receives aid from Beowulf, and king Hrólfr Kraki's identity as Halga's son is evidenced by the Yrsa tradition. Translators such as Burton Raffel have conjectured an amendment of her name from a corrupt line in the manuscript of Beowulf.

== Scholarly analysis ==
The name Yrsa is not known from other Norse sources and may be derived from Latin Ursus ("bear"). It has been suggested that if she had any historic antecedent, she may have been Frankish and captured by Danish king Helgi in one of his raids. Scholars have noted chronological inconsistencies, in the traditions on Yrsa, in studies on whether there is a historical background. When Aðils was old enough to marry, Yrsa would already have been rather old, and they would have married for political reasons. According to a theory, she would have been the sister of Helgi, and before marrying Aðils, she would have been the wife of his uncle Áli. In this way an emended line in Beowulf (1. 62) would be explained.

== In the Icelandic sagas ==
=== Hrólfr Kraki's saga ===
In Hrólfr Kraki's saga, Helgi (i.e. Halga) went to the Saxons wanting to woo their warlike Queen Oluf. She was, however, not interested and humiliated Helgi by shaving his head and covering him with tar, while he was asleep, and sending him back to his ship. Some time later, Helgi returned and through a ruse, he kidnapped the queen for a while during which time he made her pregnant.

Having returned to her kingdom, the queen bore a child, a girl which she named Yrsa after her dog. Yrsa was sent to live as a shepherd, until she was 12 years old, when she met her father Helgi who fell in love with her, not knowing it was his daughter. Oluf kept quiet about the parentage and saw it as her revenge that Helgi would wed his own daughter. Helgi and Yrsa had the son Hrólfr Kraki (Hroðulf).

Learning that Helgi and Yrsa lived happily together, Queen Oluf travelled to Denmark to tell her daughter the truth. Yrsa was shocked and although Helgi wanted their relationship to remain as it was, Yrsa insisted on leaving him to live alone. She was later taken by the Swedish king Aðils (Eadgils) as his queen, which made Helgi even unhappier.

Missing Yrsa, Helgi went to Uppsala to fetch her, but was killed by Aðils in battle. Yrsa was naturally upset that the man who was closest to her was killed by her husband, and promised Aðils that his berserkers would all be slain if she could help it. She was no happier in the king's company and she was not interested in making up with him either. Later, when a young Swedish warrior named Svipdag arrived to test his skills, she greatly supported him in his fights with the berserkers who eventually were all slain. Svipdag chose not to remain with King Eadils and instead he sought service with Yrsa's son Hrólfr who had succeeded Helgi as the king of Denmark.

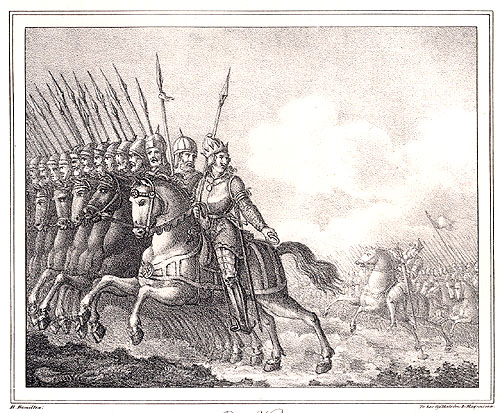
Hrolf Kraki fleeing the Swedish king Adils on the Fýrisvellir

After some time, when Aðils owed Hrólfr not only the gold he had taken from Helgi during the battle, but also tribute for his help fighting king Áli (i.e. Onela of Beowulf) in the Battle on the Ice of Lake Vänern, Hrólfr arrived at Uppsala to gather his tribute. Aðils did his best to stop Hrólfr through different ruses, but had to go away to gather reinforcements. While the Swedish king was gone, Yrsa provided her son with more gold than was due to him. Then she gave Hrólfr and his men twelve of the Swedish king's best horses (Aðils was famous for his well-bred horses), and all the armour and provisions they needed.

Hrólfr took a fond farewell of his mother and departed over the Fyrisvellir. When they saw Aðils and his warriors in pursuit, they spread the gold behind themselves. Aðils saw his precious Svíagris on the ground and stooped to pick it up with his spear, whereupon Hrólfr cut his back with his sword and screamed in triumph that he had bent the back of the most powerful man in Sweden.

Later, Hrólfr was killed by his brother-in-law Hjörvarðr (i.e. the Heoroweard of Beowulf) through treason and when the battle was over Hrólfr's sister the half-elven Skuld ruled Denmark. Yrsa exacted revenge by sending a large Swedish army led by Vogg who captured Skuld before she could summon her army. Skuld was tortured to death and Hrólfr's daughters took over the rule of Denmark.

This account resembles that of the Gesta Danorum, but is more elaborate. A notable difference is that Yrsa is no longer Danish but Saxon, and that Yrsa stayed in Sweden, when her son Hroðulf fled Eadgils with the gold.

The family tree of legendary Kings of the Danes, according to Hrólfs saga kraka

Kings of the Danes are marked with a crown (♕).

Sigríðr ♀	♕ Hálfdan ♂	♕ Fróði ♂	KEY
Marriage or coupling
Sævil jarl ♂	Signý ♀	Norðri, a King in England ♂	Ólöf, Queen of Saxland ♀	Parent and child
Hrókr ♂	Ögn ♀	♕ Hróarr ♂	♕ Helgi ♂	Yrsa ♀	Aðils, King of Sweden ♂	King of the Finns ♂	Ingibjörg ♀
Agnarr ♂	An elf-woman ♀	King Hring ♂	Hvít ♀
Hjörvarðr, a king ♂	♕ Skuld ♀	♕ Hrólfr Kraki ♂	Björn ♂	Bera, a farmer's daughter ♀
♕ Skúr ♀	♕ Drífa ♀	Böðvarr ♂	Elg-Fróði ♂	Þórir Houndsfoot ♂

The source used for the genealogical information is the English translation by Peter Tunstall, and spellings are from the Old Norse edition edited by Guðni Jónsson.

=== Skjöldunga saga ===
The Skjöldunga saga relates that Helgo (Halga) was the king of Denmark together with his brother Roas (Hroðgar). Helgo raped Olava, the queen of the Saxons, and she bore a daughter named Yrsa. The girl later married king Adillus (Eadgils), the king of Sweden. Yrsa and Adillus had the daughter Scullda.

Some years later, Helgo attacked Sweden and captured Yrsa. He raped Yrsa, his own daughter, and took her back to Denmark, where she bore the son Rolfo (Hroðulf). After a few years, Yrsa's mother, Queen Olava, came to visit her and told her that Helgo was her own father. In horror, Yrsa returned to Adillus, leaving her son behind. Helgo died when Rolfo was eight years old, and Rolfo succeeded him, and ruled together with his uncle Roas. Not much later, Roas was killed by his half-brothers Rærecus and Frodo (Froda), whereupon Rolfo became the sole king of Denmark.

In Sweden, Yrsa and Adillus married their Scullda to the king of Öland, Hiørvardus (also called Hiorvardus and Hevardus, and who corresponds to Heoroweard in Beowulf). As her half-brother Rolfo was not consulted about this marriage, he was infuriated and he attacked Öland and made Hiørvardus and his kingdom tributary to Denmark.

Adillus requested Rolfo's aid against the Norwegian king Ale (Onela). Rolfo sent his berserkers, but when the war had been won, Adillus refused to pay. Rolfo came to Uppsala and after some adventures he could flee with Adillus' gold, helped by his mother Yrsa, and he "sowed" it on the Fyrisvellir.

This account differs from Hrólf Kraki's saga in the respect that Yrsa was first peacefully married to Eadgils, and later captured by Halga, who raped her and made her pregnant with Hroðulf. In Hrólfr Kraki's saga, she was first captured by Halga who had Hroðulf with him. Learning that Halga was her father, she returned to Saxland from where Eadgils kidnapped her. In Hrólfr Kraki's saga, Helgi dies when more or less trying to save her from Eagdils, while the Skjöldunga saga presents her marriage with Eadgils as a happier one, and Halga died in a different war expedition.

=== Ynglinga saga ===
The Skjöldunga saga was used by Snorri Sturluson as a source when he told the story of Aðils (Eadgils) and Yrsa. What remains of the Skjöldunga saga is a Latin summary by Arngrímur Jónsson, and so the two versions are basically the same, the main difference being that Arngrímur's version is more terse.

Snorri relates that Aðils betook himself to pillage the Saxons, whose king was Geirþjófr and queen Alof the Great. The king and consort were not at home, and so Aðils and his men plundered their residence at ease driving cattle and captives down to the ships. One of the captives was a remarkably beautiful girl named Yrsa, and Snorri writes that everyone was soon impressed with the well-mannered, pretty and intelligent girl. Most impressed was Aðils who made her his queen.

Some years later, Helgi (Halga), who ruled in Lejre, attacked Sweden and captured Yrsa. He raped Yrsa, his own daughter, and took her back to Lejre, where they had a son, Hrólfr (Hroðulf). When the boy was three years of age, Yrsa's mother, Queen Alof of Saxony, came to visit her and told her that her husband Helgi was her own father. Horrified, Yrsa returned to Aðils, leaving her son behind, and stayed in Sweden for the rest of her life. When Hrólfr was eight years old, Helgi died during a war expedition and Hrólfr was proclaimed king.

Snorri finishes his account by briefly mentioning that the Skjöldunga saga contained an extensive account of how Hrólfr came to Uppsala and sowed gold on the Fyrisvellir.

=== Skáldskaparmál ===
In the Skáldskaparmál, Yrsa's husband King Aðils (Eadgils) requested Yrsa's son Hrólfr's help against the Norwegian king Áli (Onela). Hrólfr was busy fighting the Saxons but sent his berserkers.

When Hrólfr heard that Aðils refused to pay, he set off to Uppsala. They brought the ships to the river Fyris and rode directly to the Swedish king's hall at Uppsala with his twelve berserkers. Yrsa welcomed them and led them to their lodgings. Fires were prepared for them and they were given drinks. However, so much wood was heaped on the fires that the clothes started to burn away from their bodies. Hrólfr and his men had enough and threw the courtiers on the fire. Yrsa arrived and gave them a horn full of gold, the ring Svíagris and asked them to flee. As they rode over the Fyrisvellir, they saw Aðils and his men pursuing them. The fleeing men threw their gold on the plain so that the pursuers would stop to collect the gold. Aðils, however, continued the chase on his horse Slöngvir. Hrólfr then threw Svíagris and saw how Aðils stooped down to pick up the ring with his spear. Hrólfr exclaimed that he had seen the mightiest man in Sweden bend his back.

=== Gróttasöngr ===
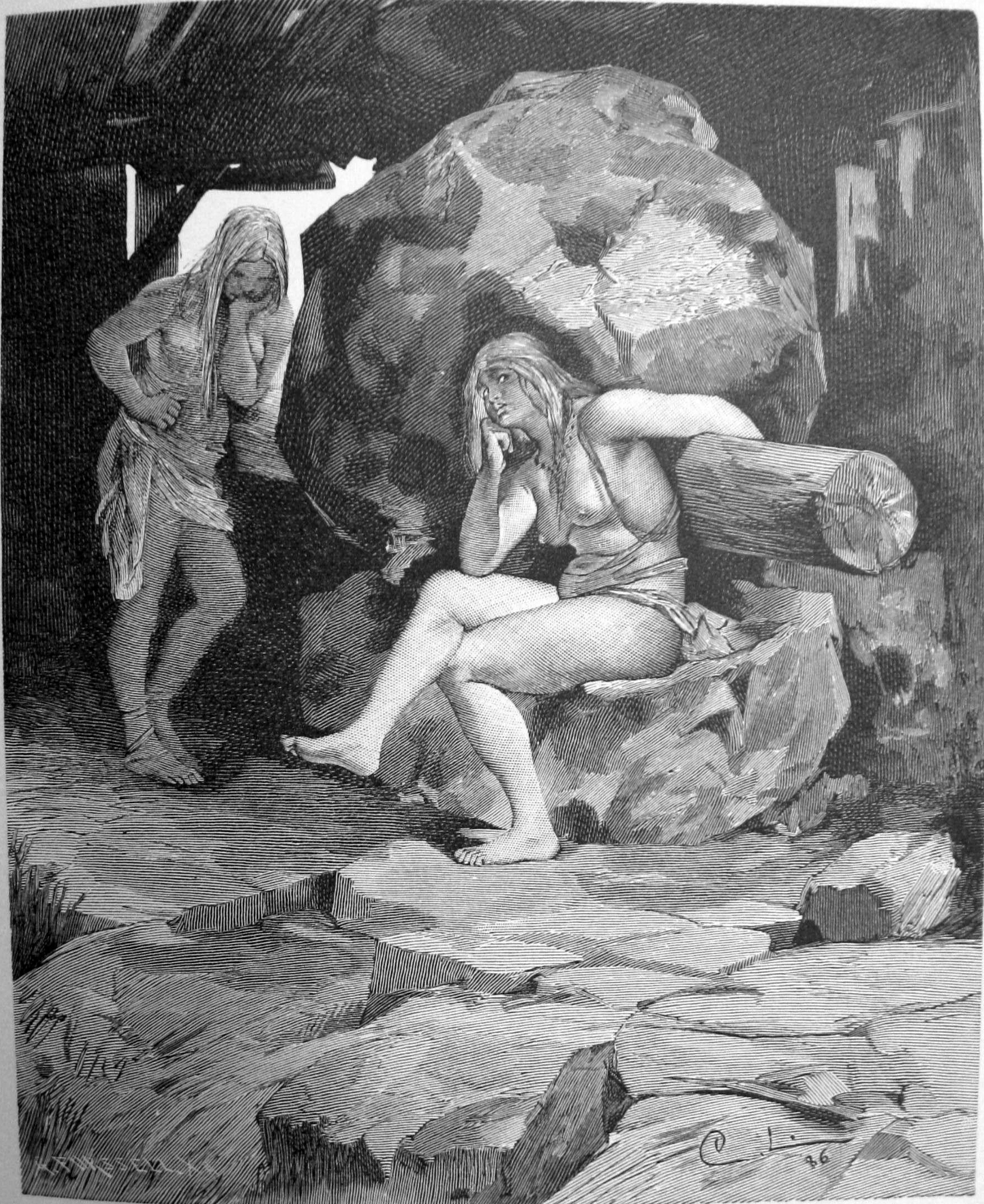
Fenja and Menja at the mill

The Gróttasöngr contains a stanza (nr 22) sung by the giantesses Fenja and Menja. It only names Yrsa and the situation that her son and brother (i.e. Hroðulf) will avenge Fródi (Froda):

Mölum enn framar. Mun Yrsu sonr, niðr Halfdanar, hefna Fróða; sá mun hennar heitinn verða burr ok bróðir, vitum báðar þat.	Let us grind on! Yrsa's son, Hálfdan's kinsman, will avenge Fródi: he will of her be called son and brother: we both know that.(Thorpe's translation)

This piece cannot refer to Hrólfr Kraki's saga where Froda was the half-brother of Healfdene because this Froda was killed by Hroðgar. It can, however, be interpreted through the Skjöldunga saga in which Hroðulf's uncle Hroðgar was murdered by his half-brother Froda.

== In other pre-modern sources ==
=== Chronicon Lethrense and Annales Lundenses ===
The Chronicon Lethrense (and the included Annales Lundenses) tells that one day, the Danish king Helghe arrived in Halland/Lolland (Note: Halland according to Chronicon Lethrense proper, Lolland according to the included Annals of Lund) and slept with Thore, the daughter of one of Ro's farmers. This resulted in Yrse. Much later, he met Yrse, and without knowing that she was his daughter, he made her pregnant with Rolf Krage. Lastly, he found out that Yrse was his own daughter, went east and killed himself.

**Hrólf Kraki Tradition**

Hrólf Kraki's saga
Ynglinga saga
Lejre Chronicle
Gesta Danorum
Beowulf
**People**
Hrólfr Kraki
Halfdan
Helgi
Yrsa
Adils
Áli
Bödvar Bjarki
Hjörvard
Roar
**Locations**
Lejre
Uppsala
Fyrisvellir

Ro is the same personage as Hroðgar, who received Beowulf at Heorot. His co-king Helghe is the same as Hroðgar's brother Halga, and Rolf Krage is the same personage as Hroðgar's nephew Hroðulf. However, in Beowulf, it is never explained in what way they were uncle and nephew.

=== Gesta Danorum ===
The Gesta Danorum (Book 2) reports that Helgo was the brother of the Danish King Ro, but whereas Ro was king of the Danish lands, Helgo had inherited the sea. One day during his sea roving, arrived at Thurø, where he found and raped the young girl Thora, who became pregnant with Urse. When Helgo, after many years, returned to Thurø, Thora avenged her lost virginity by sending Urse to Helgo who, unknowingly, raped his own daughter. This resulted in Roluo Kraki.

During a Swedish invasion, Ro was killed by Hothbrodd, the King of Sweden. Helgo avenged his brother's death and made the Swedes pay tribute. However, he then chose to commit suicide due to his shame for his incestuous relationship with Urse, and their son Roluo Kraki succeeded him. Athislus, the new King of Sweden, thought that the tribute to the Daner might be smaller if he married the Danish king's mother, and so took Urse for his queen. However, after some time, Urse was so upset with the Swedish king's greediness that she thought out a ruse to run away from the king and at the same time liberate him of his wealth. She incited Athislus to rebel against Roluo, and arranged so that Roluo would be invited and promised a wealth in gifts.

When the banquet had lasted for three days, Urse and Roluo escaped from Uppsala, early in the morning in carriages where they had put all the Swedish king's treasure. In order to lessen their burden, and to occupy any pursuing warriors they spread gold in their path, although there was a rumour that she only spread gilded copper. When Athislus, who was pursuing the escapers saw that a precious ring was lying on the ground, he bent down to pick it up. Roluo was pleased to see the King of Sweden bent down, and escaped in the ships with his mother.

This account is more elaborate than that of Chronicon Lethrense and Annales Lundenses. Helgo is the same personage as Helghe/Halga. His brother the Danish King Ro is the same as Hroðgar, Roluo is the same as Hroðulf/Rolf Krage, and the Swedish King Athislus is the same as Eadgils, the Swedish king of Beowulf. Yrse is here called Urse, and the story of her son fleeing the Swedish king with all his treasure is also found in the following accounts. It is noteworthy that all the Danish sources, Chronicon Lethrense, Annales Lundenses and Gesta Danorum differ on where Halga found Yrsa, but make her Danish. The Icelandic sources that follow make her a Saxon, on the other hand, and not Danish.

The family tree of legendary Kings of the Danes, according to the Gesta Danorum (Books I to VII)

Kings of the Danes are in bold and marked with a crown (♕). Kings of the Swedes are marked with a dagger (†). Superscript numbers before a name indicate in which books of Gesta Danorum the individual is mentioned.

^{(1)} Humble
KEY
^{(1)} Angul	^{(1)} **Dan** ♕	^{(1)} Grytha	Marriage or coupling
Parent and child
The Angles	^{(1)} **Humble** ♕	^{(1)} **Lother** ♕	^{(1)} King of the Saxons	Succession by other or unclear means
^{(1)} Roar
^{(1)} Sigtryg, King of the Swedes†	^{(1)} **Skiold** ♕	^{(1)} Alfhild
^{(1)} daughter of Roar	^{(1)} Bess
^{(1)} sister of Gram	^{(1)} Gróa	^{(1)} **Gram** ♕†	^{(1)} Sumble, King of the Finns
^{(1)} Wagnhofde
^{(1)} Signe	^{(1)} Henry, King of the Saxons	^{(1)} Hakon, King of the Nitherians
^{(1)} Hardgrep
^{(1)} **Swipdag** ♕†, King of Norway	^{(1)} sister of Guthorm	^{(1)} **Guthorm** ♕	^{(1,2,5)} **Hadding** ♕	^{(1)} Ragnhild
^{(1)} Asmund†	^{(1)} Gunnhild	^{(1)} Guthorm
^{(1,2)} Ulfhild	^{(2)} **Ubbe** ♕
^{(1)} Henry	^{(1)} Uffe†	^{(1,2)} Hunding†	^{(2)} Thorhild	^{(2)} Scot
^{(1)} daughter of Uffe	^{(2)} Ragnar†	^{(2)} Swanhwid	^{(2)} sisters of Swanhwid	^{(2)} Handwan
^{(2)} Thorwald
^{(2,5)} **Frode** ♕	^{(2)} daughter of Handwan
^{(2,3)} Hothbrodd†	^{(2)} **Halfdan** ♕	^{(2)} Ro	^{(2)} Skat
^{(2)} Thora
^{(2,3)} **Helge** ♕	^{(2)} **Ro** ♕
^{(2,3)} Athisl†	^{(2)} Urse
^{(2,3)} King Gewar	^{(2,3)} **Rolf** Krage ♕†	^{(2)} Rute	^{(2)} Bjarke	^{(2)} Skulde	^{(2,3)} **Hiartuar** †♕
^{(2,3)} **Hother** †♕	^{(3)} Nanna	^{(3)} Herlek	^{(3)} Gerit
^{(3)} former King of Britain	^{(3)} mother of the King of Britain	^{(3)} a slave	^{(3)} a bondmaid	^{(3)} **Rorik** Slyngebond ♕	^{(3)} Gerwendil
^{(3,4)} King of Britain	^{(3,4)} Queen of Britain	^{(3,4)} Gerutha	^{(3,4)} Horwendil	^{(3,4)} Feng
^{(3,4)} foster sister of Amleth	^{(3,4)} daughter of the King of Britain	^{(3,4)} Amleth	^{(4)} Hermutrude, Queen of Scotland	^{(4)} **Wiglek** ♕
^{(4)} son of Amleth	^{(4)} **Wermund** ♕	^{(4)} Frowin, governor of Sleswik
^{(4)} **Uffe** ♕, aka Olaf the Gentle	^{(4)} daughter of Frowin	^{(4)} Ket	^{(4)} Wig
^{(4)} **Dan** ♕
^{(4)} **Hugleik** ♕
^{(4)} **Frode** the Vigorous ♕
^{(4)} **Dan** ♕
^{(5)} Kraka	^{(5)} Ragnar	^{(5)} Brak	^{(4,5)} **Fridleif** the Swift ♕	^{(5)} Hun, King of the Huns	^{(5)} Hun
^{(5)} Gotar, King of Norway	^{(5)} Westmar	^{(5)} Koll	^{(5)} Gotwar
^{(5)} Roller	^{(5,6)} Erik† Shrewd-spoken	^{(5)} Gunwar the Fair	^{(5)} Alfhild	^{(5,6)} **Frode** ♕	^{(5)} Hanund	^{(5)} Grep (eldest of three)	^{(5)} 11 other sons (two named Grep)
^{(6)} Hythin, King of Tellemark	^{(5)} Alf	^{(5)} Eyfura	^{(5)} Arngrim	^{(6)} Grubb	^{(6)} **Hiarn** ♕	^{(6)} Amund, King of Norway
^{(6)} child of Hythin	^{(6)} Halfdan†	^{(5)} 12 sons, including Anganty	^{(6)} Ane	^{(6)} Juritha	^{(6)} **Fridleif** ♕	^{(6)} Frogertha
^{(6)} Hanef, King of Saxony	^{(6)} Swerting, King of Saxony	^{(6)} Olaf	^{(6)} **Frode** ♕
^{(6,7)} Siward†	^{(6)} sons of Swerting	^{(6)} sister of the sons of Swerting	^{(6,7)} **Ingild** ♕	^{(6)} Helga	^{(6)} Helge	^{(6)} Asa
^{(6,7)} Frode	^{(6,7)} Fridleif	^{(6,7)} Ingild	^{(6,7)} **Olaf** ♕	^{(7)} Karl, governor of Gothland
^{(7)} Ulfhild	^{(7)} **Frode** ♕	^{(7)} Hather, a chief	^{(7)} **Harald** ♕	^{(7)} Signe
^{(7)} Erik†	^{(7)} Thorhild	^{(7)} **Halfdan** Biargramm ♕†	^{(7)} Harald
^{(7)} Asmund
Kings of Norway

Name spellings are derived from Oliver Elton's 1905 translation, The First Nine Books of the Danish History of Saxo Grammaticus, via Wikisource.

=== Beowulf ===
The poem Beowulf reads (lines 59–63):

59 Ðæm feower bearn forðgerimed

60 in worold wocun weoroda ræswa
61 heorogar. 7 hroðgar 7 halga til
62 hyrde ic ꝥ elan cwen

63 heaðo-Scilfingas healsgebedda

This appears in Gummere's translation as:

59 Then, one after one, there woke to him,

60 to the chieftain of clansmen, children four:
61 Heorogar, then Hrothgar, then Halga brave;
62 and I heard that – ela's queen,

63 the Heathoscylfing's helpmate dear.

There is obviously something wrong with line 62. A name of a daughter has dropped out, a daughter who was the wife of someone whose name ends in -ela and who was Scylfing, i.e. belonging to the royal dynasty of Sweden. It is likely enough that at some time in copying the poem a scribe was unable to make out the exact spelling of these names and so left the text blank at that point to be fixed up later. It was never fixed up and so the names were lost in later copies.

By Old English poetic rules of alliteration the name of the daughter must also begin with a vowel. The choice is usually the name Yrs or Yrse, since Scandinavian tradition speaks much of Yrsa the granddaughter of Healfdene and wife of King Eadgils of Sweden. This assumes great shifting of names and roles, since Eadgils is the enemy of Onela. Onela appears in Norse texts as Áli. Accordingly, many editors and translators prefer to simply note that the line is corrupt. Others like Burton Raffel render the missing passage as Yrs (i.e. Yrsa), and modern commentary sometimes refers to the marriage of Onela and Yrsa without indicating that this exists only through somewhat dubious conjectural emendation.

== In film ==
A personage named Yrsa is voiced by Leslie Harter Zemeckis (Robert Zemeckis' wife) in the 2007 animated version of Beowulf. Her only role in the movie is to be courted by the Geatish warrior Hondscio.

== Sources ==
- Birger Nerman, 1925, Det svenska rikets uppkomst (in Swedish)
- Beowulf:
- Beowulf read aloud in Old English
  - Modern English translation by Francis Barton Gummere
  - Modern English translation by John Lesslie Hall
  - Ringler, Dick. Beowulf: A New Translation For Oral Delivery, May 2005. Searchable text with full audio available, from the University of Wisconsin-Madison Libraries.
  - Several different Modern English translations
- Chronicon Lethrense and Annales Lundense:
  - Chronicon Lethrense and Annales Lundenses in translation by Peter Tunstall
  - The same translation at Northvegr
- Book 2 of Gesta Danorum at the Online Medieval & Classical library
- The Relation of the Hrolfs Saga Kraka and the Bjarkarimur to Beowulf by Olson, 1916, at Project Gutenberg
- Hrólf Kraki's saga in English translation at Northvegr
- the Ynglinga saga in translation by Samuel Laing, 1844, at Northvegr
- The Gróttasöngr in Thorpe's translation
- Skáldskaparmál:
  - Snorri Sturluson's Prose Edda in the original language
  - CyberSamurai Encyclopedia of Norse Mythology: Prose Edda - Skáldskaparmál (English)
  - CyberSamurai Encyclopedia of Norse Mythology: Prose Edda - Skáldskaparmál (Old Norse)
