= Hrólfs saga kraka =

Danish legendary saga

Hrólfs saga kraka, the Saga of King Hrolf Kraki, is a late legendary saga on the adventures of Hrólf Kraki, a semi-legendary king in what is now Denmark, and his clan, the Skjöldungs. The events can be dated to the late 5th century and the 6th century. A precursor text may have dated to the 13th century, but the saga in the form that survived to this day dates to c. 1400. Forty-four manuscripts survive, but the oldest one of them is from the 17th century, although a manuscript is known to have existed c. 1461 at the monastery of Möðruvellir in Iceland.

The saga elaborates on the same matter as several other sagas and chronicles in Scandinavian tradition, and also in the Anglo-Saxon poems Beowulf and Widsith. In Beowulf and Widsith, many of the same characters appear in their corresponding Old English forms: Hrólf Kraki appears as Hroðulf, his father Helgi as Halga, his uncle Hróarr as Hroðgar, his grandfather Halfdan as Healfdene and their clan, the Skjöldungs, as the Scyldings. Moreover, some of their enemies also appear: Fróðo as Froda and king Aðils of Sweden as the Swedish king Eadgils. There are similarities between Bödvar Bjarki killing the beast at the king's court and the killing of Grendel in Beowulf.

== Summary ==
In Hrólf Kraki's saga, Halfdan (Healfdene) had three children, the sons Helgi (Halga) and Hróarr (Hroðgar) and the daughter Signý. The sister was the eldest and married to Sævil Jarl, with whom she had the son Hrókr. Halfdan was murdered by his own brother Fróði (Froda) and the two brothers had to seek refuge with a man called Vivil on an island, until they could avenge their father and kill Fróði.

Whereas Hróarr moved to Northumbria and married the king's daughter, Helgi (i.e. Halga) went to the Saxons wanting to woo their warlike queen Oluf. She was, however, not interested and humiliated Helgi by shaving his head and covering him with tar, while he was asleep, and sending him back to his ship. Some time later, Helgi returned and through a ruse, he kidnapped the queen for a while during which time he made her pregnant.

Having returned to her kingdom, the queen bore a child, a girl which she named Yrsa after her dog. Yrsa was set to live as a shepherd, until she was 12 years old, when she met her father Helgi who fell in love with her, not knowing it was his daughter. Oluf kept quiet about the parentage and saw it as her revenge that Helgi would wed his own daughter. Helgi and Yrsa had the son Hrólf.

Learning that Helgi and Yrsa lived happily together, queen Oluf travelled to Denmark to tell her daughter the truth. Yrsa was shocked and although Helgi wanted their relationship to remain as it was, Yrsa insisted on leaving him to live alone. She was later taken by the Swedish king Aðils (Eadgils) as his queen, which made Helgi even more unhappy. Helgi went to Uppsala to fetch her, but was killed by Aðils in battle. In Lejre, he was succeeded by his son Hrólf.

Hrólf soon assembled twelve great berserkers named Hrómundr harði, Hrólf skjóthendi, Svipdagr, Beigaðr, Hvítserkr inn hvati, Haklangr, Harðrefill, Haki inn frækni, Vöttr inn mikilaflaði, Starólfr, Hjalti inn hugprúði and Bödvar Bjarki.

After some time, Bödvar Bjarki encouraged Hrólfr to go Uppsala to claim the gold that Aðils had taken from Helgi after the battle. Hrólfr departed with 120 men and his twelve berserkers and during a rest they were tested by a farmer called Hrani (Odin in disguise) who advised Hrólfr to send back all his troops but his twelve berserkers, as numbers would not help him against Aðils.

They were at first well received, but in his hall, Aðils did his best to stop Hrólfr with pit traps and hidden warriors who attacked the Danes. Finally Aðils entertained them but put them to a test where they had to endure immense heat by a fire. Hrólfr and his berserkers finally had enough and threw the courtiers, who were feeding the fire, into the fire and leapt at Aðils. The Swedish king disappeared through a hollow tree trunk that stood in his hall.

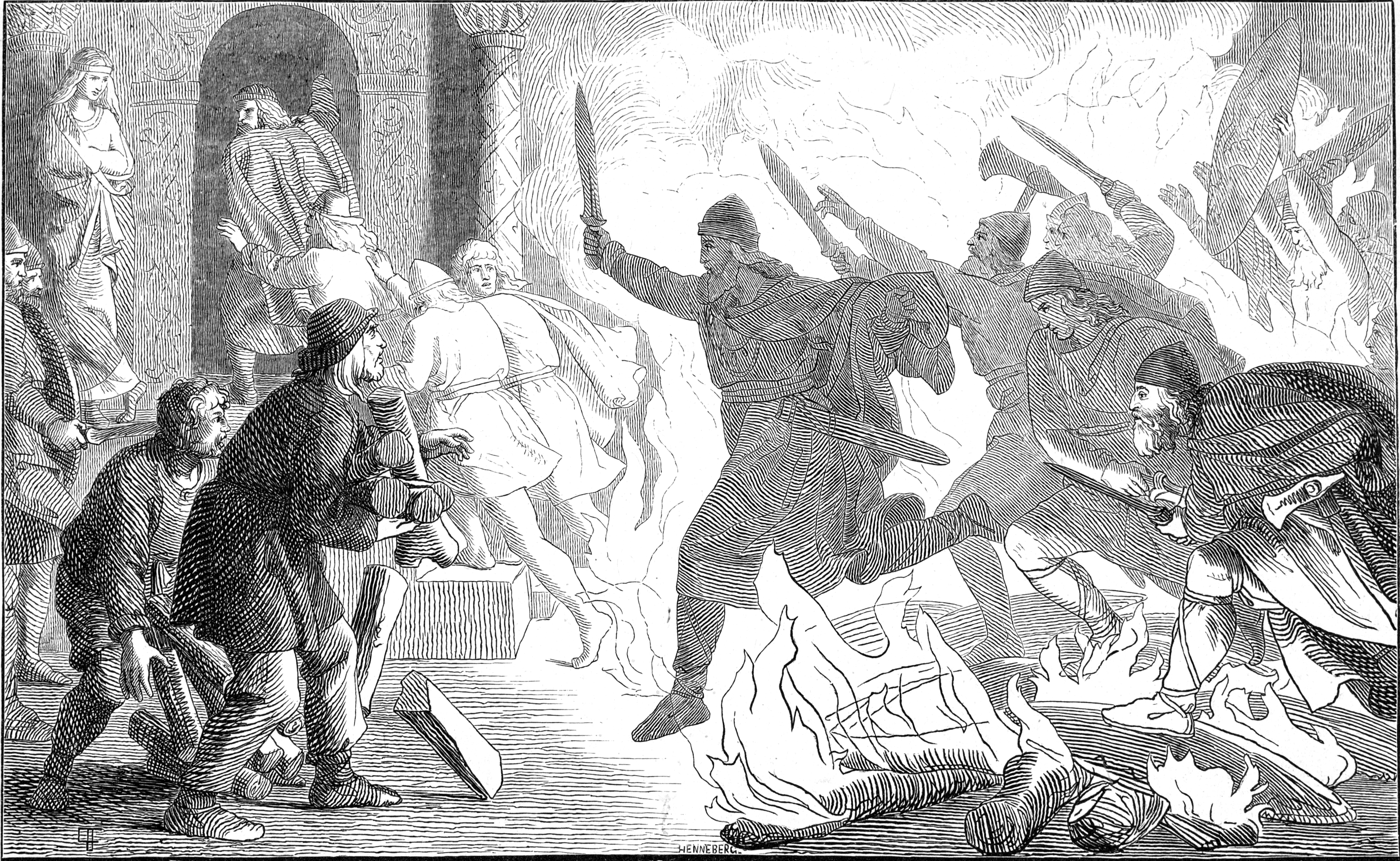
Hrólfr Kraki and his warriors leap across the flames. Illustration by the Danish Lorenz Frølich in a 19th-century book.

Yrsa admonished Aðils for wanting to kill her son, and went to meet the Danes. She gave them a man named Vöggr to entertain them. This Vöggr remarked that Hrólfr had the thin face of a pole ladder, a Kraki. Happy with his new cognomen Hrólfr gave Vöggr a golden ring, and Vöggr swore to avenge Hrólfr if anyone should kill him. Hrólfr and his company were then attacked by a troll in the shape of a boar in the service of Aðils, but Hrólfr's dog Gram killed it.

They then found out that Aðils had set the hall on fire, and so they broke out of the hall, only to find themselves surrounded by heavily armed warriors in the street. After a fight, king Aðils retreated to summon reinforcements.

Yrsa then provided her son with a silver drinking horn filled with gold and jewels and a famous ring, Svíagris. Then she gave Hrólf and his men twelve of the Swedish king's best horses, and all the armour and provisions they needed.

Hrólf took a fond farewell of his mother and departed over the Fyrisvellir. When they saw Aðils and his warriors in pursuit, they spread the gold behind themselves. Aðils saw his precious Svíagris on the ground and stooped to pick it up with his spear, whereupon Hrólf cut his back with his sword and screamed in triumph that he had bent the back of the most powerful man in Sweden.

Hrólfr lived in peace for some time. However, his half-elven half-sister Skuld was married to Hjörvarðr (Heoroweard) one of Hrólf's subkings, and she began to turn her husband against Hrólf. Under the pretext that they would wait three years before paying the accumulated tribute at one time, Skuld assembled a large army which included strong warriors, criminals, elves and norns. She used seiðr (witchcraft) to hide the great muster from Hrólfr and his champions.

They then arrived at Lejre one yule for the midwinter celebrations, with all the weapons hidden in wagons. A fight started and like in the account found in Gesta Danorum, Bödvar Bjarki fought in the shape of a spirit bear until he was awakened by Hjalti. Skuld used her witchcraft to resuscitate her fallen warriors and after a long fight Hrólf and all his berserkers fell.

Skuld became the ruler of Denmark but did not rule well. Bödvar Bjarki's brothers Elk-Froði and Þorir Houndsfoot went to Denmark to avenge their brother. The Swedish queen Yrsa gave them a large Swedish army headed by Vöggr. They captured Skuld before she could use her magic and tortured her to death. Then they raised a mound for Hrólf Kraki where he was buried together with his sword Skofnung.

The family tree of legendary Kings of the Danes, according to Hrólfs saga kraka

Kings of the Danes are marked with a crown (♕).

Sigríðr ♀ | ♕ Hálfdan ♂ | ♕ Fróði ♂ | KEY
Marriage or coupling
Sævil jarl ♂ | Signý ♀ | Norðri, a King in England ♂ | Ólöf, Queen of Saxland ♀ | Parent and child
Hrókr ♂ | Ögn ♀ | ♕ Hróarr ♂ | ♕ Helgi ♂ | Yrsa ♀ | Aðils, King of Sweden ♂ | King of the Finns ♂ | Ingibjörg ♀
Agnarr ♂ | An elf-woman ♀ | King Hring ♂ | Hvít ♀
Hjörvarðr, a king ♂ | ♕ Skuld ♀ | ♕ Hrólfr Kraki ♂ | Björn ♂ | Bera, a farmer's daughter ♀
♕ Skúr ♀ | ♕ Drífa ♀ | Böðvarr ♂ | Elg-Fróði ♂ | Þórir Houndsfoot ♂

The source used for the genealogical information is the English translation by Peter Tunstall, and spellings are from the Old Norse edition edited by Guðni Jónsson.

== See also ==
- Hrolf Kraki's Saga, a novel by American author Poul Anderson retelling the saga.

== Bibliography and external links ==
Editions

- Hrólfs saga kraka, ed. by Desmond Slay, Editiones Arnamagnæanæ, 1 (Copenhagen: Munksgaard, 1960)
- Hrólfs saga kraka ok kappa hans in Old Norse from heimskringla.no
- Saga in modern Icelandic spelling

English translations

- Byock, Jesse L. (trans.) (1998). The Saga of King Hrolf Kraki. London: Penguin. ISBN 0-14-043593-X. (excerpts here)
- Jones, Gwyn (trans.) (1961). "King Hrolf and his champions". Eirik the Red: And Other Icelandic Sagas. Oxford World's Classics. Oxford: Oxford University Press. ISBN 0-19-283530-0.
- Tunstall, Peter (trans.) (2003). "The Saga of Hrolf Kraki and his Champions". London: Northvegr.

Adaptations

- Poul Anderson (1973). Hrolf Kraki's Saga. New York: Ballantine Books. ISBN 0-345-23562-2. New York: Del Rey Books. ISBN 0-345-25846-0. Reprinted 1988 by Baen Books, ISBN 0-671-65426-8. A modern retelling.

Studies

- Anderson, Carl Edlund. Formation and Resolution of Ideological Contrast in the Early History of Scandinavia (Ph.D.). University of Cambridge, Department of Anglo-Saxon, Norse & Celtic (Faculty of English). Archived from the original on 2012-11-22.
- Literary Encyclopedia entry
- Proverbs and proverbial materials in Hrólfs Saga Kraka ok Kappa hans
