= Arngrim =

Norse mythological figure

- hero
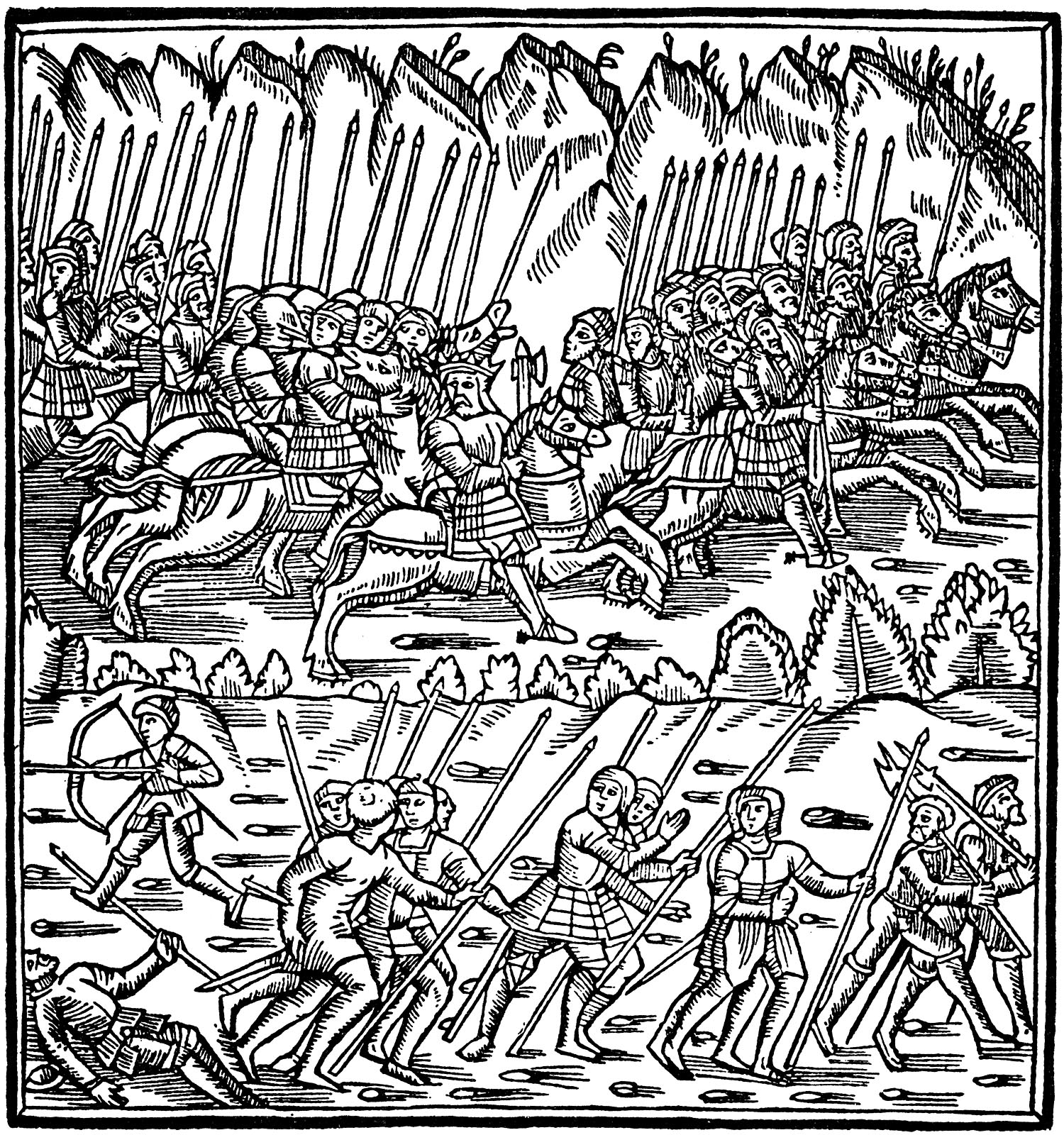
- Arngrim and his men attacking King Thengil's army.
- Abode: Sweden

Genealogy
- Parents: not known
- Consort: Eyfura
- Children: 6 or 11

Arngrim was a berserker, who features in Hervarar saga, Gesta Danorum, Lay of Hyndla, a number of Faroese ballads and Orvar-Odd's saga in Norse mythology.

== Hervarar saga ==
According to versions H and U, Arngrim went pillaging to Gardariki and met its king Svafrlami, who was in possession of Tyrfing at the moment. Tyrfing cut through Arngrim's shield and down into the soil, whereupon Arngrim cut off Svafrlami's hand, grabbed the sword and slew him with his own weapon. Then Arngrim captured Svafrlami's daughter Eyfura and forced her to marry him.

Version R, however relates that Arngrim became Sigrlami's war-chief and won many battles and conquered land and subjects for the old king. In recompense, Arngrim was given a high position in the realm, Eyfura and Tyrfing.

In all versions of the saga, Arngrim returned to Bolmsö with Eyfura (although versions H and U say that it was the island Bolm in Hålogaland). They had twelve sons who all followed in their father's footsteps and became berserkers. According to the U version, they were called Angantyr, Hjörvard, Hervard, Hrani, Barri, Tyrfing, Tind, two Haddings, Bui, Bild and Toki. According to the H version, their names were Angantyr, Hjorvard, Hervard, Hrani, Brami, Barri, Reifnir, Tind, Saeming and Bui and the two Haddings (in version R only six are mentioned: Angantyr, Hjörvard, Hervard, Hrani and the two Haddings).

For the continued adventures of the sword Tyrfing, see Angantyr and Hjalmar.

== Gesta Danorum ==
According to Saxo Grammaticus, Arngrim was a Swedish champion who had killed Skalk the Scanian. This made him very proud of himself and he consequently ventured to ask for the hand of Eyfura, the daughter of Frodi, a Danish king.

However, when Frodi denied his request, Arngrim turned to Erik, the King of Sweden, and asked him for advice. Erik told Arngrim to earn Frodi's respect by killing Egther, the king of Bjarmaland and Thengil, the king of Finnmark. Arngrim first attacked Thengil and crushed the Saami. As the Saami fled they threw three pebbles behind them that they enchanted so that the pebbles looked like three mountains. As Arngrim was tricked he called back his men. The next day, they again started to chase the Saami, but the Saami threw snow on the ground and made it look like a river, and this made the Swedes stop the pursuit. The third day, the battle recommenced and this time the Saami had no more magic to resort to, and they were defeated. The Saami agreed to the peace terms, and every third year every Saami was forced to pay a full carriage of reindeer hides.

Then Arngrim took on Egther of Bjarmaland and slew him in single combat. He then forced the Bjarmians to pay him one hide each. Arngrim returned to Erik, who accompanied Arngrim to Frodi. Erik convinced Frodi that Arngrim was the best possible match for Frodi's daughter Eyfura. Frodi agreed to the marriage and by Eyfura Arngrim had twelve sons.

Saxo Grammaticus agrees with Hervarar saga by giving the same names for nine of the twelve sons: Angantyr, Hjörvard, Hervard, Hrani, Biarbe, Tyrfing, Tand, two Haddings, Brand, Brodd and Hiarrande.

The family tree of legendary Kings of the Danes, according to the Gesta Danorum (Books I to VII)

Kings of the Danes are in bold and marked with an asterisk (*). Kings of the Swedes are marked with a dagger (†). Superscript numbers before a name indicate in which books of Gesta Danorum the individual is mentioned.

^{(1)} Humble
KEY
^{(1)} Angul	^{(1)} **Dan***	^{(1)} Grytha	Marriage or coupling
Parent and child
The Angles	^{(1)} **Humble***	^{(1)} **Lother***	^{(1)} King of the Saxons	Succession by other or unclear means
^{(1)} Roar
^{(1)} Sigtryg, King of the Swedes†	^{(1)} **Skiold***	^{(1)} Alfhild
^{(1)} daughter of Roar	^{(1)} Bess
^{(1)} sister of Gram	^{(1)} Gróa	^{(1)} **Gram***†	^{(1)} Sumble, King of the Finns
^{(1)} Wagnhofde
^{(1)} Signe	^{(1)} Henry, King of the Saxons	^{(1)} Hakon, King of the Nitherians
^{(1)} Hardgrep
^{(1)} **Swipdag***†, King of Norway	^{(1)} sister of Guthorm	^{(1)} **Guthorm***	^{(1,2,5)} **Hadding***	^{(1)} Ragnhild
^{(1)} Asmund†	^{(1)} Gunnhild	^{(1)} Guthorm
^{(1,2)} Ulfhild	^{(2)} **Ubbe***
^{(1)} Henry	^{(1)} Uffe†	^{(1,2)} Hunding†	^{(2)} Thorhild	^{(2)} Scot
^{(1)} daughter of Uffe	^{(2)} Ragnar†	^{(2)} Swanhwid	^{(2)} sisters of Swanhwid	^{(2)} Handwan
^{(2)} Thorwald
^{(2,5)} **Frode***	^{(2)} daughter of Handwan
^{(2,3)} Hothbrodd†	^{(2)} **Halfdan***	^{(2)} Ro	^{(2)} Skat
^{(2)} Thora
^{(2,3)} **Helge***	^{(2)} **Ro***
^{(2,3)} Athisl†	^{(2)} Urse
^{(2,3)} King Gewar	^{(2,3)} **Rolf***† Krage	^{(2)} Rute	^{(2)} Bjarke	^{(2)} Skulde	^{(2,3)} **Hiartuar**†*
^{(2,3)} **Hother**†*	^{(3)} Nanna	^{(3)} Herlek	^{(3)} Gerit
^{(3)} former King of Britain	^{(3)} mother of the King of Britain	^{(3)} a slave	^{(3)} a bondmaid	^{(3)} **Rorik***	^{(3)} Gerwendil
^{(3,4)} King of Britain	^{(3,4)} Queen of Britain	^{(3,4)} Gerutha	^{(3,4)} Horwendil	^{(3,4)} Feng
^{(3,4)} foster sister of Amleth	^{(3,4)} daughter of the King of Britain	^{(3,4)} Amleth	^{(4)} Hermutrude, Queen of Scotland	^{(4)} **Wiglek***
^{(4)} son of Amleth	^{(4)} **Wermund***	^{(4)} Frowin, governor of Sleswik
^{(4)} **Uffe***, aka Olaf the Gentle	^{(4)} daughter of Frowin	^{(4)} Ket	^{(4)} Wig
^{(4)} **Dan***
^{(4)} **Hugleik***
^{(4)} **Frode*** the Vigorous
^{(4)} **Dan***
^{(5)} Kraka	^{(5)} Ragnar	^{(5)} Brak	^{(4,5)} **Fridleif*** the Swift	^{(5)} Hun, King of the Huns	^{(5)} Hun
^{(5)} Gotar, King of Norway	^{(5)} Westmar	^{(5)} Koll	^{(5)} Gotwar
^{(5)} Roller	^{(5,6)} Erik† Shrewd-spoken	^{(5)} Gunwar the Fair	^{(5)} Alfhild	^{(5,6)} **Frode***	^{(5)} Hanund	^{(5)} Grep (eldest of three)	^{(5)} 11 other sons (two named Grep)
^{(6)} Hythin, King of Tellemark	^{(5)} Alf	^{(5)} Eyfura	^{(5)} Arngrim	^{(6)} Grubb	^{(6)} **Hiarn***	^{(6)} Amund, King of Norway
^{(6)} child of Hythin	^{(6)} Halfdan†	^{(5)} 12 sons, including Anganty	^{(6)} Ane	^{(6)} Juritha	^{(6)} **Fridleif***	^{(6)} Frogertha
^{(6)} Hanef, King of Saxony	^{(6)} Swerting, King of Saxony	^{(6)} Olaf	^{(6)} **Frode***
^{(6,7)} Siward†	^{(6)} sons of Swerting	^{(6)} sister of the sons of Swerting	^{(6,7)} **Ingild***	^{(6)} Helga	^{(6)} Helge	^{(6)} Asa
^{(6,7)} Frode	^{(6,7)} Fridleif	^{(6,7)} Ingild	^{(6,7)} **Olaf***	^{(7)} Karl, governor of Gothland
^{(7)} Ulfhild	^{(7)} **Frode***	^{(7)} Hather, a chief	^{(7)} **Harald***	^{(7)} Signe
^{(7)} Erik†	^{(7)} Thorhild	^{(7)} **Halfdan***† Biargramm	^{(7)} Harald
^{(7)} Asmund
Kings of Norway

Name spellings are derived from Oliver Elton's 1905 translation, The First Nine Books of the Danish History of Saxo Grammaticus, via Wikisource.

== Lay of Hyndla ==
The lay of Hyndla also mentions Arngrim and Eyfura, but only relates that they lived on Bolmsö and that they had as sons twelve ravaging berserkers named Hervard, Hjorvard, Rane, Angantyr, Bue, Brame, Barre, Reivner, Tind, Tyrving and two Haddings.

== Arngrim's sons ==
It appears that Lay of Hyndla preserves the original list.

Sons of Arngrim
Lay of Hyndla	Hervarar saga			Gesta Danorum
	version R	version U	version H	
Angantyr	Angantyr	Angantyr	Angantyr	Angantyr
Hjörvard	Hjörvard	Hjörvard	Hjörvard	Hjörvard
Hervard	Hervard	Hervard	Hervard	Hervard
Hrani	Hrani	Hrani	Hrani	Hrani
Hadding	Hadding	Hadding	Hadding	Hadding
Hadding	Hadding	Hadding	Hadding	Hadding
Barri		Barri	Barri	Barbi
Tind		Tind	Tind	Tand
Tyrfing		Tyrfing	Saeming	Tyrfing
Bui		Bui	Bui	Brand
Brami		Bild	Brami	Brodd
Reifnir		Toki	Reifnir	Hiarrande

=== Ballads ===
A medieval ballad collected in Telemark (The restless men) relates to the "sons of Arngrim" in the refrain: "Those sons of Arngrim of the north pray for homeward passage".
