= Skuld (princess) =

Semi-legendary Danish princess

Skuld (also spelled Sculd, Scullda, Skulde or Skulda) was a princess of Scandinavian legend, the sister or half-sister of the legendary Danish King Hrólfr Kraki and the wife of Hrólfr's killer, Hjörvarðr (also spelled Hiorvardus, Hiørvardus, Hevardus, Hiartuar, Hiarwat or Hartwar; and who corresponds to Heoroweard in Beowulf). In several sources, such as Hrólfs saga kraka, she is responsible for inciting her husband to overthrow the king. The accounts of her vary greatly from source to source, including the identities of her parents.

== Etymology ==
The name Skuld (which the princess shares with Skuld, one of the norns in Norse mythology) is derived from the Old Norse verb skulla, "need/ought to be/shall be"; its meaning is "that which should become, or that needs to occur".

== Attestations ==
=== Hrólfs saga kraka ===
Hrólfs saga kraka tells that one Yule, Helgi was visited by an ugly being while he was in his hunting house. No person in the entire kingdom allowed the being to enter the house, except Helgi. Later, the thing asked to sleep in his bed. Unwillingly he agreed, and as the thing got into the bed, it turned into a elvish woman, who was clad in silk and who was the most beautiful woman he had ever seen. He raped her, and made her pregnant. Helgi forgot the woman and a couple of days after the date had passed, he was visited by the woman, who had Skuld on her arms. The daughter would marry Hjörvarðr.

Much later, when her half-brother Hrólfr Kraki was King of the Danes, Skuld began to turn her husband against Hrólfr. Under the pretext that they would wait three years before paying the accumulated tribute at one time, Skuld assembled a large army which included strong warriors, criminals, elves and norns. She was a great sorceress and used seiðr (witchcraft) to hide the great muster from Hrólfr and his champions. They then arrived at Lejre one Yule for the midwinter blóts, with all the weapons hidden in wagons to ambush the king at night. A battle ensued and Bödvar Bjarki fought in the shape of a spirit bear until he was awakened by Hjalti. To overcome him, Skuld cast the most powerful spell to resuscitate her fallen warriors and after a long fight Hrólfr and eleven of his champions fell, with the sole exception of Vöggr who promises to avenge the king.

As Hjörvarðr was also killed in the battle, Skuld became the Queen of Denmark but did not rule well and only for a short time. Bödvar Bjarki's brothers Elk-Froði and Thorir (Þorir) Houndsfoot went to Denmark to avenge their brother. The Swedish queen Yrsa gave them a large Swedish army headed by Vöggr. They seized the wicked elf queen by surprise, just as she had suddenly attacked the king, tying her arms so she could not use her magic arts. With no spells to prevent it, they then slew all of her supernatural rabble. After this, a vengeance was exacted on Skuld in retribution for her treachery and fratricide, as she was tortured to death through a variety of the most dreadful ways. The rule over the kingdom was then restored to King Hrólfr's daughters. When all this was accomplished, everyone went home.

=== Skjöldunga saga ===
The Skjöldunga saga relates that Helgo was the King of Denmark together with his brother Roas. Helgo raped Olava, the Queen of the Saxons, and she bore a daughter named Yrsa. The girl later married King Adillus, the King of Sweden. Yrsa and Adillus had a daughter, Scullda. Yrsa and Adillus married their Scullda to Hiørvardus, the King of Öland. As her half-brother Rolfo (Hrólfr Kraki) was not consulted about this marriage, he was infuriated and he attacked Öland and made Hiørvardus and his kingdom tributary to Denmark. Hiørvardus and Queen Skullda rebelled against Rolfo and killed him. However, Hiørvardus did not live long after this and was himself killed.

=== Gesta Danorum ===
The Gesta Danorum tells that Roluo (Hrólfr Kraki) defeated Athislus and gave Sweden to a young man named Hiartuar (Heoroweard), who was seized by passion to Roluo's beautiful but heartless sister Skulde and married her. The ambitious Skulde, however, did not like the fact that her husband had to pay taxes to Roluo and so incited Hiartuar to rebel against him. Hiartuar went to Lejre (a town which Roluo had built) with arms hidden in the ships, under the pretense that he wanted to pay tribute. They were well-received, but after the banquet, when most people were drunk asleep, the Swedes and the Goths (i.e. the Geats) proceeded to kill everyone at Roluo's residence. After a long battle, involving Roluo's champion Bjarki, who fought in the shape of a spirit bear until he was awakened by his comrade Hjalti, the Geats won and Roluo was killed. Hiartuar asked Wigg (Vöggr) if he wanted to fight for him, and Wigg said yes. Hiartuar wanted to give Wigg a sword, but he insisted on receiving it by taking the hilt. Having the hilt in his hand, Wigg pierced Hiartuar with the sword and thus avenged Roluo. Swedes and Geats then rushed forward and killed Wigg. The Swedish king Høtherus (based on the god Höðr), the brother of Athislus, succeeded Roluo and became the king of a combined Sweden and Denmark.

The family tree of legendary Kings of the Danes, according to the Gesta Danorum (Books 1 to 9)

Kings of the Danes are marked with a crown (♕). Kings of the Swedes are marked with a dagger (†). Superscript numbers after a name indicate in which books of Gesta Danorum the individual is mentioned.

Humblus ♂ ^{(1)}
KEY
Angul ♂ ^{(1)}	♕ Dan I ♂ ^{(1)}	Grytha ♀ ^{(1)}	Marriage or coupling
Parent and child
The Angles	♕ Humblus ♂ ^{(1)}	♕ Lotherus ♂ ^{(1)}	King of the Saxons ♂ ^{(1)}	Succession by other or unclear means
Roarus ♂ ^{(1)}
Sigtrugus, King of the Swedes† ♂ ^{(1)}	♕ Skioldus ♂ ^{(1)}	Alvilda ♀ ^{(1)}
daughter of Roarus ♀ ^{(1)}	Bessus ♂ ^{(1)}
sister of Gram ♀ ^{(1)}	Gro ♀ ^{(1)}	♕ Gram† ♂ ^{(1)}	Sumblus, King of the Finns ♂ ^{(1)}
Wagnofthus ♂ ^{(1)}
Signe ♀ ^{(1)}	Henricus, King of the Saxons ♂ ^{(1)}	Haquinus, King of the Nitherians ♂ ^{(1)}
Harthgrepa ♀ ^{(1)}
♕Suibdagerus, King of Norway† ♂ ^{(1)}	sister of Guthormus ♀ ^{(1)}	♕Guthormus ♂ ^{(1)}	♕Hadingus ♂ ^{(1,2,4,5)}	Regnilda ♀ ^{(1)}
Asmundus† ♂ ^{(1)}	Gunnilda ♀ ^{(1)}	Guthormus ♂ ^{(1)}
Ulvilda ♀ ^{(1,2)}	♕ Ubbo ♂ ^{(2)}
Henricus ♂ ^{(1)}	Uffo† ♂ ^{(1)}	Hundingus† ♂ ^{(1,2)}	Thorilda ♀ ^{(2)}	Scottus ♂ ^{(2)}
daughter of Uffo ♀ ^{(1)}	Regnerus† ♂ ^{(2)}	Suanhuita ♀ ^{(2)}	sisters of Suanhuita ♀♀ ^{(2)}	Andwan, King of the Hellespont ♂ ^{(2)}
Thoraldus ♂ ^{(2)}
♕ Frotho I ♂ ^{(2,5)}	daughter of Andwan ♀ ^{(2)}
Hothbrodus† ♂ ^{(2,3)}	♕ Haldanus I ♂ ^{(2)}	Roe ♂ ^{(2)}	Skato ♂ ^{(2)}
Thora ♀ ^{(2)}
♕ Helgo ♂ ^{(2,3)}	♕ Roe ♂ ^{(2)}
Athislus† ♂ ^{(2,3)}	Ursa ♀ ^{(2)}
King Gevarus ♂ ^{(2,3)}	♕ Rolvo Krake† ♂ ^{(2,3)}	Ruta ♀ ^{(2)}	Biarco ♂ ^{(2)}	Sculda ♀ ^{(2)}	♕Hiarwarthus † ♂ ^{(2,3)}
♕ Hotherus† ♂ ^{(2,3)}	Nanna ♀ ^{(3)}	Herlecus ♂ ^{(3)}	Gericus ♂ ^{(3)}
former King of Britain ♂ ^{(3)}	mother of the King of Britain ♀ ^{(3)}	a slave ♂ ^{(3)}	a bondmaid ♀ ^{(3)}	♕ Roricus Slyngebond ♂ ^{(3)}	Gerwendillus ♂ ^{(3)}
King of Britain ♂ ^{(3,4)}	Queen of Britain ♀ ^{(3,4)}	Gerutha ♀ ^{(3,4)}	Horwendillus ♂ ^{(3,4)}	Fengo ♂ ^{(3,4)}
foster sister of Amlethus ♀ ^{(3,4)}	daughter of the King of Britain ♀ ^{(3,4)}	Amlethus ♂ ^{(3,4)}	Herminthruda, Queen of Scotland ♀ ^{(4)}	♕ Wiglecus ♂ ^{(4)}
son of Amlethus ♂ ^{(4)}	♕Wermundus ♂ ^{(4)}	Frowinus, governor of Sleswik ♂ ^{(4)}
♕ Uffo, or Olavus the Gentle ♂ ^{(4)}	daughter of Frowin ♀ ^{(4)}	Keto ♂ ^{(4)}	Wigo ♂ ^{(4)}
♕ Dan II ♂ ^{(4)}
♕ Huglecus ♂ ^{(4)}
♕ Frotho II, the Vigorous ♂ ^{(4)}
♕ Dan III ♂ ^{(4)}
Craca ♀ ^{(5)}	Regnerus ♂ ^{(5)}	Bracus ♂ ^{(5)}	♕ Fridlevus I, the Swift ♂ ^{(4,5)}	Hun, King of the Huns ♂ ^{(5)}	Hun ♂ ^{(5)}
Gøtarus, King of Norway ♂ ^{(5)}	Westmarus ♂ ^{(5)}	Colo ♂ ^{(5)}	Gøtwara ♀ ^{(5)}
Rollerus ♂ ^{(5)}	Ericus the Shrewd-spoken† ♂ ^{(5,6)}	Gunwara the Fair ♀ ^{(5)}	Alvilda ♀ ^{(5)}	♕ Frotho III ♂ ^{(5,6)}	Hanunda ♀ ^{(5)}	Grep (eldest of three) ♂ ^{(5)}	11 other sons (two named Grep) ♂♂ ^{(5)}
Hythin, King of Tellemark ♂ ^{(6)}	Alvo ♂ ^{(5)}	Ofura ♀ ^{(5)}	Arngrimus ♂ ^{(5)}	Grubbus ♂ ^{(6)}	♕ Hiarnus ♂ ^{(6)}	Amundus, King of Norway ♂ ^{(6)}
child of Hythin ^{(6)}	Haldanus† ♂ ^{(6)}	12 sons, including Angantir ♂♂ ^{(5)}	Ano ♂ ^{(6)}	Iuritha ♀ ^{(6)}	♕ Fridlevus II ♂ ^{(6)}	Frogertha ♀ ^{(6)}
Hanevus, King of Saxony ♂ ^{(6)}	Suertingus, King of Saxony ♂ ^{(6)}	Olavus ♂ ^{(6)}	♕ Frotho IV ♂ ^{(6)}
Sywardus† ♂ ^{(6,7)}	sons of Suertingus ♂♂ ^{(6)}	sister of the sons of Suertingus ♀ ^{(6)}	♕ Ingellus ♂ ^{(6,7)}	Helga ♀ ^{(6)}	Helgo ♂ ^{(6)}	Asa ♀ ^{(6)}
three sons that died in war ♂♂ ^{(7)}	♕ Olavus I ♂ ^{(7)}	Karolus, governor of Gothland ♂ ^{(7)}
Ulvilda ♀ ^{(7)}	♕ Frotho V ♂ ^{(7)}	Hatherus ♂ ^{(7)}	♕ Haraldus I ♂ ^{(7)}	Sygne ♀ ^{(7)}
Ericus† ♂ ^{(7)}	Thorhilda ♀ ^{(7)}	♕ Haldanus II Biargrammus† ♂ ^{(7)}	♕Haraldus II ♂ ^{(7)}
Ebbo ♂ ^{(7)}	mother of Otharus ♀ ^{(7)}	♕ Unguinus, King of the Goths ♂ ^{(7)}	Asmundus ♂ ^{(7)}
sister of Otharus ♀ ^{(7)}	♕ Sywaldus I ♂ ^{(7)}	Sygrutha ♀ ^{(7)}	Kings of Norway
Sywardus, King of the Goths ♂ ^{(7)}	mother of Alvilda ♀ ^{(7)}	Otharus ♂ ^{(7)}	Syritha ♀ ^{(7)}	♕ Sygarus ♂ ^{(7)}	queen of Sygarus ♀ ^{(7)}	Hamundus, a petty king ♂ ^{(7)}
Wemundus ♂ ^{(7)}	Ostenus ♂ ^{(7)}	♕Sywaldus II ♂ ^{(7)}	Algerus ♂ ^{(7)}	Helwin ♂ ^{(7)}	Hamundus ♂ ^{(7)}
Regnaldus, King of the Northmen ♂ ^{(7)}	Alvilda ♀ ^{(7)}	Alf ♂ ^{(7)}	Sygne ♂ ^{(7)}	Hagbarthus ♂ ^{(7)}	Hako ♂ ^{(7)}
Gro ♀ ^{(7)}	Borcarus ♂ ^{(7)}	Drota ♀ ^{(7)}	Gunnarus ♂ ^{(7)}	Hano, ruler of Funen ♂ ^{(7)}	Ostmarus, ruler of Scania ♂ ^{(7)}	Hundingus, ruler of Zealand ♂ ^{(7)}	Roricus, co-ruler of Jutland ♂ ^{(7)}	Hatherus, co-ruler of Jutland ♂ ^{(7)}
Haraldus ♂ ^{(7)}	Hildigerus ♂ ^{(7)}	Røtho, a Ruthenian pirate ♂ ^{(7)}	Wesetus ♂
♕Haldanus III ♂ ^{(7)}	Guritha ♀ ^{(7)}
Alverus† ♂ ^{(7,8)}	♕ Haraldus III Hyldetan ♂ ^{(7)}
Olavus ♂ ^{(7)}	Ingo ♂ ^{(7)}	Ingeldus† ♂ ^{(7)}	sister of Haraldus ♀ ^{(7)}	Ubbo ♂ ^{(7)}	sister of Haraldus ♀ ^{(7)}	Sywardus ♂ ^{(7)}	sister of Haraldus ♀ ^{(7)}	Olavus, king of the Werms ♂ ^{(7)}
♕ Ringo I† ♂ ^{(7,8)}	♕ Hetha ♀ ^{(8)}	♕ Olo the Vigorous ♂ ^{(7,8)}	Esa ♀ ^{(7)}	son of the king ♂ ^{(7,8)}
Atylo the Scanian ♂ ^{(8)}	Ringo, ruler of Norway ♂ ^{(8)}
Tola ♂ ^{(8)}	Omothus, or Homothus ♂ ^{(8)}	daughter of Ringo ♀ ^{(8)}	Esa ♀ ^{(8)}	♕ Omundus ♂ ^{(7,8)}
Sibbo ♂ ^{(8)}	sister of Gøtarus ♀ ^{(8)}	Gøtarus† ♂ ^{(8)}	daughter of Omundus ♀ ^{(8)}	♕ Sywardus I ♂ ^{(8)}	♕ Buthlus ♂ ^{(8)}	daughter of Omundus ♀ ^{(8)}
Ebbo ♂ ^{(8)}
early wife of Iarmericus ♀ ^{(8)}	♕Iarmericus † ♂ ^{(8)}	Suanilda ♀ ^{(8)}	the Hellepontines, 4 brothers ♂♂ ^{(8)}	Iarmericus' sister, sold to Norwegians ♀ ^{(8)}	Iarmericus' sister, sold to Germans ♀ ^{(8)}
♕ Broderus ♂ ^{(8)}	nephews of Iarmericus ♂♂ ^{(8)}
King of the Goths ♂ ^{(8)}	♕ Sywaldus III ♂ ^{(8)}
King of Sweden† ♂ ^{(8)}	daughter of the King of the Goths ♀ ^{(8)}	♕ Snio ♂ ^{(8)}
♕ Biorn ♂ ^{(8)}
♕ Haraldus III ♂ ^{(8)}
a queen from Sweden ♀ ^{(8)}	♕ Gormo I ♂ ^{(8)}
♕ Gotricus, or Godefridus ♂ ^{(8,9)}
♕ Olavus III ♂ ^{(9)}	daughter of Gotricus ♀ ^{(9)}	Sywardus, King of Norway ♂ ^{(9)}	unknown
♕Hemmingus ♂ ^{(9)}	♕Siwardus II Ring ♂ ^{(9)}	♕ Ringo II ♂ ^{(9)}	Herothus† ♂ ^{(9)}	Hesbernus ♂ ^{(9)}
ruler in Norway ♂ ^{(9)}	Lathgertha ♀ ^{(9)}	♕Regnerus Lothbrog ♂ ^{(9)}	Thora ♀ ^{(9)}
Suanlogha ♀ ^{(9)}	a woman ♀ ^{(9)}
2 daughters ♀♀ ^{(9)}	Fridlevus ♂ ^{(9)}	♕ Haraldus ♂ ^{(9)}	♕ Siwardus & Ericus ♂♂ ^{(9)}	Rathbarthus ♂ ^{(9)}	Dunwatus ♂ ^{(9)}	Ubbo ♂ ^{(9)}
Regnaldus ♂ ^{(9)}	Withsercus ♂ ^{(9)}	Ericus Wind-hat ♂ ^{(9)}	Guthormus ♂ ^{(9)}	♕ Ericus I ♂ ^{(9)}	♕ Sywardus Snake-Eye ♂ ^{(9)}	Biornus ♂ ^{(9)}	Agnerus ♂ ^{(9)}	Ivarus ♂ ^{(9)}
daughter of Guthormus ♀ ^{(9)}	♕ Ericus II ♂ ^{(9)}
♕ Kanutus I ♂ ^{(9)}
♕ Frotho VI ♂ ^{(9)}
♕ Gormo II the English ♂ ^{(9)}
♕ Haraldus V ♂ ^{(9)}	Hedelradus, King of England ♂ ^{(9)}
♕ Gormo III ♂ ^{(9)}	Thira ♀ ^{(9)}
Kanutus ♂ ^{(9)}	Haraldus VI ♂ ^{(9)}

Genealogical information is derived from Oliver Elton's 1905 translation, The First Nine Books of the Danish History of Saxo Grammaticus (via Wikisource). Name spellings are from the 1931 Latin critical edition by Olrik and Ræder (via Wikisource). Regnal numbers, which do not appear in the original text, are included for clarity and taken from the engraving Veræ effigies regum omnium by Erico Olai Tormio.

=== Chronicon Lethrense ===
In the Chronicon Lethrense, Sculd is the daughter of King Athisl and Ursula. Her half-brother, King Rolf Kraki, with brotherly affection gave her a province and built the village for her that is now called Skuldelev. Rolf refused to let her marry Hiarwart, a Teutonic count of Skåne, but she eloped with Hiarwart regardless and afterwards conspired with him to kill Rolf and have Hiarwart become the new king. Hiarwart arrived in Zealand with a large army, and said that he wanted to give his tribute to Rolf, but instead his soldiers surrounded Rolf and killed him. He was king from dawn until "primam", when he was killed by Haki (brother of Haghbard, son of Hamund), who became king in his place. The fate of Sculd is not mentioned.

The family tree of legendary Kings of the Danes, according to Chronicon Lethrense

Kings of the Danes are marked with a crown (♕).

Ypper, King of Uppsala ♂
KEY
Nori ♂	Østen ♂	♕ Dan ♂	Dannia ♀	Marriage or coupling
Parent and child
Rolfcarl, aka Rolf, a baron ♂	♕ Ro ♂	Ro's wife ♀	Succession by other means
Thora ♀
♕ Helgi ♂	♕ Haldan ♂
Athisl, King of Swethia ♂	Ursula ♀	♕ Raka, a dog ♂
Siward Albus ♂	♕ Snyo ♂
♕ Hiarwart ♂	Sculd ♀	♕ Rolf Kraki ♂
Hamund ♂
♕ Aki ♂	Haghbard ♂	daughter of Rolf Kraki ♀	♕ Fritleff ♂
♕ Frothi Largus ♂
♕ Ingyald ♂
♕ Olav ♂
♕ Asa ♀
♕ Harald Hildetan (war-tooth) ♂
♕ Hethae ♀

The source used for the genealogical information and name spellings is the English translation provided by Mischa Hooker of Augustana College.

=== Gesta Danorum på danskæ ===
In the Gesta Danorum på danskæ tells that Rolf Krage's sister Skulda was married against Rolf's will to Hartwar, a German count of Skåne, but reputedly Rolf had given Skulda to him together with Sweden. Hartwar arrived in Zealand with a large army and said that he wanted to give his tribute to Rolf, but instead killed Rolf together with all his men except for one, who was named Wigge, who played along until he was to do homage to Hartwar. Then, he pierced Hartwar with a sword, and so Hartwar was only king one morning. However, according to a reputation, it was instead an Ake, Hauborth's brother, who killed Hartwar and so became king.

The family tree of legendary Kings of the Danes, according to Gesta Danorum på danskæ (extract)

Kings of the Danes are marked with a crown (♕).

♕ Halfdan ♂	Ro ♂	Skat ♂	KEY
Marriage or coupling
♕ Ro or Halfdan ♂	♕ Helghe ♂	Thore ♀	Parent and child
Succession by other means
♕ A dog king ♂	Yrse ♀
♕ Snio ♂	♕ Rolf Krage ♂	Skulda ♀	♕ Hartwar ♂
Hodbrod ♂	Hadding's daughter ♀
♕ Hother ♂
♕ Rorik Slengeborre, also called Rake ♂	Rorik's sister ♀	Orwendel ♂	Feng ♂
King of Britain's daughter ♀	Amblothe ♂	Queen of Scotland ♀
♕ Wighlek ♂	Nanna ♀
♕ Wermund ♂
♕ Offe the Strong ♂

The source used for the genealogical information and name spellings is the English translation provided by Peter Tunstall.
