= Hjörvard =

Hjörvard was the name of several characters in Norse mythology.

1. Hjörvard Ylfing, see Granmar.
2. Hjörvard, who rebelled against Hrólf Kraki and killed him, see Heoroweard
3. Hjörvard, the son of Arngrim.
4. Hervor's name as a shieldmaiden.
