= Skjöldr =

King of the Danes

King of the Danes
- Predecessor: Odin
- Successor: Gram
- Consort: Alfhild
- Issue: Gram
- House: Scylding
- Father: Odin
- Religion: Germanic paganism

Skjöldr (Old Norse Skjǫldr, Icelandic Skjöldur, sometimes Anglicized as Skjold or Skiold, Latinized as Skioldus; Old English Scyld, Proto-Germanic *Skelduz ‘shield’) was among the first legendary Danish kings. He is mentioned in the Prose Edda, in Ynglinga saga, in Chronicon Lethrense, in Sven Aggesen's history, in Arngrímur Jónsson's Latin abstract of the lost Skjöldunga saga and in Saxo Grammaticus' Gesta Danorum. He also appears in the Old English poem Beowulf. The various accounts have little in common.

== Primary sources ==
=== Beowulf ===
Skjǫldr appears in the prologue of Beowulf, where he is referred to as Scyld Scefing, implying he is a descendant or son of a Scef (‘Sheaf’, usually identified with Sceafa), or, literally, 'of the sheaf'. According to Beowulf he was found in a boat as a child, possibly an orphan, but grew on to become a powerful warrior and king:

Scyld the Sheaf-Child from scourging foemen,
From raiders a-many their mead-halls wrested.
He lives to be feared, the first has a waif,
Puny and frail he was found on the shore.
He grew to be great, and was girt with power
Till the border-tribes all obeyed his rule,
And sea-folk hardy that sit by the whale-path
Gave him tribute, a good king was he.

After relating in general terms the glories of Scyld's reign, the poet describes Scyld's funeral, his body was laid in a ship surrounded by treasures:

They decked his body no less bountifully
with offerings than those first ones did
who cast him away when he was a child
and launched him alone out over the waves.

In line 33 of Beowulf, Scyld's ship is called īsig, literally, ‘icy.’ The meaning of this epithet has been discussed many times. Anatoly Liberman gives a full survey of the literature and suggests that the word meant "shining."

William of Malmesbury's 12th century Chronicle tells the story of Sceafa as a sleeping child in a boat without oars with a sheaf of corn at his head.

Olrik (1910) suggested Peko, a parallel "barley-figure" in Finnish, in turn connected by Fulk (1989) with Eddaic Bergelmir.

Family tree of the Scyldings (Kings of the Danes), Heathobards and Scylfings (Kings of the Swedes), according to Beowulf

♕ Heremod
♕ Scyld Scefing
♕ Beowulf
♕ Healfdene	♕ Ongentheow
♕ Heorogar	♕ Hrothgar	Wealhtheow	Halga	A daughter	♕ Onela	♕ Ohthere
Heoroweard	Hrethric	Hrothmund	Hrothulf	Froda	Eanmund	Eadgils
Freawaru	Ingeld

=== Scandinavian ===
==== Legendary sagas ====
In the Ynglinga saga and in the now-lost Skjöldunga saga, Odin came from Asia (Scythia) and conquered Northern Europe. He gave Sweden to his son Yngvi and Denmark to his son Skjöldr. Since then the kings of Sweden were called Ynglings and those of Denmark Skjöldungs.

==== Gesta Danorum ====
In Gesta Danorum, Skioldus is the son of Lotherus, a wicked king who met his end in an insurrection.

The family tree of legendary Kings of the Danes, according to the Gesta Danorum (Books I to VII)

Kings of the Danes are in bold and marked with a crown (♕). Kings of the Swedes are marked with a dagger (†). Superscript numbers before a name indicate in which books of Gesta Danorum the individual is mentioned.

^{(1)} Humble
KEY
^{(1)} Angul	^{(1)} **Dan** ♕	^{(1)} Grytha	Marriage or coupling
Parent and child
The Angles	^{(1)} **Humble** ♕	^{(1)} **Lother** ♕	^{(1)} King of the Saxons	Succession by other or unclear means
^{(1)} Roar
^{(1)} Sigtryg, King of the Swedes†	^{(1)} **Skiold** ♕	^{(1)} Alfhild
^{(1)} daughter of Roar	^{(1)} Bess
^{(1)} sister of Gram	^{(1)} Gróa	^{(1)} **Gram** ♕†	^{(1)} Sumble, King of the Finns
^{(1)} Wagnhofde
^{(1)} Signe	^{(1)} Henry, King of the Saxons	^{(1)} Hakon, King of the Nitherians
^{(1)} Hardgrep
^{(1)} **Swipdag** ♕†, King of Norway	^{(1)} sister of Guthorm	^{(1)} **Guthorm** ♕	^{(1,2,5)} **Hadding** ♕	^{(1)} Ragnhild
^{(1)} Asmund†	^{(1)} Gunnhild	^{(1)} Guthorm
^{(1,2)} Ulfhild	^{(2)} **Ubbe** ♕
^{(1)} Henry	^{(1)} Uffe†	^{(1,2)} Hunding†	^{(2)} Thorhild	^{(2)} Scot
^{(1)} daughter of Uffe	^{(2)} Ragnar†	^{(2)} Swanhwid	^{(2)} sisters of Swanhwid	^{(2)} Handwan
^{(2)} Thorwald
^{(2,5)} **Frode** ♕	^{(2)} daughter of Handwan
^{(2,3)} Hothbrodd†	^{(2)} **Halfdan** ♕	^{(2)} Ro	^{(2)} Skat
^{(2)} Thora
^{(2,3)} **Helge** ♕	^{(2)} **Ro** ♕
^{(2,3)} Athisl†	^{(2)} Urse
^{(2,3)} King Gewar	^{(2,3)} **Rolf** Krage ♕†	^{(2)} Rute	^{(2)} Bjarke	^{(2)} Skulde	^{(2,3)} **Hiartuar** †♕
^{(2,3)} **Hother** †♕	^{(3)} Nanna	^{(3)} Herlek	^{(3)} Gerit
^{(3)} former King of Britain	^{(3)} mother of the King of Britain	^{(3)} a slave	^{(3)} a bondmaid	^{(3)} **Rorik** Slyngebond ♕	^{(3)} Gerwendil
^{(3,4)} King of Britain	^{(3,4)} Queen of Britain	^{(3,4)} Gerutha	^{(3,4)} Horwendil	^{(3,4)} Feng
^{(3,4)} foster sister of Amleth	^{(3,4)} daughter of the King of Britain	^{(3,4)} Amleth	^{(4)} Hermutrude, Queen of Scotland	^{(4)} **Wiglek** ♕
^{(4)} son of Amleth	^{(4)} **Wermund** ♕	^{(4)} Frowin, governor of Sleswik
^{(4)} **Uffe** ♕, aka Olaf the Gentle	^{(4)} daughter of Frowin	^{(4)} Ket	^{(4)} Wig
^{(4)} **Dan** ♕
^{(4)} **Hugleik** ♕
^{(4)} **Frode** the Vigorous ♕
^{(4)} **Dan** ♕
^{(5)} Kraka	^{(5)} Ragnar	^{(5)} Brak	^{(4,5)} **Fridleif** the Swift ♕	^{(5)} Hun, King of the Huns	^{(5)} Hun
^{(5)} Gotar, King of Norway	^{(5)} Westmar	^{(5)} Koll	^{(5)} Gotwar
^{(5)} Roller	^{(5,6)} Erik† Shrewd-spoken	^{(5)} Gunwar the Fair	^{(5)} Alfhild	^{(5,6)} **Frode** ♕	^{(5)} Hanund	^{(5)} Grep (eldest of three)	^{(5)} 11 other sons (two named Grep)
^{(6)} Hythin, King of Tellemark	^{(5)} Alf	^{(5)} Eyfura	^{(5)} Arngrim	^{(6)} Grubb	^{(6)} **Hiarn** ♕	^{(6)} Amund, King of Norway
^{(6)} child of Hythin	^{(6)} Halfdan†	^{(5)} 12 sons, including Anganty	^{(6)} Ane	^{(6)} Juritha	^{(6)} **Fridleif** ♕	^{(6)} Frogertha
^{(6)} Hanef, King of Saxony	^{(6)} Swerting, King of Saxony	^{(6)} Olaf	^{(6)} **Frode** ♕
^{(6,7)} Siward†	^{(6)} sons of Swerting	^{(6)} sister of the sons of Swerting	^{(6,7)} **Ingild** ♕	^{(6)} Helga	^{(6)} Helge	^{(6)} Asa
^{(6,7)} Frode	^{(6,7)} Fridleif	^{(6,7)} Ingild	^{(6,7)} **Olaf** ♕	^{(7)} Karl, governor of Gothland
^{(7)} Ulfhild	^{(7)} **Frode** ♕	^{(7)} Hather, a chief	^{(7)} **Harald** ♕	^{(7)} Signe
^{(7)} Erik†	^{(7)} Thorhild	^{(7)} **Halfdan** Biargramm ♕†	^{(7)} Harald
^{(7)} Asmund
Kings of Norway

Name spellings are derived from Oliver Elton's 1905 translation, The First Nine Books of the Danish History of Saxo Grammaticus, via Wikisource.

==== Sven Aggesen's history ====
In Sven Aggesen's Brevis historia regum Dacie, Skiold is described as the first man to rule the Danes. He was known by that name because of the shielding power of his kingship.

The family tree of legendary Kings of the Danes, according to Brevis historia regum Dacie by Sven Aggesen

Kings of the Danes are marked with a crown (♕).

♕ Skiold
KEY
Frothi	♕ Halfdan	Marriage or coupling
Parent and child
♕ Helghi	Inheritance by other or unclear means
♕ Rolf Kraki
♕ Rokil Slagenback
♕ Frothi the Bold
♕ Wermund
♕ Uffi
♕ Dan the High-minded, or the Proud
♕ Frothi the Old
♕ Frithlefer
♕ Frothi Frithgothæ, or the Magnificent
♕ Ingiald
♕ Olaf	Regner Lothbrogh
daughter	♕ Sighwarth
♕ Knut (first of that name in Denmark)
♕ Snio
♕ Klak-Harald
♕ Gorm Løghæ	Thyrwi, the Ornament of the Realm
historical kings of Denmark

The source used for the genealogical information and name spellings is the English translation by Eric Christiansen.

=== Beowulf and Tolkien's legendarium ===
The passage at the start of the Old English poem Beowulf about Scyld Scefing contains a cryptic mention of þā ("those") who have sent Scyld as a baby in a boat, presumably from across the sea, and to whom Scyld's body is returned in a ship funeral, the vessel sailing by itself. Shippey suggests that J. R. R. Tolkien may have seen in this several elements of his legendarium: a Valar-like group who behave much like gods; a glimmer of his Old Straight Road, the way across the sea to the earthly paradise of Valinor forever closed to mortal Men by the remaking of the world after Númenor's attack on Valinor; and Valinor itself.

Legendary titles
Preceded by Lother	King of the Danes	Succeeded by Gram
