= Hjalte =

Hjalte is a Danish masculine given name.

Notable people with the name Hjalte include:

- Hjalte Bidstrup (born 2006), Danish footballer
- Hjalte Boe (born 2007), Danish footballer
- Hjalte Froholdt (born 1996), Danish American football player
- Hjalte Nørregaard (born 1981), Danish footballer
- Hjalte Rasmussen (1940–2012), Law professor
- Hjalte Thygesen, a member of the band Grand Avenue
- Hjalte Toftegaard (born 2006), Danish footballer

== See also ==
- Hjalti
