= Elgfróði =

Figure in Germanic heroic legend

Elgfróði (literally "Elk-Fróði"; sometimes anglicised as "Elgfrothi"), is the half-man, half-elk elder brother of the hero Bödvar Bjarki and Thorir Houndsfoot in Germanic heroic legend. His name is also used as an alternative term for centaurs, although it is not clear if he was originally thought of as having two or four legs.

== Name ==
Elgfróði translates as "Elk-Fróði", in which "Fróði" is a personal name. In addition to this translation or the name being presented in its Old Norse spelling, it is also sometimes presented in an anglicised form, such as "Elgfrothi".

== Attestations ==
=== Hrólfr Kraki's saga ===
In Hrólfs saga kraka, the sole surviving medieval source referencing Elgfróði, he is the son of Bjorn ("bear"), the son of King Hring of Oppland, and Bera ("female bear"), a churl's daughter and Bjorn's childhood friend. It tells that Bjorn refused the advances of his stepmother, the queen, while the king was away and struck her, telling her to leave him. In retaliation, the queen cursed Bjorn to take the form of a bear by day whereupon he fled to a cave and proceeded to hunt the king's cattle. Taking advantage of this, the queen encourages King Hring to send men to kill the bear. One evening Bera sees the bear who walks up to her and through looking into its eyes realises it is Bjorn. She follows Bjorn back to his cave where he returns to his human form and makes her pregnant. Bjorn foresees that he will be killed by the king's men the next day and that the queen will try to feed Bera his flesh but insists that she does not eat it. He further tells Bera that when the time comes for each of their children to leave home, they should go to the cave where they will find three weapons stuck in a rock, only one of which they will be able to remove. After this, Bjorn transforms back into a bear and leaves the cave where he is cornered by the king's men and slain. Later, a feast is held where the bear meat is boiled and the queen offers it to Bera to eat, who refuses. Claiming her hospitality is being insulted, the queen forces Bera to eat her lover's flesh, who lets a tiny piece of meat fall into her mouth. Because of this, her three children are born as follows:

Old Norse text
Mills translation
Crawford translation

Þat var maðr upp, en elgr niðr frá nafla. Hann er nefndr Elg-Fróði. Annarr sveinn kemr þar til ok er kallaðr Þórir. Hundsfætr váru á honum frá rist ok því var hann kallaðr Þórir hundsfótr. Hann var maðr fríðastr sýnum fyrir annat. Inn þriði sveinn kom til, ok var sá allra vænstr. Sá er kallaðr Böðvarr, ok var honum ekki neitt til lýta.

He was a man above, and an elk below the navel; he was named Elgfrothi. A second son was born named Thorir, and he had hound's feet down from his instep, and was therefore called Thorir Houndsfoot. He was of fairest appearance in every other aspect. The third son was born and he was the most promising; he was named Bothvar and had no blemish.

He was a human in his top half, though he was a moose from the navel down. He was named Moose-Fróđi. (Note: This translation is written in American English and thus uses the term "moose" to refer to the animal known in British English as "elk" or Old Norse as "elg") Another boy was born, and he was called Thórir Dog-foot because of this. He was the handsomest of men in every other respect. The third boy was born, and he was the handsomest of all three. He was named Bođvar, and there was no fault in his appearance.

As a child, Elgfróði was incredibly fierce, hurting many of the king's men and killing one. By the time he was twelve he was stronger than all others and he was not permitted to join in their games. At this, Elgfróði told his mother he wished to leave, claiming that he cannot live among men any longer given that they are injured by him only touching them. Bera agrees that he should not be part of society on account of his violence and led him to the cave in which Bjorn had lived. Elgfroði had been left the least by his father and desired more but was not allowed, and tried to take the weapons embedded in the rock. Neither the longsword, nor the axe would release from the stone, whereupon he tried the third weapon and the shortsword slid out. In anger at it being the worst weapon, he tried to break it on a rock but instead, it was buried into the rock up to the haft. Taking his sword with him, he left the cave and built a hut at a mountain pass, killing and stealing from travelers attempting to pass through.

Soon after, Thorir Houndsfoot leaves his mother's home and collecting his gifts from Bjorn's cave, goes to visit Elgfróði, covering his face with a hood. Thinking him a stranger, Elgfróði threatens Thorir, burying his sword into a beam before realising his true identity and offering him half of the wealth he has accrued from his banditry, though Thorir refuses. Elgfróði then leads him to the land of the Geats, where Thorir becomes king.

When it is the turn of Bödvar Bjarki to leave home, he too collects the gifts left for him by his father and goes to visit Elgfróði concealed by a hood. As with Thorir, Elgfróði threatens the visitor and buries his sword into a beam, and not recognising his brother, challenges him to fight. As they wrestle, Bödvar Bjarki's hood falls down and Elgfróði recognises him and they cease the brawl. Elgfróði offers his brother half of his possessions, as he did with Thorir Houndsfoot, but again is refused on account of their provenance. He sets Bödvar Bjarki on his way, recommending him to seek out Hrolf Kraki and join his company. As he's leaving, Elgfróði gives his brother a push and tells Bödvar Bjarki that he is not as strong as is fitting for him. At this, he cuts into his calf, letting blood drip out and told Bödvar Bjarki to drink. Once he had, Elgfróði pushes his brother again, this time observing that the strength of his blood made Bödvar Bjarki stand firm. Elgfróði then stamps on a rock beside him such that his hoof is buried deep in it, saying:

Old Norse text
Mills translation
Crawford translation

"Til þessa spors mun ek koma hvern dag ok vita, hvat í sporinu er; mold mun verða, ef þú verðr sóttdauðr, vatn, ef þú verðr sjódauðr, blóð, ef þú verðr vápndauðr, ok mun ek þá hefna þín, því at ek ann þér mest allra minna."

"To this hoof-print will I come every day and look what is therein; earth will be in it if thou be dead from sickness; water of thou art drowned in the sea; and blood, if thou art dead from weapons; and in that case I will avenge thee, for I love thee best of all men."

"I will come every day to this hoofprint and see what is in it. There will be earth, if you die in sickness, water if you die at sea, and blood if you die in combat, and I will avenge you because I love you the most of all men."

At the end of the story, Bödvar Bjarki is slain along with Hrolf Kraki by the army of the sorceress Skuld. Elgfróði avenges his brother as he promised, taking Skuld by surprise and killing her, with the help of Thorir Houndsfoot and Queen Yrsa's army, led by Vöggr.

=== Elg-Fróða þáttr ===
Elg-Fróða þáttr ("The Tale of Elgfróði") is referenced in Hrólfs saga kraka as describing how the eponymous hero took vengeance on Skuld for killing his brother, Bödvar Bjarki, however this source is now lost.

== Themes ==
Bödvar Bjarki drinking Elgfróði's blood to gain strength has been identified as a motif in Germanic heroic legend in which drinking of a monster's blood grants transformative powers, such as is seen in the Völsung Cycle when eating the heart of the worm Fáfnir grants Sigurð understanding of the speech of birds.

== In popular culture ==
Elgfrothi is the name of an Icelandic electronic music artist.

== See also ==
- Fróði
- Lists of figures in Germanic heroic legend

== Notes ==
=== Primary ===
- Byock, Jesse L. (1990). Saga of the Volsungs: The Norse Epic of Sigurd the Dragon Slayer. Berkeley, Los Angeles, London: University of California Press. ISBN 0-520-23285-2.
- Crawford, Jackson (2021). Two sagas of mythical heroes : Hervor and Heidrek & Hrólf Kraki and his champions, Glossary for The Saga of Hrólf Kraki and His Champions. Indianapolis, Indiana: Hackett. pp. 141–156. ISBN 9781624669941.
- Mills, Stella (1933). Saga of Hrolf Kraki.
- "Hrólfs saga kraka ok kappa hans – heimskringla.no". www.heimskringla.no.

=== Secondary ===
- Hui, Jonathan (2018). "Bad Beef and Mad Cow Disease in Bósa saga ok Herrauðs". Scandinavian Studies. 90 (4): 461–484. doi:10.5406/scanstud.90.4.0461.
- Matveeva, Elizaveta (2015). Reconsidering the tradition: The Odinic hero as saga protagonist. University of Nottingham.
- Olson, Oscar Ludvig (1916). "The Relation of the Hrólfs Saga Kraka and the Bjarkarímur to Beowulf". Publications of the Society for the Advancement of Scandinavian Study. 3 (1): 1–104. ISSN 1544-2071.
- Zoëga, Geir T. (1910). A Concise Dictionary of Old Icelandic. Oxford University Press.
- The Nordic languages : an international handbook of the history of the North Germanic languages. Berlin: W. de Gruyter. 2002. ISBN 3110148765.
- "Elgfrothi". Beatport.
