= Heoroweard =

Figure in Germanic legend

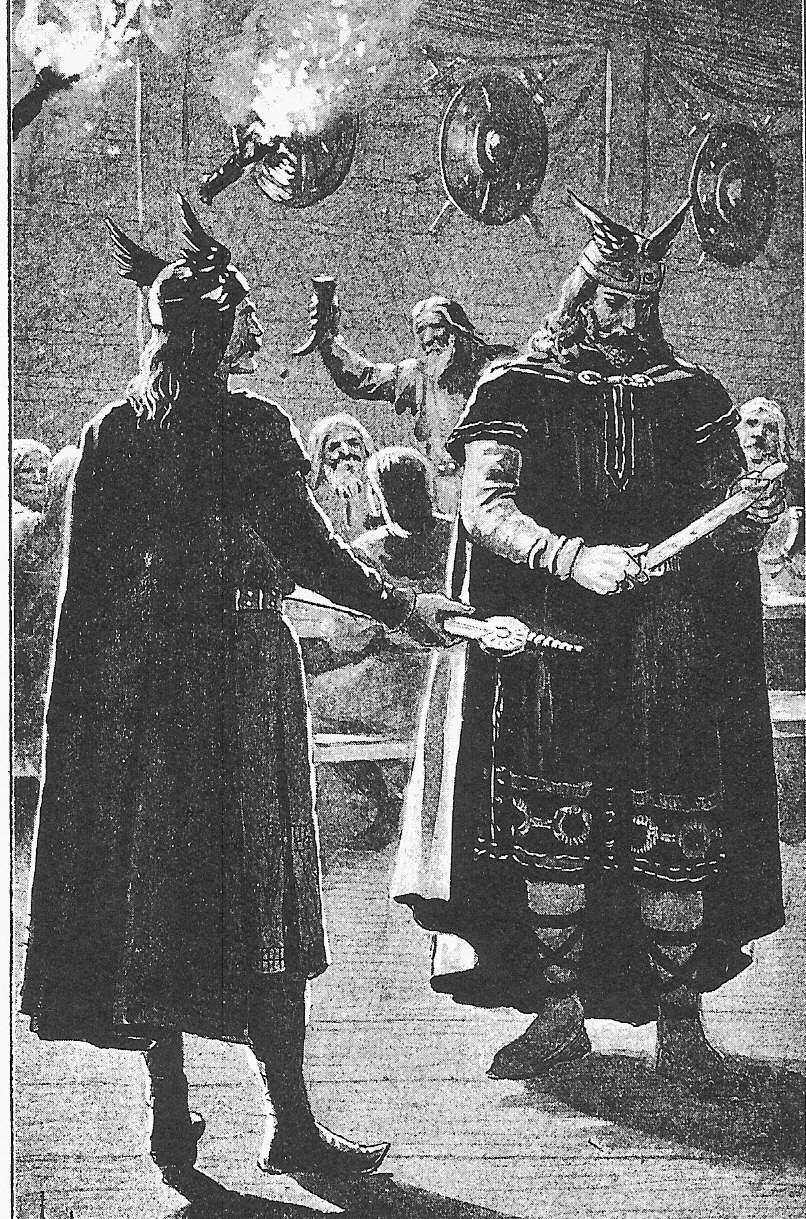
Hjörvarðr (Heoroweard) and Hrólfr Kraki (Hroðulf), by Jenny Nyström (1895).

Heoroweard is a character who appears in Beowulf and also in Norse legends, where he is named Hjörvarðr or Hiartuar. If he existed in real life, his name would have been Proto-Norse *Heruwarduz.

In the Norse sources, Hereoweard rebelled against Hroðulf/Hrólf Kraki and killed him, but otherwise the sources vary greatly. This is an account of the differences:

In the paraphrase of Bjarkamál in the Gesta Danorum of Saxo Grammaticus, his army consisted of Swedes in one line and of Geats in another line. This information does not appear in any other sources.

Several sources mention that he was married to Skuld, who according to Angrim's summary of the lost Skjöldunga saga was the daughter of Aðils the Swedish king (called Eadgils in Beowulf). However, according to the Chronicon Lethrense and Hrólf Kraki's saga, she was the daughter of Helgi (Halga), whereas Saxo is vague whether it was Adils or Helgi who was her father.

Hrólf Kraki's saga does not mention where he came from, but according to Arngrímur Jónsson, Heoroweard was the king of Öland and according to Saxo, he became Hrólf's jarl in Sweden, whereas in the Chronicon Lethrense, he was German and the jarl of Skåne.

In Beowulf, he is the son of Heorogar, the elder brother of Halga (Helgi) and Hroðgar (Hróar). (Consequently, he had greater right to the Danish throne than Hrólf Kraki (Hroðulf), and it is not surprising that he was the one who slew Hrólf.) He is mentioned only once, at lines 2160-2161. Beowulf, in the act of giving to his lord Hygelac the armor of Heorogar (which Hrothgar had given to Beowulf as a reward), repeats what Hrothgar told him: "No sooner would Heorogar give it to his son, valiant Heoroweard, though he was true to him..."

He did not survive long after Hrólfs death. According to Arngrímur Jónsson's epitome of Skjöldunga saga, Hrólf Kraki's saga and the Chronicon Lethrense, he was killed shortly after. According to Hrólf Kraki's saga, he was killed during the battle, and according to the other sources, he became king but was killed the same day.

== Succession ==
Hrólf Kraki Tradition

Hrólf Kraki's saga
Ynglinga saga
Lejre Chronicle
Gesta Danorum
Beowulf
People
Hrólfr Kraki
Halfdan
Helgi
Yrsa
Adils
Áli
Bödvar Bjarki
Hjörvard
Roar
Locations
Lejre
Uppsala
Fyrisvellir

According to Arngrímur, Hereoweard was succeeded by Rörek (called Hreðric in Beowulf), Hrólf's cousin, but he was attacked by Valdar. They shared the kingdom so that Rörek kept Zealand, whereas Valdar took Skåne. This version does not fit Bjarkimal as it relates that Rörik had been killed by Hrólf.

According to Hrólf Kraki's saga, Skuld inherited the kingdom but was killed by the Geatish king Thorir Houndsfoot and by Yrsa's men. The kingdom then passed into the hands of Hrólf's daughters.

According to Saxo, it is Höðr, Aðils' brother who became the king of both Denmark and Sweden.

In the Chronicon Lethrense, it is Haki, son of Hamund, who became the king of Denmark, but the other sources who mention him place him centuries earlier.

== Comments ==
The Danish scholar Axel Olrik (1903) has proposed a solution to why the sources vary. According to Beowulf, Adils gains the Swedish throne aided by the Geats. In Heoroweard's case, he is a pretender who gains the Danish throne aided by the Swedes. This is why Heoroweard is easily made jarl of Swedes, as in Saxo's patriotic tradition Swedish rulers are frequently appointed and dethroned. In order to make this possible, Saxo, or his tradition, had to make Adils defeated by the Danes and losing his kingdom. In Arngrímur's Icelandic tradition, which had a more clear conception of the Swedish line of kings, Heoroweard could not be made ruler of Sweden, and so he was named as the ruler of a kingdom on the fringe of Sweden, Öland, a kingdom which was known to be independent, but whose line of kings was no longer known.

In Arngrímur and the Chronicon Lethrense, Heoroweard is the son-in-law of Adils, married to his daughter Skuld, whereas Hrólf Kraki's saga makes him the son-in-law of Helgi (according to Olrik, he could not be married to his own cousin). The account shows that Heoroweard had close connection with Adils and Olrik suggests that the real reason behind Hrólfs voyage to Uppsala was Adils' support of Heoroweard.

However, according to Snorri, Hrólf died during the Swedish king Östen's reign. If both Snorri and Olrik are right, the Swedish king who supported Hereoweard when attacking and killing Hrólf may not have been Adils, but Östen.

See also Origins for Beowulf and Hrólf Kraki for more on the historical background of these characters.
