= Hjalti =

Hjalti is an Icelandic masculine given name.

Notable people with the name Hjalti include:

- Hjalti Árnason (born 1963), Icelandic former strongman competitor and world champion powerlifter
- Hjalti Einarsson (born 1938), Icelandic handball player
- Hjalti Guðmundsson (born 1978), Icelandic swimmer
- Hjalti Skeggiason, Icelandic explorer
- Hjalti Þórðarson, Viking chief of 9th century Iceland

== See also ==
- Hjalte
