= Bjarkamál =

11th century skaldic poem

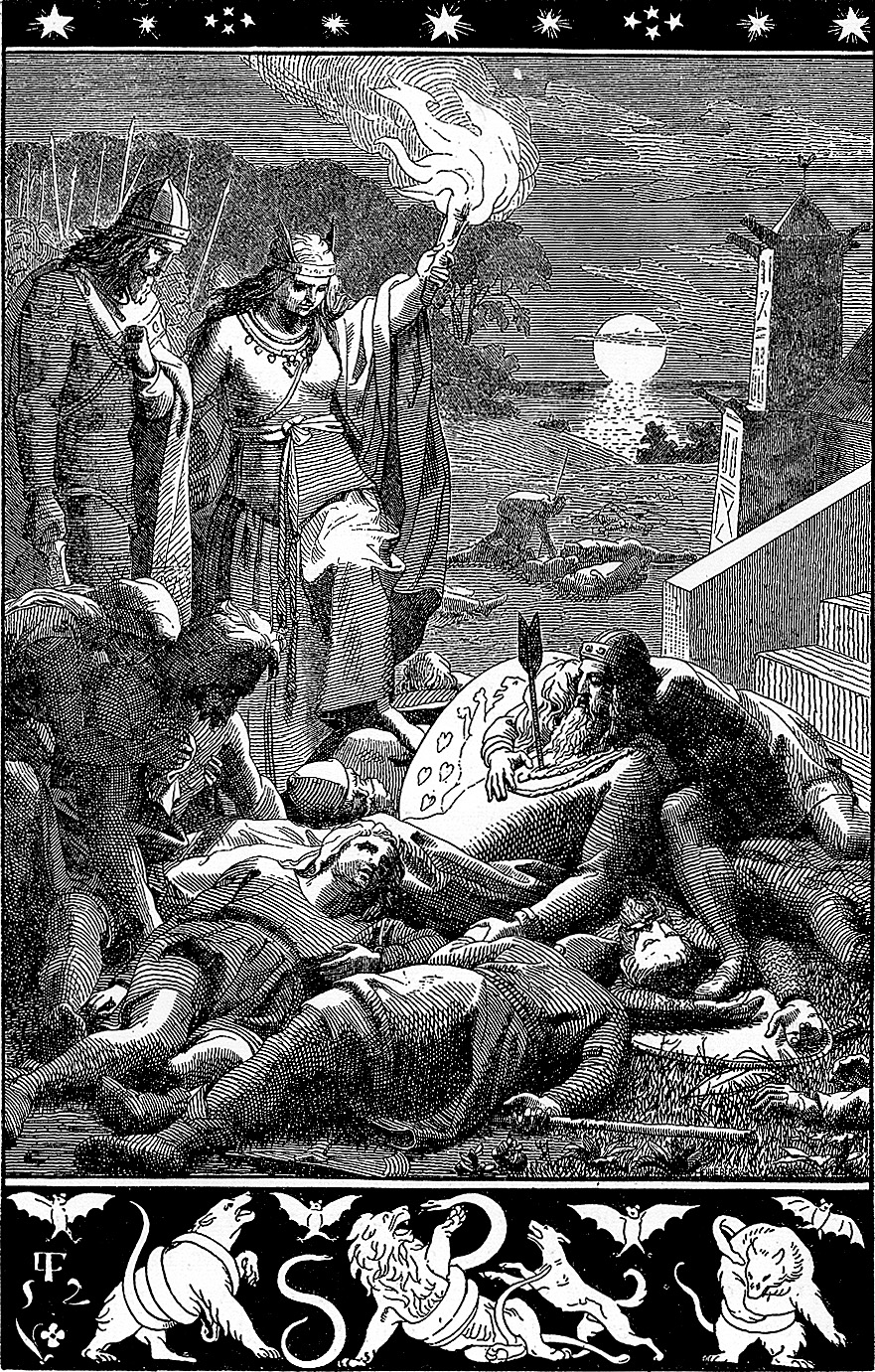
Hjarvard and Skuld confirm that Rolf Krake, Bodvar Bjarke, and the berserkers are dead. Illustration by Lorenz Frølich, 1856.

Bjarkamál (Bjarkemål in modern Norwegian and Danish) is an Old Norse poem from around the year 1000. Only a few lines have survived in the Old Norse version, the rest is known from Saxo's version in Latin. The latter consists of 298 hexameters, and tells the tale of Rolf Krake's downfall at Lejre on the isle of Sjælland, described in a dialogue between two of Rolf Krake's twelve berserkers, Bodvar Bjarke (hence the name of the poem), the most famous warrior at the court of the legendary Danish king Rolf Krake, and Hjalte (= hilt). The poem opens with Hjalte waking up his fellow berserkers, having realized they are under attack. In 1030, King Olav had the bard Tormod Kolbrunarskald recite the Bjarkamál to rouse his outnumbered army in the morning before the start of the Battle of Stiklestad, according to Fóstbrœðra saga.

In Bjarkamál, Rolf Krake has subdued the Swedes enough to make them pay him tax. Instead, they destroy his court at Lejre with a trick reminding us of Homer's Trojan horse: The wagons, bringing the valuables to Lejre, are filled with hidden weapons instead. When the Swedes, led by Hjartvar, arrive at Lejre, they are invited to a party, but unlike the Danes, they make sure to stay sober. Saxo has combined motives from the original Danish poem with motives from the second song in the Æneid, known as the nyktomakhi, where Æneas tells Dido about the battle between the Greeks and the Trojans in Troy. The nyktomakhi is of about the same length as Bjarkamál, and containing the same elements: The Trojan horse/the smuggling of Swedish weapons; Danes/Trojans are sound asleep when Swedes/Greeks attack them; plus the climax: The goddess Venus informs Æneas that it is the will of the gods themselves (that is, Jupiter, Juno, Minerva and Neptune) that Troy shall fall, and so he can honourably flee. Correspondingly, Rolf Krake's sister Hrut shows Bjarke the war god Odin, albeit the sight of Odin constitutes the moment when Bjarke and Hjalte die.

In Axel Olrik's rewrite of Bjarkemål, the mortally wounded Bjarke calls on Hrut to show him Odin, only to say that if Odin shows himself, Bjarke will take revenge (for the death of Rolf). He then lies down next to his dead king, because it is appropriate of a king's man to honour him so, when the king has been mild and just ("dådherlig"). The postscript of Roar Skovmand emphasises the rejection of Odin and that the king is honoured with loyalty, even after he is dead.

A well-known example of the old Norse faith in fylgjur, is Bjarke in Bjarkamál lying fast asleep in the hall, while his fylgja (Doppelgänger in animal shape), the bear, is fighting on his behalf outside. When eventually Bjarke gets up and starts fighting, the bear has disappeared.

The hymn "Sol er oppe" (= Sun is up) from 1817 is Grundtvig's version of the poem.

== Body ==
Most of the poem is lost. Only fragments of it are preserved in Skáldskaparmál and in Heimskringla. In Saxo Grammaticus' Gesta Danorum a Latin translation of the poem is found but it probably does not closely follow the original.

The following example may illustrate the difference between the original terse Old Norse and Saxo's elaborate translation.

Vekka yðr at víni
né at vífs rúnum,
heldr vekk yðr at hörðum
Hildar leiki.

— Finnur Jónsson's edition
Translation:

I wake you not to wine
nor to women’s converse,
but rather to the hard
game of Hild.

— Hollander's translation

Non ego virgineos iubeo cognoscere ludos
nec teneras tractare genas aut dulcia nuptis
oscula conferre et tenues astringere mammas,
non liquidum captare merum tenerumve fricare
femen et in niveos oculum iactare lacertos.
Evoco vos ad amara magis certamina Martis.
Bello opus est nec amore levi, nihil hic quoque facti
mollities enervis habet; res proelia poscit.

— J. Olrik's edition
Translation:

I do not now bid ye learn the sports of maidens,
nor stroke soft cheeks, nor give sweet kisses
to the bride and press the slender breasts,
nor desire the flowing wine and chafe the soft thigh and
cast eyes upon snowy arms.
I call you out to the sterner fray of War.
We need the battle, and not light love;
nerveless languor has no business here: our need calls for battles.

— Elton's translation
