= Healfdene =

Danish king (450 - 557)

- A mention of Halfdan in the Beowulf
- Known for: Legendary Danish King mentioned in Beowulf

Halfdan (Old Norse: Halfdan, Old English: Healfdene, Medieval Latin: Haldānus: "half Dane") was a late 5th and early 6th century legendary Danish king of the Scylding (Skjöldung) lineage, the son of king named Fróði in many accounts, noted mainly as the father to the two kings who succeeded him in the rule of Denmark, kings named Hroðgar and Halga in the Old English poem Beowulf and named Hróar and Helgi in Old Norse accounts.

== Various accounts ==
According to the Chronicon Lethrense and Saxo Grammaticus' Gesta Danorum (Book 2), Halfdan had two brothers named Ro and Skat who also sought the throne. Both were killed by Halfdan. Saxo adds that his brothers' supporters were hanged and that Halfdan continued to reign with great cruelty, but that he reigned long and died peaceably in extreme old age.

The Ynglinga saga gives Halfdan (in this work also son of a king named Fróði) a brother named Fridleif and says both were great warriors but that Halfdan was the better of the two. This might have been a lead-in to a feud between the brothers if Snorri had been dealing with Danish matters rather than Swedish matters.

Snorri here only tells us that Halfdan attacked King Aun of Sweden and drove him into exile into Götaland. Halfdan then ruled Sweden for twenty years until he died in Uppsala of sickness and was buried in a mound.

According to Ynglinga saga, a Danish king named Fróði the Bold aided Aun's successor Egil against the rebelling thrall Tunni. This may be Froda the Heathobard of Beowulf who becomes Fróði the slayer of Halfdan in other Norse traditions which do not make his end peaceful.

In the Saga of Hrolf Kraki, this Fróði is Halfdan's younger brother but in the Latin epitome to the Skjöldunga saga the younger brother, here a half-brother, is named Ingjalldus and this Ingjalldus is later father of a son named Frothi. Since in Beowulf Froda is father of a son named Ingeld, it is usually considered that the names have accidentally been interchanged in the tradition behind the Skjöldunga saga. In the Saga of Hrolf Kraki, Fróði brother of Halfdan is ruler of a separate kingdom. Halfdan was calm and good-natured but Fróði was cruel and vicious. Fróði attacked Halfdan's hall by night and burned it. Halfdan was killed in the battle and Fróði took over his country and his widow.

But eventually Halfdan's sons in turn killed Fróði to avenge their father's death. Thus the tradition in Beowulf of a feud between the Danes and Heathobards in which Fróda king of the Heathobards was slain appears in Norse texts as a family feud in which Halfdan's brother Fróði kills Halfdan and Halfdan's sons kill Fróði.

== Children of Halfdan ==
The poem Beowulf mentions Healfdene as follows:

Beowulf 59–63

Ðǣm fēower bearn | forðgerīmed
in worold wōcun, | weoroda rǣswa[n],
Heorogār ond Hrōðgār | ond Hālga til,
hȳrde ic þæt ———elan cwēn,
Heaðo-Scilfingas | healsgebedda.

Gummere's translation

Then, one after one, there woke to him,
to the chieftain of clansmen, children four:
Heorogar, then Hrothgar, then Halga brave;
and I heard that ———ela's queen,
the Heathoscylfing’s helpmate dear.

There is obviously something wrong with line 62. A name of a daughter has dropped out, a daughter who was the wife of someone whose name ends in -ela and who was a Heatho-Scylfing, a battle-Scylfing. It is likely enough that at some time in copying the poem a scribe was unable to make out the exact spelling of these names and so left the text blank at that point to be fixed up later. It was never fixed up and so the names were lost in later copies.

Surviving Scandinavian texts know nothing about Heorogar though they speak much of the other two sons. Two sources also mention Halfdan's daughter. According to the Latin epitome of the Skjöldung saga, the sons of Halfdanus are called Roas and Helgo and their sister Sigyna is married to a certain Sevillus. In Hrólf Kraki's Saga, Halfdan's eldest child is his daughter Signy who is married to a certain Jarl Sævil. Then Hróar and Helgi are born.

Friedrich Kluge (1896) accordingly suggested that the line be restored as hyrde ic ~~þ~~ Sigeneow wæs Sæwelan cwen, rendering the Norse names in Old English forms. But Kluge has been seldom followed by editors or translators, in part because Sævil in Hrólf Kraki's Saga is in no way connected with Sweden so far as is told. Since the only certain Swedish (Scylfing) royal name ending in -ela that has come down to us is Onela, more often -ela is expanded instead to Onela. By Old English poetic rules of alliteration the name of the daughter must also begin with a vowel. The choice is usually the name Yrs or Yrse, since Scandinavian tradition speaks much of Yrsa the granddaughter of Halfdan and wife of King Adils of Sweden. This assumes great shifting of names and roles, since Adils is the Eadgils of Beowulf, the enemy of Onela. Onela appears in Norse texts as Áli. Accordingly, many editors and translators prefer to simply note that the line is corrupt. But modern commentary sometimes refers to the marriage of Onela and Yrsa without indicating that this exists only through somewhat dubious conjectural emendation.

If the tradition of Halfdan/Healfdene being slain by Fróði/Froda is an old one, it might be that the Beowulf poet knew that tale and that Heorogar (Healfdene's eldest son in Beowulf) was imagined Heorogar to have died with Halfdan. Unfortunately the Beowulf poet skims over all such matters.

Family tree of the Scyldings (Kings of the Danes), Heathobards and Scylfings (Kings of the Swedes), according to Beowulf

♕ Heremod
♕ Scyld Scefing
♕ Beowulf
♕ Healfdene	♕ Ongentheow
♕ Heorogar	♕ Hrothgar	Wealhtheow	Halga	A daughter	♕ Onela	♕ Ohthere
Heoroweard	Hrethric	Hrothmund	Hrothulf	Froda	Eanmund	Eadgils
Freawaru	Ingeld

== Other traditions of Harold, Fróði and Halfdan ==
A similar story is told in the Gesta Danorum (Book 7) of two brother kings named Harold and Fróði in which the envious Fróði has his brother Harold killed by treachery. Harold leaves two sons behind named Harald and Halfdan, and the story of their vengeance on their uncle Fróði for killing their father Harald is almost identical to that found in Norse texts about Hróar and Helgi's vengeance on their uncle Fróði for killing their father Halfdan.

The Chronicon Lethrense indeed says that some call Halfdan's son Ro (that is Róar/Hrothgar) Halfdan instead.

As to this second Halfdan, Saxo has much to say about him, including his slaying of Siward king of Sweden and his battles against Erik son of his uncle Fróði by Signe, this Erik now the rightful king of Sweden. After many battles Halfdan gained the upper hand, Erik was bound with chains and left in a wild place for beasts to consume, and Halfdan became king of both Denmark and Sweden. Saxo relates further warlike exploits. Finally, this Halfdan died childless and left his kingdom to his friend King Ungvin of Götaland (see Geatish kings).

It is likely that more than one Halfdan has been confused with one another and with other kings, not to speak of simple invention by story tellers.

== See also ==
- Halfdan the Old
- Origins for Beowulf and Hrólf Kraki

Legendary titles
Preceded by Fróði	Mythological king of Denmark	Succeeded by Helgi or Heorogar
Preceded by Siward	Mythological king of Sweden	Succeeded by Ragnvald
Preceded by Aun	Mythological king of Sweden	Succeeded by Aun
Preceded by Frotho I	Mythological king of Denmark in Gesta Danorum	Succeeded by Ro and Helgo
Preceded by Dan	Mythological king of Denmark in Chronicon Lethrense	Succeeded by Ro and Helghe
