= Fróði =

Legendary Danish kings

Fróði (Old Norse: Frōði), known in modern Danish as Frode, is the name of a number of legendary Danish kings appearing in several texts from the Early and High Middle Ages.

== Name and etymology ==
The name Fróði is from Old Norse Old Norse: fróðr, meaning clever or wise. The word was used as an appellation given to learned individuals in Iceland, including chroniclers such as Sæmundr fróði.

While kings named Fróði do appear in Old Norse in several surviving documents from the Middle Ages, including Snorri Sturluson's Prose Edda (including in a section that preserves the Eddic poem Grottasǫngr) and his Ynglinga saga, as well as Hrólfs saga kraka and the genealogies of Hversu Noregr byggðist, many of the sources featuring them (including the earliest references to them) were in other languages. In these other languages and writing systems, the name of Fróði is rendered as:

- Froda, in Old English (Beowulf)
- Frothi, in Latin (Chronicon Roskildense, Chronicon Lethrense, and Sven Aggesen's Brevis historia regum Dacie)
- Frotho, in Latin (Gesta Danorum by Saxo Grammaticus)
- Vruote, in Middle High German (Rabenschlacht), via Old High German Fruote
- ᚠᚱᚮᚦᛅ (Froþe), in Old Danish runes using the Danish furthark with dotted runes (Codex Runicus)
- Frodo, in Latin (Arngrímur Jónsson's epitome of the Skjöldunga saga); this form of the name was used by J. R. R. Tolkien for Frodo Baggins, the main character in The Lord of the Rings

The name form Fróði is still in use in Icelandic and Faroese, but in modern Danish, Norwegian and Swedish the common form of the name is Frode.

== Characteristics of Fróði ==
Surviving sources describe several kings named Fróði, but do not agree in full regarding how many such kings there were or what each was known for. Some chronicles, such as Chronicon Lethrense, mention only one king Fróði; however, the Gesta Danorum by Saxo Grammaticus describes six kings.

There are some common characteristics or stories regarding kings named Fróði, which are distributed among the individuals named Fróði in different versions. These include:

- Overseeing a sort of golden age of peace, known as Fróði's Peace. Some versions attribute this to the contemporary rule of the Roman emperor Augustus and/or the birth of Christ. The Fróði responsible for this peace is sometimes known as Friðfróði ('Peace-Fróði'), Fróði frithgothae (in modern Danish, Frode Fredegod), or Fróði friðsami ('peaceful' or 'peace-loving'). In Gesta Danorum, Saxo Grammaticus attributes this peace to Frotho III. The Skjoldunga saga as summarised by Arngrímur Jónsson attributes it to Frodo I.
- Conflict with Halfdan (or equivalent rendering, such as Healfdene, Haldanus, etc.), or the family of Halfdan.
- Father of Halfdan
- The son of a king named Friðleifr (or equivalent rendering, such as Fridleif, Fridlevus, etc.)
- The father of Ingeld (or equivalent rendering, such as Ingel, Ingellus, Ingjaldr, etc.)
- Father of an earlier Gorm
- Slain by Mysing
- Slain by a tusked or horned animal

== Attestations ==
- The Fróði of the Grottasǫngr is said to be the son of Fridleif, the son of Skjǫldr. According to Ynglinga saga it was in this Fróði's beer that King Fjǫlnir drowned. Snorri Sturluson here and in the Skáldskaparmál make this Fróði the contemporary of Roman emperor Augustus and comments on the peacefulness of his reign, referred to as Fróði's Peace, suggesting a relationship to the birth of Christ. Though Icelandic sources make this Fróði a very early Danish king, in Gesta Danorum (Book 5), Saxo puts him late in his series of rulers, though including the chronological equation with Augustus and mentioning the birth of Christ.
- The Fróði who, according to Ynglinga saga and Gesta Danorum, was the father of Halfdan. He would have lived in the 5th or 6th century. He appears to be the same king who later in the Ynglinga saga aided the Swedish king Ongenþeow in defeating the thrall Tunni. Because of this, Egil and his son Ottar (Ohthere) became tributaries to the Danish king.
- Fróði the father of Ingjald, who in Beowulf is Froda the father of Ingeld and king of the Heathobards. The existence of the Heathobards has been forgotten in Norse texts and this Fróði there sometimes appears as the brother of Halfdan with the long hostility between Heathobards and Danes becoming a family feud between Halfdan and his brother Fróði. Fróði kills Halfdan and is himself slain by Halfdan's sons Helgi (Halga) and Hroar (Hrothgar). (In Arngrímur Jónsson's Latin summary to the lost Skjöldunga saga the names Fróði and Ingjald are interchanged. Saxo Grammaticus (Book 6) makes this Fróði instead to be a very late legendary king, the son of Fridleif son of Saxo's late peaceful Fróði. Saxo knows some of the story of this feud but nothing of any relationship to Halfdan. Instead Saxo relates how this Fróði was slain by Saxons and how, after a marriage alliance between his son Ingel and a Saxon princess to heal the feud, Ingel opened it again at the urging of an old warrior, just as the hero Beowulf prophesies of Ingjald in the poem Beowulf.
- A legend from Ydre in the South Swedish highlands tells that a king known as Frode was killed by Urkon, the same cow that created Lake Sommen.

The Gesta Danorum describes six Frothos:

- Frotho I
- Frotho II
- Frotho III
- Frotho IV
- Frotho V
- Frotho VI

== Proposed connection to Freyr ==
Connections have been proposed between the legendary King Fróði and the mythological Norse god Freyr.

The 19th century Swedish writer Viktor Rydberg considered Saxo's account of the reign of Frotho III to be a historicized version of the Vana-god Frey, which was demonstrated in the section detailing the king's war against the Huns.

In the Ynglinga saga, while Snorri Sturluson mentions Danish kings named Fróði (including Friðfróði shortly afterwards, possibly intended to be ruling concurrently), he says that Fróði's Peace began during the reign of the euhemerised Freyr in Sweden. In reference to this, Rudolf Simek states that "it has been realized for a long time that Fróði and Freyr are identical."

In Skírnismál (1), Freyr is referred to as inn fróði, sometimes translated as 'the wise one'.

== See also ==
- Elgfróði

Legendary titles
Preceded by Dan Mikilláti	King of Denmark	Succeeded by Halfdan
