= Fyrisvellir =

Marshy plain near the Temple at Uppsala

Coordinates: 59°52′19″N 17°36′51″E

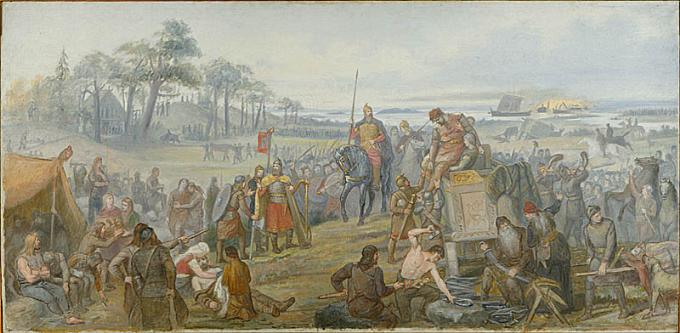
After the Battle of the Fýrisvellir, by Mårten Eskil Winge (1888).

Fyrisvellir, Fyris Wolds, or Fyrisvallarna, was the marshy plain (vellir) south of Gamla Uppsala where travellers had to leave the ships on the river Fyris (Fyrisån) and walk to the Temple at Uppsala and the hall of the Swedish king.

== Etymology ==
The name is related to, or derived from, Old Norse Fyrva which meant "to ebb" and it referred to the partially inundated soggy plains that today are dry farmland and the modern town of Uppsala. In medieval times, a royal estate called Førisæng, "Fyris meadow", was located near this field. The small lakes Övre Föret, "the Upper Fyri", and Nedre Föret, "the Lower Fyri", are remains of this marsh and retain a modern form of Fyri (the -t suffix is the definite article, which lake names always take in Swedish). The field went alongside what was renamed the Fyris river (Fyrisån) in the 17th century to make the connection between the river and the Sagas more obvious.

== Mythology ==
In Scandinavian mythology, the battle between Haki and Hugleik took place on these wolds, as well as that between Haki and Jorund. It was also the location of the Battle of the Fýrisvellir between Eric the Victorious and his nephew Styrbjörn the Strong, in the 980s.

According to a story about Hrólf Kraki found in many texts, Hrólf spread gold on this plain as he and his men were fleeing the Swedish king Adils. The king's men then dismounted to collect the gold. In Skaldic poetry, gold was often referred to with the kenning the seed of the Fyris Wolds.
