= Skjöldunga saga =

Late 12th-century book by Arngrímur Jónsson

The Skjöldunga saga (or, in another standardised Old Norse spelling, Skjǫldunga saga) was an Old Norse legendary saga. Dating from c. 1180 – 1200, the saga was lost in its original form. The saga focused on the Danish dynasty of Scylding (Old Norse Skjöldung, plural Skjöldungar), the same semi-legendary dynasty featured in the Old English poem Beowulf. The fragmentary Icelandic text known as Sögubrot af nokkrum fornkonungum is believed to be based on the Skjöldunga saga, perhaps deriving from a late version of that work. Another surviving source that contains material from the saga (and continues where Sögubrot ends) is Arngrimur's Ad catalogum regum Sveciæ annotanda.

Arngrímur Jónsson paraphrased parts of it into Latin, and parts of it are thought to be preserved in other sagas, including Óláfs saga Tryggvasonar en mesta and Ragnarssona þáttr. It may relate to Saxo Grammaticus and contain a version of the story that inspired the lost Ur-Hamlet and ultimately William Shakespeare's Hamlet.

== Related Reading ==
- Neijmann, Daisy L. (2006) A History of Icelandic Literature (American-Scandinavian Foundation) ISBN 978-0803233461
- Ólason, Vésteinn (2005) "Family Sagas" in A Companion to Old Norse-Icelandic Literature and Culture (Rory McTurk, ed. Oxford: Blackwell Publishing) ISBN 978-1405163675
- Jakobsson, Ármann (2005) "Royal Biography" in A Companion to Old Norse-Icelandic Literature and Culture (Rory McTurk, ed. Oxford: Blackwell Publishing) ISBN 978-1405163675
- Ross, Margaret Clunies (2000) Old Icelandic Literature and Society (Cambridge University Press) ISBN 9780521631129
- Würth, Stefanie (2005) "Historiography and Pseudo-History" in A Companion to Old Norse-Icelandic Literature and Culture (Rory McTurk, ed. Oxford: Blackwell Publishing) ISBN 978-1405163675
