= List of legendary kings of Denmark =

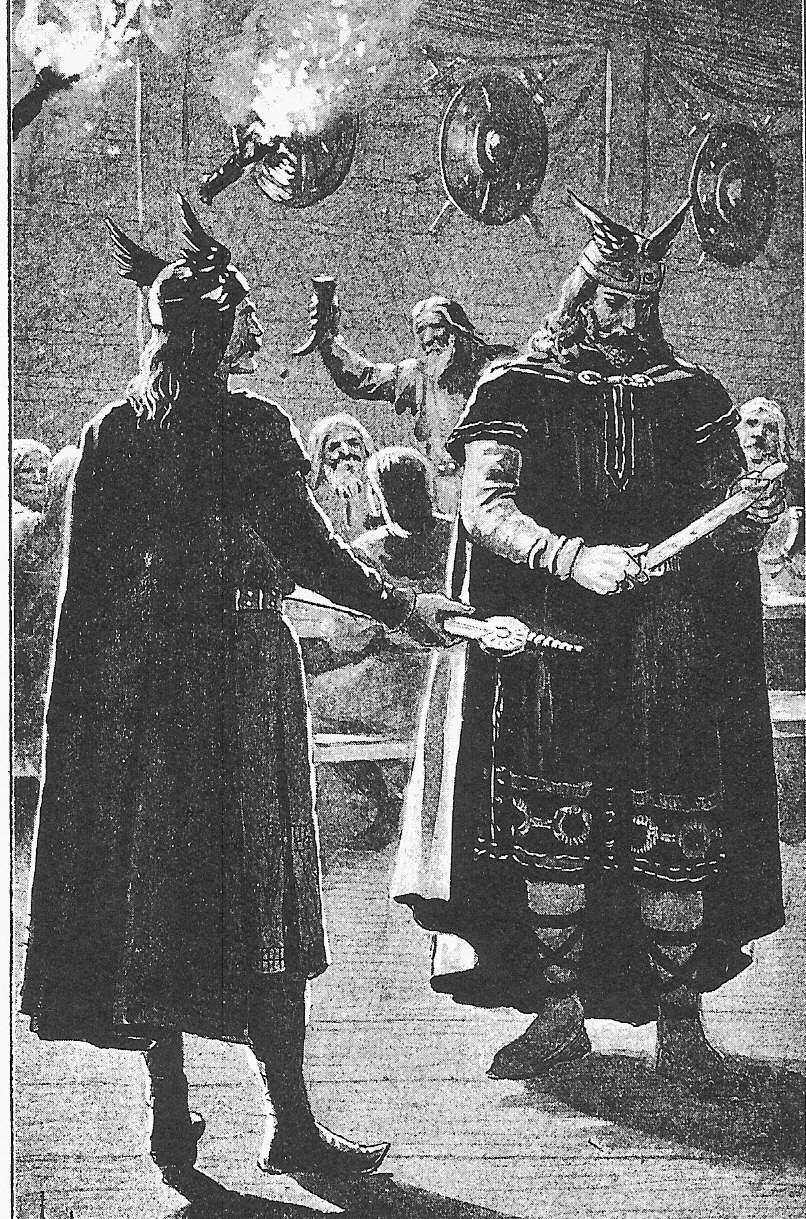
Two legendary Danish kings, Hjörvarðr and Hrólfr Kraki, illustrated by Jenny Nyström (1895) in a scene from Hrólfs saga kraka. Hrólfr adjusts his belt while Hjörvarðr, who later overthrows him, holds his sword and is thus tricked into being his subordinate.

The legendary kings of Denmark were, according to legend, the monarchs of Denmark, the Danes, or specific lands of Denmark (Zealand, Jutland or Scania) who preceded Gorm the Old, a king who reigned c. 930s to c. 960s and is the earliest reliably attested Danish ruler. Gorm's son, Harald Bluetooth, oversaw the widespread Christianization of Denmark, meaning that the legendary kings listed here are those from before Christianization and are predominantly (but not entirely) pagan. Kings preceding Gorm may be partly historical (especially those near to Gorm's time), but even these are at least semi-legendary; many earlier kings are entirely mythological. Some are based on earlier euhemerised stories (that is, figures from mythological folktales were depicted as historical kings by medieval writers such as Saxo Grammaticus).

There are many medieval accounts of the Danish kings of the Dark Ages, and these accounts can be confusing and contradictory (although there is overlap and different sources can include the same kings). This article presents the legendary kings from each source separately.

== Danish sources ==
=== Runestones ===
Runestones are raised stones, marked with a runic inscription. In the Viking Age, and especially later in the Viking Age, runestones were often raised in memorial of dead people, including kings. Many were raised by contemporaries of the deceased, making runestones important archeological and historical evidence. Although they contain very little detail about the people they mention, they are vital corroborating evidence for individuals (especially kings) that are known of through other sources (see below).

Surviving runestones that were found in lands that were part of Denmark during the Viking Age and refer to early and legendary kings of Denmark include:

- The Jelling stones (Rundata DR 41 and DR 42), which refers to King Gorm, his wife Thyra, and their son King Harald.
- The Hedeby stones, of which two (Rundata DR 1 and DR 3) refer to King Suin, and the other two (the Sigtrygg Runestones, DR 2 and DR 4) were raised by Ásfrið, daughter of Odinkar, to memorialise King Sigtrygg, Ásfrið's son with Gnupa.
- The first Sønder Vissing Runestone (DR 55), which was raised by Tofa, wife of Harald the Good (Gorm's son) and daughter of Misitiwi, in honour of her mother.
- The Hällestad Runestones and Aars stone, which refer to Gorm's son Toke or Valtoke, who is not known from other sources and apparently died at the Battle of Fýrisvellir.

In summary, the legendary Danish kings preceding Gorm the Old who are recorded on Viking Age runestones are:

- Gnupa
- Sigtrygg, Gnupa's son
- Gorm

=== Adam of Bremen ===
Adam of Bremen was an 11th century German chronicler. Although not Danish himself, he spent time in the court of the Danish king Svend Estridson. Adam claims to derive much of the information on Danish history from his Latin chronicle Gesta Hammaburgensis ecclesiae pontificum ("Deeds of the Bishops of Hamburg") from conversations with Svend (whom he quotes verbatim in several places) and from information provided by Danish bishops. He also references the historians of the Franks (see, for example, the section on the Royal Frankish Annals, below) and hagiographies such as Vita Ansgarii.

Gesta Hammaburgensis ecclesiae pontificum names several 10th century kings preceding Gorm the Old. Kings whose histories are derived from information provided by Svend Estridson include:

- Helge ("Heiligonem" in accusative, nominative "*Heiligo"), who ruled Norway after the defeat of the Norsemen and was renowned for his justice and sanctity (1.XLVIII)
- Olaf ("Olaph"), a Swedish prince who conquered Denmark, succeeded Helge, and had many sons (1.XLVIII, 1.LII)
- Chnuba and Gyrd ("Chnob et Gurd"), Olaf's sons who possessed the realm after his death (1.XLVIII)
- Sigeric ("Sigerich"), who succeeded after Olaf and his sons (1.LII)
- Harthacnut ("Hardegon", "Hardecnudth"), the son of "Svein"; Harthacnut came from "Nortmannia" and deprived Sigeric of the kingdom (1.LII, 1.LV)

Mentioned kings preceding Gorm the Old, whose histories are derived from other sources, include:

- Gotafrid (1.xiv, 1.xxxix)
- Hemming, Gotafrid's cousin who succeeded him (1.xiv)
- Sigefrid and Anulo, Gotafrid's nephews who went to war with each other over Hemming's succession. Both kings were killed, but Anulo's faction won and placed Reginfrid and Harald on the throne. (1.xv, 1.xxxix)
- Reginfrid, who was forced out of Denmark by his brother Harald and resorted to piracy (1.xv)
- Harald (i.e. Harald Klak), who was forced out by the sons of Gotafrid and fled to the court of Louis the Pious, where he (with his wife and brother Horuch) were converted to Christianity and baptised (1.xv)
- Horic, who was friendly to Christians, and who was killed in a war against his nephew Gudorm (1.xxv, 1.xxvi, 1.xxviii)
- Horic the younger, the only royal survivor of the war between Horic the elder and Gudorm. On his ascension to the throne, he immediately expelled all Christian priests and closed the churches, but was later converted to Christianity by Ansgar. (1.xxviii, 1.xxix)
- Sigefrid and his brother Halfdan (1.xxxvii)
- Horic (1.xxxvii)
- Orwig (1.xxxvii)
- Gotafrid (1.xxxvii)
- Rudolf (1.xxxvii)
- Ingvar, son of Lodbrok (possibly a conflation of Ivar the Boneless, one of Ragnar Lodbrok's sons who is not traditionally credited with ruling Denmark, with Sigurd Snake-in-the-Eye, who is) (1.xxxvii)
- Wrm (i.e. Gorm the Old, rendered in various manuscripts as "Vurm", "Wrm", "Worm", "Gorm", or "Gwyrm"), son of Harthacnut; described by Adam of Bremen as a "wyrm" who tried to eradicate Christianity in Denmark, but was succeeded by his son Harold who converted the country to that religion (1.LV, 1.LVII, 1.LVIIII, 1.LIX)

=== Chronicon Roskildense ===
The family tree of Kings of the Danes to Cnut the Great, according to Chronicon Roskildense

Kings of the Danes are marked with a crown (♕).

♕ Harald	♕ Heric
KEY
♕ Heric the Child	Explicit familial relationship
Doubtful familial relationship
♕ Frothi	Succession by other or unclear means
♕ Gorm
♕ Harald Blatan aka Clac Harald	Sven
♕ Haldan	♕ Gorm	Hartha Knut, King of the Angles	Haakon, King of the Norsemen
♕ Harold	Trucco
♕ Swen Forkbeard aka Swen Otto	♕ Olaf Cracaben, King of Norway
♕ Kanute	Olaf, King of Norway

The source used for the genealogical information and name spellings is the English translation provided by Mischa Hooker of Augustana College.

The earliest known history of Denmark to be written in Denmark was Chronicon Roskildense ("The Chronicle of Roskilde"), which was composed in Latin by an unknown author (likely connected with Roskilde Cathedral) in the mid-12th century. Many early sections rely on the work of Adam of Bremen (see above).

It begins in the year 826, with the introduction of Christianity to Denmark and conversion of Harald Klak. The original chronicle ends with the appointment of Eskil of Lund as Archbishop of Lund in 1137 or 1138 (and was likely written about this time), and this is followed by a continuation by a different author up to the ascension of Valdemar I of Denmark in 1157. As such, most of the chronicle takes place after the Christianisation of Denmark, but the early sections do list several semi-legendary kings preceding Gorm the Old. These are:

1. Harald Klak ("Haraldus")
2. Horik I ("Hericus"), who is referred to here as Harald Klak's brother.
3. Horik II ("Hericus Puer", or Heric the Child), of whom the chronicle says there was significant doubt that he was Horik I's son. He temporarily ejected the Christians and priests from Denmark.
4. Frothi
5. Gorm
6. Harald Bluetooth ("Haraldus" with the surname "Blatan"), who is incorrectly identified also as "Clac Harald". He ruled with his father Gorm for 15 years, then after his father's death for a further 50 years.
7. Halfdan ("Haldanus"), of whom it is said it is doubtful that he was the son of Clac Harald, and that he said slain along with all his sons.
8. Gorm, brother of Hartha Knut (who ruled the Angles)

The Chronicon Roskildense refers to two separate kings named Gorm (historically only one, Gorm the Old, is known of), both of whom had sons named Harald (based on Harald Bluetooth). Furthermore there are two individuals named Sven (based on Sveyn Forkbeard), one the father of the second Gorm and the other his grandson. Both Svens invaded Anglia and overthrew a king (Aldradus or Adeldrad, both based on Æthelred the Unready). The second Gorm is succeeded by his son Harald, who is succeeded by the second Sven, who is temporarily replaced by Olaf Cracaben. After the second Sven dies, he is succeeded by Cnut the Great ("Kanutus"), and thereafter the chronicle begins to align more with accepted history. (Later, Saxo Grammaticus would not only retain these two kings named Gorm, but add a third; see below.)

Ivar the Boneless ("Ywar"), son of Ragnar Lodbrok ("Lothpardus"), isn't called a king of the Danes in Chronicon Roskildense, but he is a king of the Norsemen ("rex Normannorum") during the reign of Horik II and leads several kings of the Danes (the chronicle explains that, at the time, there were as many as five kings in Denmark: two in Jutland, a third in Fyn, a fourth in Sjælland, and a fifth in Scania) to destroy the kingdom of the Franks. He then leads a fleet to invade Britain (the Great Heathen Army). The Chronicon mentions several of his brothers (Ingvar, Ubbi, Byorn, and Ulf) as rulers of northern nations; Ingvar may be so named in reference to Adam of Bremen, who used the name Ingvar as a son of Lodbrok who ruled as King of the Danes.

=== Chronicon Lethrense ===
The family tree of legendary Kings of the Danes, according to Chronicon Lethrense

Kings of the Danes are marked with a crown (♕).

Ypper, King of Uppsala ♂
KEY
Nori ♂	Østen ♂	♕ Dan ♂	Dannia ♀	Marriage or coupling
Parent and child
Rolfcarl, aka Rolf, a baron ♂	♕ Ro ♂	Ro's wife ♀	Succession by other means
Thora ♀
♕ Helgi ♂	♕ Haldan ♂
Athisl, King of Swethia ♂	Ursula ♀	♕ Raka, a dog ♂
Siward Albus ♂	♕ Snyo ♂
♕ Hiarwart ♂	Sculd ♀	♕ Rolf Kraki ♂
Hamund ♂
♕ Aki ♂	Haghbard ♂	daughter of Rolf Kraki ♀	♕ Fritleff ♂
♕ Frothi Largus ♂
♕ Ingyald ♂
♕ Olav ♂
♕ Asa ♀
♕ Harald Hildetan (war-tooth) ♂
♕ Hethae ♀

The source used for the genealogical information and name spellings is the English translation provided by Mischa Hooker of Augustana College.

The earliest known treatment of Danish legendary history to be written in Denmark was Chronicon Lethrense ("The Chronicle of Lejre"), which was composed in Latin by an unknown author, likely from Roskilde and transmitted as part of the Annales Lundenses (although it was likely originally a separate work). Chronicon Lethrense was written in the mid- to late-12th century, possibly alongside or as a sort of prequel to Chronicon Roskildense (see above), which depicts historical kings after the introduction of Christianity to Denmark.

Chronicon Lethrense was hugely influential, and many subsequent chronicles were at least partly based on it. Almost all monarchs mentioned appear in subsequent chronicles, with the notable exception of the queen regnant, Asa. (Another queen regnant, Hethae, appears in Gesta Danorum as a ruler of Zealand only, but is swiftly deposed and made a tributary ruler in Jutland.) It states that the first king of the Danes was a certain Dan (after whom the tribe was named), who was the son of a Swedish king named Ypper. This is said to be both when Augustus invaded Denmark and during the time of the Biblical King David, referring to two rulers who lived about a thousand years apart.

Chronicon Lethrense also explicitly conflates the kingdoms of Denmark with Dacia, a conceit that appears in the earlier works of Dudo of Saint-Quentin, and in subsequent works such as Historia Regum Britanniae (see below).

Monarchs in the Chronicon Lethrense are:

1. Dan, son of Ypper (a primeval king of Sweden)
2. Ro, who takes the place of Haldan in other chronicles (that is, Ro and Haldan have reversed roles in the Chronicon Lethrense compared to other chronicles; usually Haldan is the father of Ro, here Ro is the father of Haldan)
3. Haldan, who takes the place of Ro in other chronicles
4. Helgi, who rules as a sea-king while his brother rules in Lejre
5. A dog king Raka (or Racha or Rachi), placed to rule over Denmark on the order of the Swedish king Athisl
6. Snyo
7. Rolf Kraki
8. Hiarwart
9. Aki, brother of Haghbardus and son of Hamundus
10. Fritleff
11. Frotha Largus (the Generous)
12. Ingyald
13. Olav
14. Asa, queen, unrelated to but possibly inspired by the contemporaneous Queen Åsa of Agder
15. Harald Hyldetan, defeated by King Ring of Swethia in battle at Brawel
16. Hethae, queen who founded Hethaeby in Jutland

=== Sven Aggesen ===
The family tree of legendary Kings of the Danes, according to Brevis historia regum Dacie by Sven Aggesen

Kings of the Danes are marked with a crown (♕).

♕ Skiold
KEY
Frothi	♕ Halfdan	Marriage or coupling
Parent and child
♕ Helghi	Inheritance by other or unclear means
♕ Rolf Kraki
♕ Rokil Slagenback
♕ Frothi the Bold
♕ Wermund
♕ Uffi
♕ Dan the High-minded, or the Proud
♕ Frothi the Old
♕ Frithlefer
♕ Frothi Frithgothæ, or the Magnificent
♕ Ingiald
♕ Olaf	Regner Lothbrogh
daughter	♕ Sighwarth
♕ Knut (first of that name in Denmark)
♕ Snio
♕ Klak-Harald
♕ Gorm Løghæ	Thyrwi, the Ornament of the Realm
historical kings of Denmark

The source used for the genealogical information and name spellings is the English translation by Eric Christiansen.

Sven Aggesen was a 12th century Danish chronicler who wrote Brevis historia regum Dacie ("A Short History of the Kings of Denmark"). He was a contemporary of Saxo Grammaticus and noted in his writings that he was aware of Saxo's then-in progress work on the Gesta Danorum (see below), but also described himself (incorrectly) as the first writer to document the kings of Denmark.

Sven says that the first king of Denmark was Skiold, whose descendants are the Skioldungar. The line of kings continues from Skiold to Gorm the Old with only one break, between Ingiald and Olaf. It says, "After his [Ingeld's] time no son succeeded his father to the throne for a space of many centuries. It passed to grandsons, or nephews, who, to be sure, were sprung from the royal stock on the one side." It is unclear if this represents a gap in the lineage (i.e. that other unmentioned kings ruled between Ingeld and Olaf) or if Olaf succeeded Ingeld directly but began a period in which there was no direct father-to-son succession. The latter is possible given, for example, that Olaf took the throne by conquest, and that after Olaf the landowner Ennignup (possibly a reference to Gnupa) became guardian of the kingdom before Knut came to power. When first written, the chronicle was apparently accompanied by an extensive genealogy as an appendix, but this appendix has not survived.

Kings of Denmark mentioned in Aggesen's Brevis historia regum Dacie are:

1. Skiold
2. Halfdan
3. Helghi
4. Rolf Kraki
5. Rokil Slagenback
6. Frothi the Bold
7. Wermund
8. Uffi
9. Dan the High-minded, or the Proud
10. Frothi the Old
11. Frithlefer
12. Frothi Frithgothæ, or the Magnificent
13. Ingiald
14. Olaf
15. Sighwarth, son of Regner Lothbrogh
16. Knut, first of that name in Denmark
17. Snio
18. Klak-Harald
19. Gorm Løghæ

=== Gesta Danorum ===
Gesta Danorum ("Deeds of the Danes") by Saxo Grammaticus is the most extensive, and most widely known Danish chronicle of Danish kings. It was written in Latin in the 12th century, and comprises 16 books, of which the first 9 relate to legendary kings leading up to Gorm the Old, and the remaining 7 are more recent and historical. The work is explicitly euhemeristic, repeatedly referring to certain individuals (including Odin, Baldr, and Thor) as mortal humans that people believed to be, and worshipped as, gods.

Saxo draws on many sources for this work. In several places where the sources appear contradictory, he will adapt more than one version at different places in the timeline, often creating multiple individuals where earlier stories had only one. For example, instead of a single king named Gorm the Old, Saxo says there were three different kings named Gorm. Sigurd Hring appears as two different kings, Ringo and Siwardus Ring.

Gesta Danorum does not distinguish between kings of the same name, except through context or the occasional epithet. However, the popularity of the work meant that the kings list that first appeared in it was used extensively in later works, some of which appended regnal numbers so that the kings could be easily identified individually. For example, in the 17th century, the priest and mathematician Erico Olai Tormio (or Eric Olufsen Torm) produced an engraving of all Danish kings up to that date in honour of king Christian IV of Denmark, called Veræ effigies regum omnium, qvi a primo Dan usqve Christianum IV modo regnantem imperii Danici gloria eminuerunt (or "True images of all the kings, from Dan the first all the way to Christian IV the present king of the Danish empire, stood out in glory"). The legendary kings featured in the work are identical to those from the Gesta Danorum, with the addition of regnal numbers. This work also adds lengths of reigns, not always included in the original. In 1685, another work gave the stories and images of the kings up to then-King Christian V of Denmark, this time a book in German by Johann Christoph Beer called Der Königen in Dän[n]emark Leben, Regierung und Absterben, von dem Ersten König Dan an, Biß auf den izt-regierenden König Christian den Fünfften ("The Lives, Reigns and Deaths of the Kings of Denmark, from Dan the first to the present Christian V"). This book also used Gesta Danorum as its base for the list of legendary kings.

The legendary Danish kings from the Gesta Danorum, with regnal numbers from the Veræ effigies of Erico Olai Tormio (and the numbers of the books in which they are mentioned given in parentheses), are:

1. Dan I (1)
2. Humblus (1)
3. Lotherus (1)
4. Skioldus (1)
5. Gram (1)
6. Svibdagerus (1)
7. Guthormus (1)
8. Hadingus (1,2,5)
9. Frotho I (2,5)
10. Ubbe (briefly seized the kingdom from Frotho) (2)
11. Haldanus I (2)
12. Roe (2)
13. Helgo (2,3)
14. Rolvo Krake (2,3)
15. Hiarwarthus (king for less than a single day) (2,3)
16. Høtherus (and Balderus) (2,3)
17. Rørikus Slyngebond (the grandfather of Hamlet) (3)
18. Wiglecus (4)
19. Wermundus (4)
20. Uffo (aka Olavus the Gentle) (4)
21. Dan II (4)
22. Huglecus (4)
23. Frotho II, the Vigorous (4)
24. Dan III (4)
25. Fridlevus I, the Swift (4,5)
26. Frotho III (5,6)
27. Hiarnus
28. Fridlevus II (6)
29. Frotho IV (6)
30. Ingellus (6,7)
31. Olavus I (6,7)
32. Frotho V (7)
33. Haraldus I (7)
34. Haldanus II Biargrammus (7)
35. Haraldus II (7)
36. Unguinus (7)
37. Sywaldus I (7)
38. Sygarus (7)
39. Sywaldus II (7)
40. Haldanus III (7)
41. Haraldus III Hyldetan (Harald Wartooth) (7,8)
42. Ringo I (defeated the Danes, but immediately appointed Hetha and Olo as rulers) (7,8)
43. Hetha (ruled the lands except Scania, until overthrown by Olo) (8)
44. Olo the Vigorous (referred to by Erico Olai Tormio as Olaus, that is Olavus II) (7,8)
45. Omundus (8)
46. Sywardus I (8)
47. Buthlus (8)
48. Iarmericus (8)
49. Broderus (8)
50. Sywaldus III (8)
51. Snio (8)
52. Biorn (8)
53. Haraldus IV (8)
54. Gormo I (8)
55. Gotricus (8,9)
56. Olavus III (9)
57. Hemmingus (9)
58. Siwardus II Ring (9)
59. Ringo II (9)
60. Regnerus Lothbrog (9)
61. Haraldus (who repeatedly won Denmark from Regnerus and lost it to him again, unnumbered as not in the list of Erico Olai Tormio) (9)
62. Siwardus and Ericus (co-rulers jointly after Regnerus' death until ousted by the sons of Regnerus, unnumbered as not in the list of Erico Olai Tormio) (9)
63. Siwardus III Snake-eye (9)
64. Ericus I (9)
65. Ericus II (9)
66. Kanutus I (9)
67. Frotho VI (9)
68. Gormo II, the English (9)
69. Haraldus V (9)
70. Gormo III (9)

In Book 6 of Gesta Danorum, Saxo also refers to a certain Hakon as the tyrant of Denmark when describing the early years of the champion Starkad (Hakon and Starkad also appear in Book 7). However, Hakon does not appear to fit into the timeline or family tree of Danish rulers as described in the rest of Gesta Danorum.

=== Annales Ryenses ===
The family tree of legendary Kings of the Danes, according to the Annales Ryenses

Kings of the Danes are marked with a crown (♕).

Humblæ ♂
KEY
♕1 Dan I ♂	Marriage or coupling
Parent and child
♕2 Humblæ ♂	♕3 Lother ♂	Succession by other or unclear means
♕4 Skiold ♂
♕5 Gram ♂
♕6 Suibdager, King of Norway ♂
♕7 Haddinger ♂
♕8 Frothi him fæmildæ ♂
♕9 Haldanus ♂
Rolfkarl, a peasant ♂
♕10 Ro ♂
Thora ♀
♕11 Haldan ♂	♕11-12 Helgi ♂
daughter of Helgi ♀	Hamundus ♂
♕13 Racki, a dog	♕14 Snyo ♂	♕15 Rolfkraki ♂	sister of Rolfkraki ♀	♕16 Hyarwardus ♂	♕17 Hako ♂
daughter of Rolfkraki ♀	♕18 Frithlæf ♂
♕19 Othen ♂
♕20 Balder ♂	♕21 Hothær ♂	♕22 Boyo, King of Sweden ♂
♕23 Rørik ♂
♕24 Orwændæl ♂	wife of Orwændæl ♀	♕25 Fengo ♂
♕26 Ambletus ♂	wife of Ambletus ♀	♕27 Wichlechus ♂
♕28 Wermundus the blind ♂
♕29 Uffo the strong ♂
♕30 Olaf, called Dan hin storlatene ♂
♕31 Hughaelec ♂	♕32 Frothi the Bold ♂
♕33 Dan ♂	♕34 Frithleuus ♂
♕35 Frothi hin frithgothae ♂
♕36 Yærni ♂
♕37 Frithleuus ♂
♕38 Frothi the Bold ♂
♕39 Ingellus ♂
♕40 Olaf ♂
♕41 Haraldus ♂	♕42 Frothi Rethbanæ ♂
♕43 Ericus, King of Sweden ♂	♕44 Haldan byærngram ♂	♕45 Hugni ♂
♕46 Siwald ♂
♕47 Sigerus ♂
♕48 Gødric
Tole ♀	♕49 Borgardus, in Scania ♂	♕50 Hundængær, in Zealand ♂	♕51 Hani, in Funen ♂	♕52 Hothær, in southern Jutland ♂	♕53 Reynær, in northern Jutland ♂
♕54 Haldanus the Strong ♂
♕55 Harald Hildertan ♂
♕56 Ringer ♂	♕57 Harald ♂	♕58 Øli the Bold ♂
♕59 Ømundær
♕60 Siward	♕61 Butæl
♕62 Yarmarus Rek	♕63 Brothær
♕64 Siwald
♕65 Snio	♕66 Byorn
♕67 Haraldus
♕68 Gorm
♕69 Godric the Generous, called Godefrith
♕70 Olaf, called Gothdrankær
♕71 Hemming
♕72 Ring, in Jutland	♕73 Siwardus, in the islands
♕74 Reynær Lothbroki

Source is Annales Danici medii ævi, edited by Ellen Jørgensen, pages 62-73, "Annales Ryenses".

The Annales Ryenses, called the Rydårbogen in modern Danish or the Annals of Ryd in English, is a chronicle of Danish history, including a numbered list of Danish kings from Dan, eponym of the Danes and Denmark whose lineage is traced back to the Biblical Japheth, to King Erik VI (Erik Menved). The earliest surviving manuscript of the Annals goes up to the year 1288, and was likely written soon after this.

Annales Ryenses is heavily inspired by previous chronicles, especially Gesta Danorum and Chronicon Lethrense, but includes a different list of kings. For example:

- The Annales Ryenses combines the lineage from Chronicon Lethrense, which considered Haldan to be the son of Ro, with the lineage made standard by Gesta Danorum, which considered Roe to be the son of Haldanus, by having Haldanus be the father of Ro, who is then father of another Haldan.
- Like Chronicon Lethrense and the later Gesta Danorum på danskæ, Annales Ryenses places the dog king between the reigns of Helgi and Rolfkraki, which Gesta Danorum does not.
- It also makes Odin (as "Othen") and Balder as kings of Denmark preceding Hothær, whereas in Saxo's version they were false gods with whom Høtherus fought, but who were never kings of Denmark.
- It gives the name Olaf as an alternate name for Dan, the son of Uffo, although in Gesta Danorum the name Olaf the Gentle was an alternate name for Uffo himself.

The legendary Danish kings from Annales Ryenses are:

1. Dan, son of Humblæ
2. Humblæ, son of Dan
3. Lother, brother of Humblæ
4. Skiold, son of Lother
5. Gram, son of Skiold
6. Suibdager, King of Norway
7. Haddinger, son of Gram
8. Frothi hin fæmildæ, son of Haddinger
9. Haldanus, son of Frothi
10. Ro, son of Haldanus
11. Haldan and Helgi, sons of Ro
12. Helgi alone, a sea-king, brother of Haldan
13. Racki, a dog king, put on the throne by Athislus
14. Snyo
15. Rolfkraki, son of Helgi
16. Hyarwardus
17. Haki, son of Hamundus
18. Frithlæf, who married the daughter of Rolfkraki
19. Othen
20. Balder, son of Othen
21. Hothær
22. Boyo, king of Sweden
23. Rørik, son of Boyo
24. Orwendæl
25. Fengo, brother of Orwendæl
26. Ambletus, son of Orwendæl
27. Wichlechus, King of Norway
28. Wermundus blinde (the blind), son of Wichlechus
29. Uffo starke (the strong), son of Wermundus
30. Olaf, aka Dan hin storlatene
31. Hughælec
32. Frothi hin frecne (the bold)
33. Dan, son of Frothi
34. Frithleuus
35. Frothi hin frithgothæ, son of Frithleuus
36. Yærni (equivalent to Saxo's Hiarnus)
37. Frithleuus, son of Frothi Frithgothæ
38. Frothi hin fræknæ (the bold), son of Frithleuus
39. Ingellus, son of Frothi
40. Olaf, son of Ingellus
41. Haraldus, son of Olaf
42. Frothi Rethbanæ, brother of Haraldus
43. Ericus, King of Sweden
44. Haldan byœrngram, son of Haraldus
45. Hugni, brother of Haldan
46. Siwald, son of Hugni
47. Sigerus, son of Siwald
48. Gødric, nephew of Sigerus. After Gødric's death, Denmark was split into five kingdoms:
49. Borgardus (or Borchardus), who married Siwald's daughter Tole, and ruled in Scania
50. Hundængær, who ruled in Zealand
51. Hani, who ruled in Funen
52. Hothær, who ruled in south Jutland
53. Reynær, who ruled in north Jutland
54. Haldanus hin stærkæ (the strong)
55. Harald Hildertan, son of Borchardus
56. Ringer (or Ringær), nephew of Harald
57. Harald, brother of Ringer
58. Øli hin fræcnæ (the bold), brother of Harald
59. Omundær (or Ømundær), son of Øli
60. Siward, son of Ømundær
61. Butæl, brother of Siward
62. Yarmarus (or Iarmarus) Rek, son of Siward
63. Brothær, brother of Yarmarus
64. Siwald
65. Snio, son of Siwald
66. Byorn
67. Haraldus, son of Byorn
68. Gorm, son of Haraldus
69. Godric hin gyafmilde (the generous), called Godefrith, son of Gorm
70. Olaf called Gothdrankær, son of Godric
71. Hemming, son of Olaf. After him, there were two kings, Ring and Siwardus:
72. Ring, who ruled in Jutland
73. Siwardus, who ruled the islands
74. Reynær Lothbroki, son of Ring
75. Ynguar, son of Lothbroki
76. Siwardus. He was succeeded by two kings, Anulo and Sigæfridus:
77. Anulo
78. Sigæfridus
79. Haraldus and Reynfridum
80. Ericus, brother of Haraldus
81. Erik (or Ericus) Barn, possibly the son of Ericus
82. Olaf, King of Sweden
83. Gyurth, nephew of Olaf
84. Lothænæknut, son of Ericus Barn
85. Frothi, son of Lothænæknut
86. Gorm hin enskæ (the English), son of Frothi
87. Haraldus, son of Gorm
88. Gorm gamælæ (the old), son of Haraldus

=== Gesta Danorum på danskæ ===
The family tree of legendary Kings of the Danes, according to Gesta Danorum på danskæ (extract)

Kings of the Danes are marked with a crown (♕).

♕ Halfdan ♂	Ro ♂	Skat ♂	KEY
Marriage or coupling
♕ Ro or Halfdan ♂	♕ Helghe ♂	Thore ♀	Parent and child
Succession by other means
♕ A dog king ♂	Yrse ♀
♕ Snio ♂	♕ Rolf Krage ♂	Skulda ♀	♕ Hartwar ♂
Hodbrod ♂	Hadding's daughter ♀
♕ Hother ♂
♕ Rorik Slengeborre, also called Rake ♂	Rorik's sister ♀	Orwendel ♂	Feng ♂
King of Britain's daughter ♀	Amblothe ♂	Queen of Scotland ♀
♕ Wighlek ♂	Nanna ♀
♕ Wermund ♂
♕ Offe the Strong ♂

The source used for the genealogical information and name spellings is the English translation provided by Peter Tunstall.

Gesta Danorum på danskæ, a work separate from Saxo's Gesta Danorum, is the earliest surviving chronicle of Danish kings that was written in the Danish language (then Old Norse). It was written around the year 1300. It covers much of the same legendary and historical material as Chronicon Lethrense and Saxo's Gesta Danorum, but it is not a direct translation or abbreviation of either work, and includes material from both along with alterations that appear in neither. For example, the tale of the dog king of Denmark who precedes the reign of Rolf Kraki, and how Snyo won the throne after the dog's death, appears in Gesta Danorum på danskæ (in which it was put on the throne by Hakon) and the Chronicon Lethrense (in which it was put on the throne by Athisl), but not in Saxo's Gesta Danorum. However, the story of the mortal king Hother slaying divine Balder is included in Gesta Danorum på danskæ and Saxo's Gesta Danorum, but not in Chronicon Lethrense. In some cases, Gesta Danorum på danskæ incorporates information from both prior versions, even when these are incompatible. For example, when discussing the death of Hartwar after he overthrew Rolf Krage, Gesta Danorum på danskæ describes how he was killed by Rolf's retainer Wigge (echoing the version recounted in Gesta Danorum), but then says "Some say" it was Ake, brother of Hauborth, who killed Hartwar and became king (echoing the version recounted in Chronicon Lethrense). In another example, Chronicon Lethrense gives the brothers of Dan (eponymous progenitor of the Danes) as Nori (founder of Norway) and Østen (progenitor of the Swedes), and Gesta Danorum says his brother is Angul (progenitor of the Angles); Gesta Danorum på danskæ says that his brothers are Snøre, Høsten and Angul, effectively combining both previous accounts.

=== Codex Runicus ===
The family tree of legendary Kings of the Danes, according to the Kongetal section of Codex Runicus

Kings are marked with a crown (♕).

Uiþlef ᚢᛁᚦᛚᛅᚠ
KEY
♕ Værmund ᚡᛅᚱᛘᚢᚿᛑ	Marriage or coupling
Parent and child
♕ Uffi hin Starke (the Strong) ᚢᚠᚠᛁ
♕ Dan ᛑᛆᚿ	♕ Huþlef or Hughlek ᚼᚢᚦᛚᛅᚠ or ᚼᚢᚵᚼᛚᛅᚴ
♕ Froþe hin Storlætne ᚠᚱᚮᚦᛅ
♕ Dan hin Dahfulli ᛑᛆᚿ
♕ Friþlef ᚠᚱᛁᚦᛚᛅᚠ	Falka ᚠᛆᛚᚴᛆ
♕ Froþe hin Friþgoþe ᚠᚱᚮᚦᛅ	Ulvild ᚢᛚᚡᛁᛚᛑ
♕ Friþlef ᚠᚱᛁᚦᛚᛅᚠ	Eriþa ᛅᚱᛁᚦᛆ
♕ Froþe hin Harþe (the Hard) ᚠᚱᚮᚦᛅ
♕ Ingæld ᛁᚿᚵᛅᛚᛑ	Swærtæ ᛋᚡᛅᚱᛐᛅ
♕ Olaf ᚮᛚᛆᚠ
♕ Froþe hin Frøkne ᚠᚱᚮᚦᛅ	Allofþ ᛆᛚᛚᚮᚠᚦ
Þorilda ᚦᚮᚱᛁᛚᛑᛆ	♕ Haldan ᚼᛆᛚᛑᛆᚿ	♕ Hiþing hin Høueske (the Proper) ᚼᛁᚦᛁᚿᚵ	Hilda ᚼᛁᛚᛑᛆ

Name spellings are derived from the edited version of the text into Latin letters by Marita Akhøj Nielsen (2015) and runes are from the digitised manuscript Am 28 8vo at the University of Copenhagen.

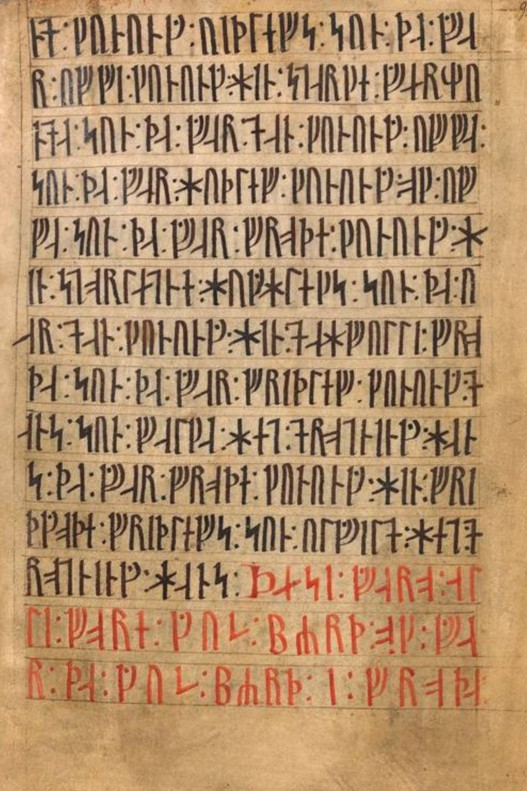
Leaf 92r of AM 28 8vo, known as Codex Runicus, a vellum manuscript from c. 1300 written entirely in runes. Leaf 92r contains the first half of Kongetal, listing the legendary kings of Denmark from Værmund to Froþe, and includes the start of a rubric placing Froþe's reign at the time of Christ.

The Codex Runicus is a codex written in Old Danish runes (specifically the Danish futhark with dotted runes). Most of the codex is a code of Scanian Law, but two sections near the end list Danish kings. These are known in modern Danish as Kongetal (King's List) and Runekrønike (Runic Chronicle). They were written by a different scribe than the one who wrote the law code (Hand 2 instead of Hand 1), likely to add legitimacy to the then-reigning royal family, and likely not before the year 1319 (judging by the reference to Eric VI Menved in the past tense at the end of Runekrønike).

==== Kongetal ====
Kongetal is a fragment of text, missing both its beginning and its ending. It begins partway through a line with the son of Uiþlef (likely Værmund, judging by the following line) and ends with Hiþing the Proper, the only king on this list who doesn't appear in any other list of Danish kings (not even the attached Runekrønike). This list is interrupted halfway through with a rubric that states God (i.e. Jesus) was born in the reign of Froþe hin friþgoþe. Each entry is brief, giving only the king's name, his father's name, and sometimes giving his epithet and queen.

The kings and queens listed in Kongetal are:

- Værmund (ᚡᛅᚱᛘᚢᚿᛑ), son of Uiþlef (ᚢᛁᚦᛚᛅᚠ)
- Uffi (ᚢᚠᚠᛁ) hin starke (the strong), son of Værmund
- Dan (ᛑᛆᚿ), son of Uffi
- Huþlef (ᚼᚢᚦᛚᛅᚠ) or Hughlek (ᚼᚢᚵᚼᛚᛅᚴ), also a son of Uffi
- Froþe (ᚠᚱᚮᚦᛅ) hin storlætne, son of Hughlek
- Dan (ᛑᛆᚿ) hin dahfulli, son of Froþe
- Friþlef (ᚠᚱᛁᚦᛚᛅᚠ), son of Dan. His queen was named Falka (ᚠᛆᛚᚴᛆ).
- Froþe (ᚠᚱᚮᚦᛅ) hin friþgoþe, son of Friþlef. His queen was named Ulvild (ᚢᛚᚡᛁᛚᛑ), and the chronicle says God (i.e. Jesus) was born in his reign.
- Friþlef (ᚠᚱᛁᚦᛚᛅᚠ), son of Froþe. His queen was named Eriþa (ᛅᚱᛁᚦᛆ).
- Froþe (ᚠᚱᚮᚦᛅ) hin harþe (the hard), son of Friþlef
- Ingæld (ᛁᚿᚵᛅᛚᛑ), son of Froþe. His queen was named Swærtæ (ᛋᚡᛅᚱᛐᛅ).
- Olaf (ᚮᛚᛆᚠ), son of Ingæld and Swærtæ
- Froþe (ᚠᚱᚮᚦᛅ) hin frøkne, son of Olaf. His queen was named Allofþ (ᛆᛚᛚᚮᚠᚦ)
- Haldan (ᚼᛆᛚᛑᛆᚿ), son of Froþe. His queen was named Þorilda (ᚦᚮᚱᛁᛚᛑᛆ).
- Hiþing (ᚼᛁᚦᛁᚿᚵ) hin høueske (the proper), son of Froþe. His queen was named Hilda (ᚼᛁᛚᛑᛆ).

==== Runekrønike ====
The family tree of legendary Kings of the Danes, according to the Runekrønike section of Codex Runicus

Kings are marked with a crown (♕).

♕ Hading ᚼᛆᛑᛁᚿᚵ
KEY
♕ Froþe ᚠᚱᚮᚦᛅ	Marriage or coupling
Parent and child
♕ Haldan ᚼᛆᛚᛑᛆᚿ	♕ Ro ᚱᚮ	♕ Hælhæ ᚼᛅᛚᚼᛅ	Succession by other or unclear means
♕ Rolf Krakæ ᚱᚮᛚᚠ:ᚴᚱᛆᚴᛅ	Þouhma ᚦᚮᚢᚼᛘᛆ
♕ Høþær ᚼᚯᚦᛅᚱ; King in Sweden	♕ Baldær ᛒᛆᛚᛑᛅᚱ; King in Zealand
♕ Roþrik ᚱᚮᚦᚱᛁᚴ	♕ Ambluþe ᛆᛘᛒᛚᚢᚦᛅ; King in Jutland	Uiþlek ᚢᛁᚦᛚᛅᚴ
♕ Uærmund ᚢᛅᚱᛘᚢᚿᛑ
♕ Uffi Starke (Strong) ᚢᚠᚠᛁ:ᛋᛐᛆᚱᚴᛅ
♕ Dan ᛑᛆᚿ	♕ Huhlek ᚼᚢᚼᛚᛅᚴ
♕ Froþe ᚠᚱᚮᚦᛅ
♕ Dan Dahfulli ᛑᛆᚿ:ᛑᛆᚼᚠᚢᛛᛚᛁ
♕ Friþlef ᚠᚱᛁᚦᛚᛅᚠ
♕ Froþe Friþgoþe ᚠᚱᚮᚦᛅ:ᚠᚱᛁᚦᚵᚮᚦᛅ
♕ Friþlef ᚠᚱᛁᚦᛚᛅᚠ
♕ Froþe ᚠᚱᚮᚦᛅ
♕ Inggiæld ᛁᚿᚵᚵᛁᛅᛚᛑ	Olaf ᚮᛚᛆᚠ
♕ Froþe ᚠᚱᚮᚦᛅ
♕ Haldan ᚼᛆᛚᛑᛆᚿ
sister of Siuald	♕ Siuald ᛋᛁᚢᛆᛚᛑ
♕ Guþriþ ᚵᚢᚦᚱᛁᚦ
♕ A dog king
♕ Haldan ᚼᛆᛚᛑᛆᚿ
♕ Harald Hilditan (Wartooth) ᚼᛆᚱᛆᛚᛑ:ᚼᛁᛚᛑᛁᛐᛆᚿ
♕ Olle ᚮᛚᛚᛅ
♕ Emundær ᛅᛘᚢᚿᛑᛅᚱ
♕ Sihar ᛋᛁᚼᛆᚱ	♕ Buþæl ᛒᚢᚦᛅᛛ
♕ Larmund ᛚᛆᚱᛘᚢᚿᛑ
♕ Snio ᛋᚿᛁᚮ
♕ Gøtrik ᚵᚯᛐᚱᛁᚴ
♕ Ræhinar Loþbroke ᚱᛅᚼᛁᚿᛆᚱ:ᛚᚮᚦᛒᚱᚮᚴᛅ
♕ Erek ᛅᚱᛅᚴ
♕ Lota Knut ᛚᚮᛐᛆ:ᚴᚿᚢᛐ
♕ Froþe ᚠᚱᚮᚦᛅ
♕ Gorm Ænske (the English) ᚵᚮᚱᛘ:ᛅᚿᛋᚴᛅ
♕ Gorm Gamble (the Old) ᚵᚮᚱᛘ:ᚵᛆᛘᛒᛚᛅ	Þyri ᚦᛦᚱᛁ

Name spellings are derived from the edited version of the text into Latin letters by S.S. Boeck (2015) and runes are from the digitised manuscript Am 28 8vo at the University of Copenhagen.

Runekrønike is longer than Kongetal, both in terms of the number of kings listed (its fragment starts earlier with Froþe son of Hading, and ends contemporary with the manuscript at the reign of Eric VI Menved) and in the detail given about their reigns. However, unlike the Kongetal, it names very few queens.

The Runekrønike is not wholly consistent with the Kongetal. Some names are spelled differently, for example Værmund (ᚡᛅᚱᛘᚢᚿᛑ) in the Kongetal is written Uærmund (ᚢᛅᚱᛘᚢᚿᛑ) in Runekrønike. It also excludes Olaf son of Inggiæld, skipping directly to Froþe son of Olaf, possibly because of a scribal error. Also, as mentioned above, the list of kings are different after Haldan son of Froþe: Kongetal says that Haldan is followed by his brother, the otherwise unknown Hiþing, whereas Runekrønike says that the kingship passed to Siwald.

The Runekrønike is heavily based on Saxo's Gesta Danorum (see above), although shorter, but it also deviates in some places. For example, while Saxo has Ro and Helge as the sons of Halfdan, the Runekrønike says instead that they are the sons of Halfdan's own father Froþe. While Saxo mentions the battle between Hother and the (believed) semi-divine Balder, the Runekrønike goes even further with euhemerisation by making Balder a rival king from Zealand, and calls him the son of Þouhma ("Þouhma" is the genitive spelling; the nominative could be different) instead of a son of Odin as in Saxo.

The Runekrønike also includes material from (and deviates from material in) other sources, including the Chronicon Lethrense. Although it mentions both the dog king (installed as the Danish king by the king of Sweden) and King Snio (Snow) from Chronicon Lethrense, Snio doesn't become king immediately after the dog king in the Runekrønike; instead, at least six other kings come between them.

The kings listed in Runekrønike, up to Gorm the Old, are:

1. Froþe (ᚠᚱᚮᚦᛅ), son of Hading (ᚼᛆᛑᛁᚿᚵ)
2. Haldan (ᚼᛆᛚᛑᛆᚿ), son of Froþe (ᚠᚱᚮᚦᛅ)
3. Ro (ᚱᚮ), son of Froþe (ᚠᚱᚮᚦᛅ), and his brother Hælhæ (ᚼᛅᛚᚼᛅ)
4. Rolf Krakæ (ᚱᚮᛚᚠ:ᚴᚱᛆᚴᛅ), son of Hælhæ (ᚼᛅᛚᚼᛅ)
5. Høþær (ᚼᚯᚦᛅᚱ), King in Sweden, and Baldær (ᛒᛆᛚᛑᛅᚱ), King in Zealand
6. Roþrik (ᚱᚮᚦᚱᛁᚴ), son of Høþær (ᚼᚯᚦᛅᚱ)
7. Ambluþe (ᛆᛘᛒᛚᚢᚦᛅ), King in Jutland
8. Uærmund (ᚢᛅᚱᛘᚢᚿᛑ), son of Uiþlek (ᚢᛁᚦᛚᛅᚴ)
9. Uffi Starke (the Strong) (ᚢᚠᚠᛁ:ᛋᛐᛆᚱᚴᛅ), son of Uærmund (ᚢᛅᚱᛘᚢᚿᛑ)
10. Dan (ᛑᛆᚿ) and Huhlek (ᚼᚢᚼᛚᛅᚴ), sons of Uffi (ᚢᚠᚠᛁ)
11. Froþe (ᚠᚱᚮᚦᛅ), son of Huhlek (ᚼᚢᚼᛚᛅᚴ)
12. Dan Dahfulli (ᛑᛆᚿ:ᛑᛆᚼᚠᚢᛛᛚᛁ), son of Froþe (ᚠᚱᚮᚦᛅ)
13. Friþlef (ᚠᚱᛁᚦᛚᛅᚠ), son of Dan (ᛑᛆᚿ)
14. Froþe Friþgoþe (ᚠᚱᚮᚦᛅ:ᚠᚱᛁᚦᚵᚮᚦᛅ), son of Friþlef (ᚠᚱᛁᚦᛚᛅᚠ)
15. Friþlef (ᚠᚱᛁᚦᛚᛅᚠ), son of Friþgoþe (ᚠᚱᛁᚦᚵᚮᚦᛅ)
16. Froþe (ᚠᚱᚮᚦᛅ), son of Friþlef (ᚠᚱᛁᚦᛚᛅᚠ)
17. Inggiæld (ᛁᚿᚵᚵᛁᛅᛚᛑ), son of Froþe (ᚠᚱᚮᚦᛅ)
18. Froþe (ᚠᚱᚮᚦᛅ), son of Olaf (ᚮᛚᛆᚠ)
19. Haldan (ᚼᛆᛚᛑᛆᚿ)
20. Siuald (ᛋᛁᚢᛆᛚᛑ)
21. Guþriþ (ᚵᚢᚦᚱᛁᚦ)
22. A dog king
23. Haldan (ᚼᛆᛚᛑᛆᚿ)
24. Harald Hilditan (Wartooth) (ᚼᛆᚱᛆᛚᛑ:ᚼᛁᛚᛑᛁᛐᛆᚿ)
25. Olle (ᚮᛚᛚᛅ)
26. Emundær (ᛅᛘᚢᚿᛑᛅᚱ), son of Olle (ᚮᛚᛚᛅ)
27. Sihar (ᛋᛁᚼᛆᚱ) and his brother Buþæl (ᛒᚢᚦᛅᛛ)
28. Larmund (ᛚᛆᚱᛘᚢᚿᛑ)
29. Snio (ᛋᚿᛁᚮ)
30. Gøtrik (ᚵᚯᛐᚱᛁᚴ)
31. Ræhinar Loþbroke (ᚱᛅᚼᛁᚿᛆᚱ:ᛚᚮᚦᛒᚱᚮᚴᛅ)
32. Erek (ᛅᚱᛅᚴ), the first in Denmark to be Christian
33. Lota Knut (ᛚᚮᛐᛆ:ᚴᚿᚢᛐ)
34. Froþe (ᚠᚱᚮᚦᛅ)
35. Gorm Ænske (the English) (ᚵᚮᚱᛘ:ᛅᚿᛋᚴᛅ)
36. Gorm Gamble (the Old) (ᚵᚮᚱᛘ:ᚵᛆᛘᛒᛚᛅ)

== Anglo-Saxon sources ==
=== Beowulf ===
Family tree of the Scyldings (Kings of the Danes), Heathobards and Scylfings (Kings of the Swedes), according to Beowulf

♕ Heremod
♕ Scyld Scefing
♕ Beowulf
♕ Healfdene	♕ Ongentheow
♕ Heorogar	♕ Hrothgar	Wealhtheow	Halga	A daughter	♕ Onela	♕ Ohthere
Heoroweard	Hrethric	Hrothmund	Hrothulf	Froda	Eanmund	Eadgils
Freawaru	Ingeld

The Old English epic poem Beowulf mentions several Danish kings who are members of the Scylding clan (that is, they are descended from Scyld). The most notable Danish king in the poem is Hroðgar, whose hall Heorot is the main setting of the tale. Characters identified as kings of the Danes in the text include:

1. Ecgwela, a predecessor to Heremod, presumably a king. The Scyldings are called his offspring.
2. Heremod, who slew many of his own people and was exiled and killed
3. Scyld, a foundling who became king
4. Beowulf, son of Scyld. This Beowulf is unrelated to the title character of the poem, and is known by other names in other sources (e.g. Beowa or Beaw)
5. Healfdene, son of Beowa
6. Heorogar, son of Healfdene
7. Hroðgar, son of Healfdene

Several other characters, members of the same family, are not referred to explicitly as Kings in Beowulf but have been identified with kings in other traditions. These include:

- Halga, youngest son of Healfdene and brother of Hroðgar
- Hroðulf, Hroðgar's nephew and thus probably the son of Halga. Hroðulf is identified with Rolf Krage/Hrólfr Kraki in other traditions. Scholars say that the poem foreshadows Hroðulf's ascension to the throne after the events of the poem, by killing his cousins Hreðric and Hroðmund.
- Heoroweard, son of Heorogar. Heoroweard is identified with Hiartuar/Hjörvarðr, who overthrew Rolf Krage in other traditions
- Hreðric, son of Hroðgar, who is identified with Hrœrekr Ringslinger by scholars such as Axel Olrik

Beowulf also refers to a rival family of rulers called the Heaðobards, who are not kings of Denmark in this work but are depicted as kings of Denmark when they appear in later surviving works from the continent. These are:

- Froda, who killed or was killed by Healfdene
- Ingeld, Froda's son, who married Hroðgar's daughter Freawaru in an attempt to settle the feud between their families, but would turn against Hroðgar after the events of the poem

Lastly, Hygelac, who is King of the Geats in the poem and liege lord of the protagonist Beowulf, has been connected with the Danish king Chlochilaicus or Chochilaicus, who appears in History of the Franks by Gregory of Tours (see below) and the Liber Historiae Francorum, based partly on shared stories of leading a raid into the Frankish Kingdoms. Hygelac has also been connected to Huglecus or Hugleik, a Danish king from the Gesta Danorum by Saxo Grammaticus (see above).

=== The Life of Willibrord ===
The Vita Willibrordi archiepiscopi Traiectensis, or The Life of Willibrord, Archbishop of Utrecht, is a late 8th century hagiography of Willibrord, written by the Northumbrian scholar Alcuin. This work relates how Willibrord became a missionary to the Danes and met their ruler, Ongendus, described as "a man more savage than any wild beast and harder than stone".

=== Widsith ===
Widsith is an Old English poem that survives in the 10th century Exeter Book, but may significantly predate it. The first of three thulas in the poem presents a list of kings, the most notable example of a king from each of several tribes. The thula says that Alewih was known as king of the Danes, and describes him as the bravest of all men listed but that he was defeated by Offa, ruler of the Angles. The thula also lists Sigehere as ruler of the "Sea-Danes".

Widsith also mentions Hroðulf ("Hroþwulf") and Hroðgar as an uncle and nephew who held the longest peace together, and Ingeld as a Heaðobard Viking ("wicinga cynn") whom they defeated at Heorot. None of these three are explicitly mentioned as Danish in Widsith, but appear as Danish in other works (see the section on Beowulf, above).

== Icelandic sources ==
Danish royal history were significant influences on Icelandic writing and poetry in the 12th century, perhaps because of the influence of Lund (then part of Denmark) on the education of Icelanders at the time. (Lund was the archiepiscopal seat for Iceland until 1153.) Many surviving Icelandic works are influenced by, or wholly based on, a lost work called Skjöldunga saga, a kings' saga about the Skjöldung family of Danish kings, which was written in the late 12th century (c. 1180–1200).

=== Gróttasöngr ===
Gróttasöngr ("Grótti's song") is an Eddic poem that survives only in certain manuscripts of Snorri Sturluson's Prose Edda, and as such is not always included in the Poetic Edda. It most likely dates from the early 12th century, perhaps shortly before 1140.

The song is sung by two slave-girls, Fenja and Menja, who later identify themselves as the kin of bergrisi (jötnar). They are the slaves of King Fróði, son of Friðleifr. The poem itself does not specify that these men were kings of Denmark, but Snorri's prose introduction to the poem (in Skáldskaparmál) says that Friðleifr was the son of Skjöldr (himself a son of Odin), whose lands "were in what is now [i.e. in Snorri's time] called Denmark, but was then known as Gotland". The prose introduction also says that Fróði's reign coincided with the reign of Caesar Augustus and the birth of Christ; in Scandinavia, the resulting peace was ascribed to Fróði and known as Fróði's Peace.

A later stanza of Gróttasöngr prophesies that "Yrsa's son" (identified in other works as Hrólfr Kraki) would take vengeance on Fróði for the killing of Hálfdan (or, as plural, the half-Danes). (Halfdan is the name of several Danish kings in other sources.)

- Skjöldr
- Friðleifr
- Fróði

=== Ynglinga saga ===
Ynglinga saga is a Kings' saga written around 1225 by Snorri Sturluson (1179–1241). Ynglinga saga is the first saga in Heimskringla, an extensive history of Swedish and Norwegian kings, focused on the Yngling family of legendary Swedish kings and their descent from the euhemerised Odin. While the main focus of Ynglinga saga is on the kings of Sweden, several Danish kings are also mentioned, and Ynglinga saga explicitly references Skjöldunga saga as a source for its treatment of these. Because the Danish kings are not the focus of the work, the genealogy of kings is incomplete and some generations are not accounted for.

The kings of Denmark mentioned in Ynglinga saga are:

- Friðfróði, aka Fróði, who ruled in Lejre and in whose home Fjölnir drowned in mead
- Dan hinn mikilláti (the haughty), brother of Queen Drótt, who was daughter of King Danp (implying that Danr is Danp's son also)
- Fróði hinn mikilláti (the haughty), or hinn friðsami (peace-loving), son of Dan
- Hálfdan and Friðleifr, Fróði's sons. Hálfdan conquered Sweden from King Aun and ruled it for 25 years before dying in his bed.
- Áli hinn frækni (the bold), son of Friðleifr. Áli conquered Sweden from King Aun 25 years after Hálfdan's death, and ruled it for another 25 years before being killed by Starkad the Old.
- Fróði hinn frækni (the bold)
- Helgi, son of Hálfdan
- Hrólfr kraki, Helgi's son with Yrsa
- Ívarr víðfaðmi, who conquered all of Sweden, Denmark, and the East lands (Austrríki), as well as much of Saxland and a fifth of England

In addition, some individuals are mentioned that appear as kings of Denmark in other versions. Skjöldr is mentioned as a son of Odin who married Gefjon and lived with her at Lejre, but he isn't called a king and the relationship between him and later kings isn't explicit. The Fróða friðr, often known in English as "Fróði's Peace" and attributed to the reign of the Danish king Friðfróði is instead said to take place a generation earlier during the reign of the euhemerised Freyr in Sweden.

=== Sögubrot ===
The family tree of legendary Kings of the Danes, according to Sögubrot af nokkrum fornkonungum

Kings of the Danes are marked with a crown (♕).

Halfdan the Brave ♂
KEY
♕ Ivar Wide-Grip ♂	Alf the Old ♂	Marriage or coupling
Parent and child
♕ Helgi ♂	♕ Hroerek ♂	Aud the Deep-Minded ♀	Radbard, King of Gardariki ♂	Unclear or distant succession
wife of Harald ♀	♕ Harald Wartooth ♂	father of Sigurd Hring ♂	King Alf or Gandalf, of Alfheimar ♂
Hroerek Ring-Slinger ♂	Thrand the Old ♂	♕ Sigurd Hring ♂	Alfhild ♀
Ragnar ♂

The source used for the genealogical information and name spellings is the English translation by Peter Tunstall.

Sögubrot af nokkurum fornkonungum í Dana- ok Svíaveldi ("Fragment of a Saga about Certain Early Kings in Denmark and Sweden", often abbreviated to Sögubrot) is a fragment of an Old Icelandic legendary saga, believed to be a part of a younger redaction (written around 1250 by Óláfr Þórðarson) of the Skjöldunga saga. The fragment begins in the middle of a discussion between the Scanian king Ivar Vidfamne and his daughter Auðr, and continues to the reign of Auðr's son Harald Wartooth, where it breaks off because of missing pages. It resumes at the end of Harald's reign, recounting the Battle of Brávellir and the reign of Sigurd Hring.

Kings of Denmark, or of individual Danish regions, who appear in Sögubrot include:

1. Helgi (also referred to as Helgi inn hvassi, "Helgi the Sharp"), brother of Hrærekr; co-king of Zealand with his brother
2. Hrærekr, brother of Helgi and husband of Auðr; co-king of Zealand with his brother (a separate Hrærekr Ringslinger is named as his grandson)
3. Ivar Vidfamne, father of Auðr; king in Sweden, who becomes king of Zealand also after turning Helgi and Hrærekr against each other; also ruled Jutland and parts of England that Halfdan the Brave had previously ruled (Northumbria)
4. Harald Wartooth, son of Hrærekr and Auðr; he became king after Ivar and came to rule all of Denmark (Zealand, Jutland, Scania) and Sweden, parts of England (Northumbria), and Gautland
5. Sigurd Hring, nephew of Harald Wartooth; initially made ruler of Sweden and West Gautland by Harald, then became king of Denmark and Sweden after Harald's death, but lost Northumbria to Adalbrikt; he is known almost exclusively as King Hring until he succeeds Harald, when he starts being called Sigurd Hring without explanation

The character of Heid, who became queen after the Battle of Brávellir according to Chronicon Lethrense, is mentioned in Sögubrot but only as a shield-maiden in Harald's army. Ragnarr is named as a son of Sigurd Hring with his wife Alfhild of Álfheimr; although he does not become king before the fragment cuts off, this is a reference to Ragnar Lodbrok. Halfdan the Valiant, Gudrod and Ingjald are mentioned in passing as having preceded Ivar Vidfamne, but their relationship to him and what lands they may have ruled in Denmark or Sweden are not explicit (it is only mentioned that Halfdan ruled in Northumbria).

=== Resen manuscript ===
The family tree of the Skjǫldungs (legendary Kings of the Danes), according to the genealogies of the Resen manuscript

Odinn ♂
KEY
Sciauldr ♂	Marriage or coupling
Parent and child
Fridleif ♂
Friðfroði
Friðleifr
Havarr handrame
Fróði
Varmundr vitri
Olafr litillati
Danr mikilati
Froði friðsami
Friðleifr
Froði enn fręcni
Ingialdr	Halfdan
Helgi	Hroarr
Hrolfr kraci	Valldarr milldi
Hręrecr hnoggvanbaugi	Haralldr
Froði	Halfdan snialli
Halfdan	Ivarr viðfaðmi
Hręrecr Sløngvanbaugi	Auðr diupuðga	Radbardr
Haralldr hillditǫnn	Randver
Sigurðr hringr
Ragnarr loðbroc
Sigurðr ormr i auga
Haurða knutr
Gormr gamli
Haralldr
Sveinn tiugu sceg
Knutr riki

The source used for the genealogical information and name spellings is the edition provided by Anthony Faulkes.

There is a collection of regnal lists and genealogies in the manuscript called AM 1 e β II fol., 85v–91r, which is a copy made by Árni Magnússon of three pages of a vellum manuscript belonging to the Danish scholar P. H. Resen (1625–88). The vellum manuscript was written around 1254, but destroyed in the Copenhagen Fire of 1728, and only Árni Magnússon's copy remains. The compilation as a whole is the oldest one of its kind to survive from medieval Iceland (though only recorded in a late copy). One of the three lists on the second page is a genealogy of the Skjöldungs, which was presumably derived either from Skjöldunga saga or from a written genealogy also used by the author of the saga.

The list (excluding the progenitor Odin), is as follows (note that some individuals appear more than once):

1. Sciavldr, Odinn's son
2. Fridleif, his son
3. Friðfroði, his son
4. Friðleifr, his son
5. Havarr handrame, his son
6. Froði, his son
7. Varmundr vitri, his son
8. Olafr litillati, his son
9. Danr mikilati, after whom Denmark was named
10. Froði friðsami, his son
11. Friðleifr, his son
12. Froði enn fręcni, his son
13. Ingialdr, his son and foster-son of Starcaðar
14. Halfdan, his brother
15. Helgi and Hroarr, his sons
16. Hrolfr kraci, Helgi's son
17. Hręrecr hnoggvanbavgi, Ingiall's son and foster-son of Starcadar
18. Froði, his son
19. Halfdan, his son
20. Hręrecr Sløngvanbavgi, his son
21. Haralldr Hilldi tavnn, his son
22. Sigurðr hringr.
23. Ragnarr loðbroc, his son
24. Sigurðr ormr i avga, his son
25. Havrða knutr, his son
26. Gormr gamli, his son
27. Haralldr, his son
28. Sveinn tivgv sceg, his son
29. Knvtr riki, his son
30. Valldarr milldi, Hroar's son
31. Haralldr, his son
32. Halfdan snialli, his son
33. Ivarr viðfaðmi, his son
34. Avðr divpvðga, his daughter
35. Haralldr hillditǫnn, her son
36. Randver, Radbardr's son
37. Sigurð hringr, his son

=== Ragnarssona þáttr ===
The family tree of legendary Kings of Denmark, Sweden and Norway, according to Ragnarssona þáttr

Kings are marked with a crown (♕).

♕ Dag ♂	Thora Mother-of-Drengs ♀
Herraud ♂	♕ Hring ♂	Sigurd Fafnir's Bane ♂	Brynhild Budli's daughter ♀	♕ Hring ♂
KEY
Thora Hart-of-the-Town ♀	♕ Ragnar ♂	Aslaug, aka Randalin ♀	♕ Ingi ♂	Marriage or coupling
Parent and child
Eirik ♂	Agnar ♂	♕ Ingjald ♂
Yngvar ♂	Husto ♂	♕ Ella of Northumbria ♂	♕ Hring ♂
♕ Ivar the Boneless ♂	♕ Bjorn Ironside ♂	♕ Hvitserk ♂	♕ Sigurd Snake-in-the-Eye ♂	Blaeja ♀	♕ Olaf ♂
♕ Knut, aka Horda-Knut ♂	♕ Klakk-Harald ♂	Aslaug ♀	Helgi Hvassi ♂	♕ Gudrod ♂	♕ Frodi ♂
♕ Gorm ♂	Thyra, Denmark's Saviour ♀	Ingibjorg ♀	♕ Sigurd Hart ♂
Knut, the Love of the Danes ♂	♕ Harald ♂	Gudthorm ♂	Ragnhild ♀	♕ Halfdan the Black ♂
♕ Harald Fairhair ♂

The source used for the genealogical information and name spellings is the English translation by Peter Tunstall.

Ragnarssona þáttr ("The Yarn of Ragnar's Sons") is a þáttr (a short story, literally a strand of rope or yarn) about Ragnar Lodbrok and his descendants, who became kings in several lands in Scandinavia. Its sources include the lost Skjöldunga saga and a version of Ragnars saga, either the surviving Ragnars saga loðbrókar or another that has been lost. Ragnarssona þáttr was probably composed by Haukr Erlendsson, and is preserved in his hand in the Hauksbók manuscript, which has been dated to between 1302 and 1310.

Ragnarssona þáttr tells how King Ragnar (referred to only once in the tale as "Loðbrók") became king of Sweden and Denmark after the death of his father, King Hring. Ragnar had two sons by his first wife Thora Hart-of-the-Town, who were Eirik and Agnar, and four sons by his second wife Aslaug or Randalin, who were Ivar the Boneless, Bjorn Ironside, Hvitserk, and Sigurd Snake-in-the-Eye. In Denmark, the genealogy continues through Sigurd to Harald Bluetooth. The tale ends with Harald Fairhair becoming the first ruler of a united Norway.

Kings of Denmark or its constituent kingdoms mentioned in Ragnarssona þáttr are:

- Hring, from whom Ragnar inherited Denmark and Sweden
- Ragnar, son of Hring. He ruled in Denmark and Sweden
- Ivar the Boneless, eldest and leader of the sons of Ragnar by Aslaug, who conquered Zealand, Reidgotaland, Gotland, and Öland and all the smaller islands in the sea during Ragnar's life, leading to conflict between them. After Ragnar's death, he instead became king of Northumbria and his brothers took the lands on the continent.
- Sigurd Snake-in-the-Eye, youngest son of Ragnar by Aslaug, who after Ragnar's death came to rule Zealand, Scania, Halland, Oslo Fjord, and Agder as far as Lindesnes and a good portion of the Norwegian Uplands
- Knut, aka Horda-Knut, who succeeded his father in Zealand, Scania and Halland, but Oslo Fjord broke away from his rule.
- Klakk-Harald, King of Jutland, father-in-law of Gorm
- Gorm, son of Knut, who governed the lands of Ragnar's sons while they were away at war, and later became king after the death of Knut. He also inherited Jutland from his step-father Klakk-Harald
- Harald, son of Gorm. He ruled in Denmark.

=== Óláfs saga Tryggvasonar en mesta ===
Óláfs saga Tryggvasonar en mesta ("The Greatest Saga of Olaf Tryggvason") is a saga compiled from numerous other sources, likely in the second quarter of the 14th century. It was modelled on the Óláfs saga helga from Snorri Sturluson's Heimskringla, but focused on an earlier king Olaf, namely Olaf Tryggvason, a King of Norway from the end of the 10th century most famous for converting Norway to Christianity.

The core sources used are Snorri's Heimskringla, particularly Snorri's version of Óláfs saga Tryggvasonar but also Ynglinga saga (see above), Hálfdanar saga svarta, Haralds saga hárfagra and Óláfs saga helga. This is used as a framework into which material has been added from several other sagas and other tales, including Hallfreðar saga, Færeyinga saga, Grænlendinga saga, Laxdæla saga, Landnamabok and Kristni saga.

As well as the life of Olaf Tryggvason, drawn from sources including Óláfs saga Tryggvasonar from Heimskringla, the mesta saga also tells the story of Olaf's ancestors and predecessors, in particular the Danish kings leading up to Harald Bluetooth (aka Harald Gormsson), who was king of Norway before Olaf's accession. Some of these details are from Heimskringla, particularly of kings descended from Ragnar Lodbrok mentioned in the first chapters of the work, but a later section beginning at chapter 60 tells of kings before Ragnar, and is more consistent with the kings identified by Adam of Bremen than with those listed by Snorri. Also mentioned, briefly during the story of Gorm, is king Gnupa, described as the king of Jutland that Gorm defeated as part of his unification of Denmark.

Legendary kings of Denmark, or constituent kingdoms of Denmark (generally Jutland where specified), mentioned in Óláfs saga Tryggvasonar en mesta, include (in the order first mentioned as king, with chapter references in square brackets):

- Gorm, King of Denmark [1, 62]
- Eric, King of Jutland, father of Ragnhild the Great [2]
- Harold Gormson, King of Denmark [19]
- Godefrid, King in Jutland when Charlemagne reigned [60]
- Hemming, Godefrid's brother's son, who made peace with Charlemagne at the river Egda [60]
- Sigfrod and Ring Anulo, who contended for sovereignty of Jutland [60]
- Harold, who was baptised after winning a battle against Reinfrid, son of Godefrid [60] (a separate figure, Clack-Harold, is called the Earl of Jutland [1] and [62])
- Harek, Harold's brother's son, who had been baptised with him. Harek ruled Jutland until 862, when he warred against his brother's son, Guthorm, and both died along with the whole royal family except Harek [60]
- Harek, the sole royal survivor of Harek's war with Guthorm. Baptised by Bishop Anscarius, but Harek rejected Christianity after Anscarius' death. [60]
- Sigfrod and Halfdan, heathen kings after Harek. Sigfrod, or another Danish King of the same name, along with King Gudfrod and the sons of Ragnar Lodbrok, fought with the Frankish emperors until their defeat by Arnaldus (possibly Arnulf) around the year 900 [60]
  - Gudfrod, mentioned as part of the host with Sigfrod [60]
- Frodi, King in Jutland twelve years after the defeat of the Danish host by the Franks, baptised by Biship Huno [60]
- Helgi, who succeeded Sigfrod and Halfdan, but was slain in a battle against Olaf, King of the Swedes, who then ruled Denmark [60]
- Olaf, who ruled a long time over Denmark and Sweden after defeating Helgi, and died a natural death [60]
- Gyrd and Knut, who succeeded Olaf in Denmark [60]
- Siggeir, who succeeded Gyrd and Knut [60]
- Sigurd Ring, father of Ragnar Lodbrok. Sigurd Ring ruled the empire of the Swedes and the Danes, and later conquered Northimbraland [61]
- Olaf the Englishman, who was king of Northimbraland appointed by Sigurd Ring, then after being forced out he was made ruler of Jutland as a tributary under Sigurd Ring and later Ragnar Lodbrok [61]
- Ragnar Lodbrok [61]
- Grim the Gray, son of Olaf and tributary king of Jutland [61]
- Audulf the Strong, son of Grim and tributary king of Jutland under Ragnar Lodbrok [61]
- Gorm the Foolish, son of Audulf and tributary king of Jutland [61]
- Knut the Foundling aka Thrall-Knut, foster son of Gorm the Foolish. Before Gorm died, he caused Knut to be made King over the realm he held in Jutland [61]
- Gorm, son of Knut. He reigned subject to the sons of Ragnar Lodbrok, and was regarded with special favour by Sigurd Snake i'th'eye [61]
- Sigurd Snake i'th'eye, ruler of Zealand and Skaney [62]
- Horda-Knut, son of Sigurd Snake i'th'eye and Blœia (daughter of King Ella), and foster-son of King Gorm. He inherited Zealand and Skaney from Sigurd. Father of Gorm the Old [62]
- Gnupa, a king in Reidgotaland, now called Jutland, defeated by Gorm the Old [62]
- Silfrascall, another king in Jutland defeated by Gorm the Old [62]

=== Hrólfs saga kraka ===
The family tree of legendary Kings of the Danes, according to Hrólfs saga kraka

Kings of the Danes are marked with a crown (♕).

Sigríðr ♀	♕ Hálfdan ♂	♕ Fróði ♂	KEY
Marriage or coupling
Sævil jarl ♂	Signý ♀	Norðri, a King in England ♂	Ólöf, Queen of Saxland ♀	Parent and child
Hrókr ♂	Ögn ♀	♕ Hróarr ♂	♕ Helgi ♂	Yrsa ♀	Aðils, King of Sweden ♂	King of the Finns ♂	Ingibjörg ♀
Agnarr ♂	An elf-woman ♀	King Hring ♂	Hvít ♀
Hjörvarðr, a king ♂	♕ Skuld ♀	♕ Hrólfr Kraki ♂	Björn ♂	Bera, a farmer's daughter ♀
♕ Skúr ♀	♕ Drífa ♀	Böðvarr ♂	Elg-Fróði ♂	Þórir Houndsfoot ♂

The source used for the genealogical information is the English translation by Peter Tunstall, and spellings are from the Old Norse edition edited by Guðni Jónsson.

Hrólfs saga kraka ok kappa hans ("The Saga of Hrolf Kraki and His Champions") is a late legendary saga that tells the story of Hrólfr Kraki, including information about his family, the Skjöldungs (Kings of Denmark). It was composed in its surviving form by the year 1400.

The saga begins with the brothers Halfdan and Fróði, who are called Skjöldungs and the sons of kings, but whose parentage is never given. After Fróði overthrows Halfdan, he is overthrown in turn by the brothers Hróarr and Helgi. They are jointly considered kings, but Helgi rules Denmark while Hróarr travels to Northumbria and later becomes king there, trading his claim over Denmark for a fine ring from Helgi (possession of which leads to strife with their nephew Hrókr, a version of Hrœrekr Ringslinger). Hrólfr Kraki is, again, Helgi's son by incest, and comes to rule Denmark after Helgi's death. When Hrólfr himself is defeated by the forces of his half-sister Skuld and her husband King Hjörvarðr, it is Skuld (not Hjörvarðr as in other sources) who takes control of the kingdom; when she is deposed in turn, the land comes under the rule of Hrólfr's daughters Skúr and Drífa.

Kings and regnant queens of Denmark identified in Hrólfs saga kraka are:

1. Hálfdan
2. Fróði, brother of Hálfdan
3. Hróarr and Helgi, sons of Hálfdan
4. Hrólfr Kraki, son of Helgi
5. Skuld, daughter of Helgi, with her husband Hjörvarðr
6. Skúr and Drífa, daughters of Hrólfr Kraki

=== Arngrímur Jónsson ===
The most complete surviving source for the content of the Skjöldunga saga (which probably dated to the end of the twelfth century) is a Latin rendering by the Icelandic historian Arngrímur Jónsson (1568–1648) in his Rerum Danicarum fragmenta (Fragments of Danish history) from 1596. (The saga manuscript that Arngrímur Jónsson used as his source was lost in the 17th century.)

Opinions differ on Arngrímur's treatment of Skjöldunga saga. For example, Olrik and Jakob Benediktsson saw his text as an abbreviation of the original Skjǫldunga saga, whereas Bjarni Guðnason argued that his work should be seen as a retelling rather than an abbreviation. Jonas Wellendorf points out that parts of Arngrímur's work, including the opening paragraph, actively comment on other works (including Gesta Danorum by Saxo Grammaticus, see above) in Arngrímur's own voice, and therefore Rerum Danicarum fragmenta as a whole cannot be merely a translation or retelling, as it includes Arngrímur's commentary.

- Scioldus
- Fridleifus I
- Frodo I
- Herleifus
- Havardus
- Leifus
- Herleifus
- Hunleifus
- Aleifus
- Oddleifus
- Geirleifus
- Gunnleifus
- Frodo II
- Vermundus
- Dan I
- Dan II
- Frodo III
- Fridleifus II
- Frodo IV
- Ingjaldus
- Helgo and Roas
- Rolfo Krake
- Hiorvardus
- Rærecus

== Frankish sources ==
=== Histories of the Franks ===
The 6th century historian Gregory of Tours, in Book 3 of his Historia Francorum ("History of the Franks"), refers to a Danish king named Chlochilaicus, who led a raid into the Frankish Kingdoms during the reign of Theodericus I (511 to 534), and was killed in the counter-attack by Theodericus' son, Theodebertus. The 8th century Liber Historiae Francorum tells the same story, referring to the Danish King as Chochilaicus. (The same story also appears in the 7th or 8th century Liber Monstrorum and in the poem Beowulf, but in these works the raiding Viking king is named Hygelac, and described as King of the Geats rather than King of the Danes.)

=== Royal Frankish Annals ===
The Royal Frankish Annals are a series of Latin annals of the Carolingian dynasty year-by-year between 741 and 829. Several annals refer to kings of the Danes, as follows:

1. Sigfred ("Sigifrid"): In 782, King Sigfred sends a group of "Nordmanni", Halptani and his companions, to a synod held by Charlemagne. (Sigfred is not explicitly referred to as a king of the Danes in this work, but the others mentioned are.)
2. Gudfred ("Godofrid"): Gudfred was mentioned as King of the Danes in the annals of 804, 808, 809, and 810. His reign was characterised by a worsening relationship and finally conflict with Charlemagne's Franks. Gudfred was killed by one of his own companions in 810.
3. Hemming: Hemming was the son of Gudfred's brother, and became king in 810. He made peace with Charlemagne in 811. In 812, he was found dead.
4. Sigfred ("Sigifrid") and Anulo: Two rival claimants to the Danish throne in 812, Sigfred was a nephew of Gudfred and Anulo was a nephew of Harald ("Heriold"). Neither succeeded to the throne as both were killed in combat, but Anulo's faction won and the throne passed to his brothers Harald and Reginfrid.
5. Reginfrid: Reginfrid was co-king of Denmark with his brother Harald from 812. They petitioned the Emperor (Louis the Pious) to return their brother Hemming, but after he was returned in 813 they were attacked by Danish forces of the sons of Gudfred and forced into exile. In 814 they returned to retake the kingdom, but Reginfrid was killed.
6. Harald ("Hariold"): Harald initially ruled with his brother Reginfrid from 812. After being forced out of Denmark, and the death of his brother in 814, Harald sought refuge and support from the Emperor. He continued to harry his rivals, the sons of Gudfred, and in 817 they contacted the Emperor offering peace in exchange for Harald; the Emperor refused. The Emperor helped him retake Denmark in 819 (two sons of Gudfred defected to him). He remained in conflict with them as mentioned in 821, 822 and 823. In 826, he was baptised as a Christian in St. Alban's. He was forced out of the country in 827.
7. Horik ("Hohric"): One of the sons of Gudfred who took control of Denmark in 813 and battled with Harald for it until 827, Horik is only mentioned in the annal for 827, before the annals conclude in 829.

=== Vita Karoli Magni ===
Vita Karoli Magni ("The Life of Charlemagne") is a biography of Charlemagne, King of the Franks, written by Einhard in the first half of the 9th century, with dates of composition suggested between 817 and 833. Sections 14 and 32 refer to the Danes and in particular their king Gudfred ("Godofridus"), against whom Charlemagne waged the last war he ever fought. Gudfred considered Frisia and Saxony his provinces, had made the Abodriti into his tributaries, and boasted that he would attack the Franks in Aix. However, he was killed by one of his own followers before this could happen.

=== Gesta Hludowici imperatoris ===
Gesta Hludowici imperatoris is a history of Holy Roman Emperor Louis the Pious by Thegan of Trier, written in Latin shortly before Louis' death in AD 840. In section 33, it says Harald Klak ("Heriolt") came to Louis from the Danes and was "elevated from the sacred baptismal font" (i.e. baptised as Christian) by the Emperor, while his wife was raised by the Empress Judith. Louis gave Harald a large part of Frisia.

=== Vita Ansgarii ===
Vita Ansgarii is a 9th-century hagiography of saint Ansgar, written by the East Frankish archbishop Rimbert. Vita Ansgarii mentions three Danish kings:

1. Harald (in chapters VII, VIII, IX and X; mentioned only as ruler of some of the Danes),
2. Horic the elder (in chapters XXIV, XXVI and XXXI), and
3. Horic the younger (in chapters XXXI and XXXII).

Harald was driven from Denmark and taken in by Louis the Pious, where he and many of his household were baptised as Christians. Both kings Horic were pagan, but they had good relations with Ansgar and permitted the worship and preaching of Christianity in Denmark (although when the younger Horic first took power, a certain headman had urged him to persecute the Christians).

=== Annales Fuldenses ===
The Annales Fuldenses, or Annals of Fulda, are 9th century East Frankish chronicles up to the year 901. Up to 830, they are a compilation that draws on earlier materials, especially the Royal Frankish Annals (see above) and the Annals of Lorsch, but after that the annals consist of information not found in any known sources. Several kings of Denmark are mentioned, including:

- Harald Klak ("Hariold"): Mentioned in the 852 entry as having previously "fled the anger" of Horic, king of the Danes, and having been Christianised, and being killed as a potential traitor by his countrymen.
- Horik I ("Horic"): Mentioned in 852. In 854, he fought a civil war against his brother's son, Gudurm, in which he and both factions of the royal family perished, except for one boy (likely, but not explicitly, Horic the Child).
- Horik II ("Horic"): Ceded land between the sea and the Eider to Rorik of Dorestad in 857.
- Sigfred ("Sigifrid" and "Siegfried"): Attended a peace conference near Worms in 873, which his brother Halfdan ("Halbden") followed up on by messenger. In 882, Sigifrid and the emperor were at war; the kings of the Northmen, Sigifrid and Godafrid, and the princes, Wurm and Hals, were besieged by the Franks, but Sigifrid and Emperor Charles made peace and parted as friends, with gifts. (Note: Translator Timothy Reuter suggested that the identification of Sigifrid as the king to make peace with the emperor may have been a scribal error, and that from context it is more likely to have been Godafrid.) In 886, Sigifrid brought a host of Northmen to reinforce Northmen who war warring with the Franks. In 891, a battle was fought between the Danes and Franks, which the Franks won and led to the deaths of Sigifrid and Godafrid (although the chronicle says that Godafrid had already been killed in 885).

Although not a king, the Danish viking leader Rorik of Dorestad is prominently mentioned a few times, including in the entry for 850 (along with his brother Harald and the dux of the Northmen, Godafrid), 857, and 873. Rorik ruled land in Frisia that was later granted in 882 to Godafrid, who was referred to as a king of the Northmen alongside Sigifrid, and who was killed in 885, then apparently killed again at the Battle of Leuven in 891.

== Other sources ==
=== Widukind of Corvey ===
In The Deeds of the Saxons ("Res gestae Saxonicae") by Widukind of Corvey, a 10th century Saxon chronicler, two different kings of the Danes are mentioned.

In Book 1, chapter 40, Widukind describes how Henry the Fowler defeated the Danes and had their king, Knuba receive baptism. In Book 3, chapters 64 and 65, he recounts that the Danish king Harald became Christian after challenging the faith of the bishop Poppo.

=== Geoffrey of Monmouth ===
Book III of the 12th century Historia Regum Britanniae by Geoffrey of Monmouth refers to a King of the Dacians named Guichtlac. As mentioned above in the section on Chronicon Lethrense, the Danes and Dacians had been conflated by European historians since at least the works of Dudo of Saint-Quentin over a century earlier. In Geoffrey's tale, Guichtlac had been in love with the daughter of Elsingius the King of Norway, but instead she married Brennius, then King of Northumberland and the brother and rival of Belinus, King of the Britons. After a sea battle, Guichtlac and the lady were washed up in Britain and captured by Belinus. After Brennius defeated Belinus in battle and became King of the Britons, Guichtlac promised to submit Dacia (Denmark) to Brennius and pay yearly tribute if he was given leave to return to Dacia with his mistress, which was granted.

== Multiple sources ==
Many kings are mentioned by multiple sources, but are for various reasons still considered more legendary than historical kings of Denmark

=== Early legendary kings (Scyldings/Skjoldungs) ===
- ♕ indicates that the person is explicitly identified as king of Denmark, of the Danes, or of a constituent region in the work in question.
- 🗸 indicates that the person is identified in the work, but not expliticly as king of Denmark or of the Danes.
- ꕀ indicates that the person is not mentioned in the work, but that this is not necessarily inconsistent with their identification as king.
- 🞨 indicates that the person is not mentioned in the work, and that the kingship of an equivalent person is inconsistent with the given work (only for comprehensive chronicles).
- Numerals after the leading symbol indicate the order in which the kings reign or individuals appear in the work in question.

Gregory of Tours (L, 6 C.)	Widsith (OE, 6 C.–10 C.)	Beowulf (OE, 8 C.–11 C.)	Chronicon Lethrense (L, 12 C.)	Sven Aggesen (L, 12 C.)	Gesta Danorum (L, 12 C.)	Ynglinga saga (ON, c.1225)	Sögubrot (ON, c.1250)	Resen manuscript (ON, c.1254)	Runekrønike (ON, c.1319)	Hrólfs saga kraka (ON, c.1400)
ꕀ	ꕀ	ꕀ	♕1 Dan (son of Ypper, two brothers)	🞨	♕1 Dan I (son of Humble, one brother)	🞨	ꕀ	🞨	ꕀ	ꕀ
ꕀ	ꕀ	♕3 Scyld	🞨	♕1 Skiold	♕4 Skioldus	🗸 Skjöldr	ꕀ	🗸1 Sciauldr	ꕀ	ꕀ
ꕀ	ꕀ	🗸 Froda (killed or was killed by Healfdeane)	♕11 Frothi Largus ("the Generous", son of Fritleff)	♕6 Frothi the Bold (son of Rokil Slagenback) ♕10 Frothi the Old (son of Dan Elatus) ♕12 Frothi Frithgothæ ("the Magnificent", son of Frithlefer)	♕9 Frotho I (son of Hadingus) ♕23 Frotho II (followed Huglecus) ♕26 Frotho III (son of Fridlevus the Swift) ♕29 Frotho IV (son of Fridlevus II) ♕32 Frotho V (son of Olavus I) ♕61 Frotho VI (son of Kanutus I)	♕1 Friðfróði ♕3 Fróði hinn mikilláti or friðsami ("the Proud" or "Peace-loving", son of Dan) ♕6 Fróði hinn frækni ("the Bold")	ꕀ	🗸3 Friðfroði (son of Fridleif) 🗸6 Froði (son of Havarr handrame) 🗸10 Froði friðsami ("the Peace-loving", son of Danr mikilati) 🗸12 Froði enn fręcni ("the Bold", son of Friðleifr) 🗸18 Froði (son of Hręrecr hnoggvanbavgi)	♕1 Froþe ᚠᚱᚮᚦᛅ (son of Hading ᚼᛆᛑᛁᚿᚵ) ♕11 Froþe ᚠᚱᚮᚦᛅ (son of Huhlek ᚼᚢᚼᛚᛅᚴ) ♕14 Froþe Friþgoþe ᚠᚱᚮᚦᛅ:ᚠᚱᛁᚦᚵᚮᚦᛅ (son of Friþlef ᚠᚱᛁᚦᛚᛅᚠ) ♕16 Froþe ᚠᚱᚮᚦᛅ (son of Friþlef ᚠᚱᛁᚦᛚᛅᚠ) ♕18 Froþe ᚠᚱᚮᚦᛅ (son of Olaf ᚮᛚᛆᚠ) ♕34 Froþe ᚠᚱᚮᚦᛅ (followed Lota Knut ᛚᚮᛐᛆ:ᚴᚿᚢᛐ)	♕2 Fróði (brother of Hálfdan)
ꕀ	ꕀ	♕5 Healfdene (son of Beowulf)	♕3 Haldan (son of Ro)	♕2 Halfdan (son of Skiold)	♕11 Haldanus I (son of Frotho)	♕4 Hálfdan (son of Fróði friðsami)	ꕀ	🗸14 Halfdan (son of Froði fręcni)	♕2 Haldan ᚼᛆᛚᛑᛆᚿ (son of Froþe ᚠᚱᚮᚦᛅ)	♕1 Hálfdan (brother of Fróði)
ꕀ	♕ Hroðgar	♕7 Hroðgar (son of Healfdene)	♕2 Ro (son of Dan)	🞨	♕12 Roe (son of Haldanus)	ꕀ	ꕀ	🗸15 Hroarr (son of Halfdan)	♕3 Ro ᚱᚮ (son of Froþe ᚠᚱᚮᚦᛅ, brother of Haldan ᚼᛆᛚᛑᛆᚿ)	♕3 Hróarr (son of Hálfdan)
ꕀ	ꕀ	🗸 Halga (son of Healfdene)	♕3 Helgi (son of Ro)	♕3 Helghi (son of Halfdan)	♕13 Helgo (son of Haldanus)	♕9 Helgi (son of Hálfdan)	ꕀ	🗸15 Helgi (son of Halfdan)	♕3 Hælhæ ᚼᛅᛚᚼᛅ (son of Froþe ᚠᚱᚮᚦᛅ, brother of Haldan ᚼᛆᛚᛑᛆᚿ)	♕3 Helgi (son of Hálfdan)
ꕀ	♕ Hroþwulf (nephew of Hroðgar)	🗸 Hroðulf (nephew of Hroðgar)	♕7 Rolf Kraki (son of Helgi)	♕4 Rolf Kraki (son of Helghi)	♕14 Rolvo Krake (son of Helgo)	♕10 Hrólfr kraki (son of Helgi)	ꕀ	🗸16 Hrolfr kraci (son of Helgi)	♕4 Rolf Krakæ ᚱᚮᛚᚠ:ᚴᚱᛆᚴᛅ (son of Hælhæ ᚼᛅᛚᚼᛅ)	♕4 Hrólfr Kraki (son of Helgi)
ꕀ	ꕀ	🗸 Heoroweard (son of Heorogar)	♕8 Hiarwart (husband of Sculd)	🞨	♕15 Hiarwarthus (husband of Sculda)	ꕀ	ꕀ	🞨	🞨	♕5 Skuld (wife of Hjörvarðr)
ꕀ	ꕀ	🗸 Hreðric (son of Hroðgar)	🞨	♕5 Rokil Slagenback ("ringslinger", son of Rolf Kraki)	♕17 Rorik Slyngebond ("ringslinger", son of Hotherus)	ꕀ	♕2 Hrærekr (brother of Helgi and husband of Auðr) 🗸 Hrærekr slöngvandbaugi ("ringslinger", son of Harald Wartooth)	🗸17 Hręrecr hnoggvanbaugi ("ring-stingy", son of Ingialdr) 🗸20 Hręrecr Sløngvanbaugi ("ringslinger", son of Halfdan and husband of Auðr)	♕6 Roþrik ᚱᚮᚦᚱᛁᚴ (son of Høþær ᚼᚯᚦᛅᚱ)	🗸 Hrókr (nephew of Hróarr and Helgi)
ꕀ	ꕀ	🗸 Garmund (grandfather of Eomer)	🞨	♕7 Wermund (son of Frothi hin Frökni)	♕19 Wermundus (son of Wiglecus)	ꕀ	ꕀ	🗸7 Varmundr vitri ("the Wise", son of Froði)	♕8 Uærmund ᚢᛅᚱᛘᚢᚿᛑ (son of Uiþlek ᚢᛁᚦᛚᛅᚴ)	ꕀ
ꕀ	🗸 Offa (ruled the Angles)	🗸 Offa (ruled an empire, father of Eomer)	🞨	♕8 Uffi (son of Wermund)	♕20 Uffo, aka Olaf the Gentle (son of Wermundus)	ꕀ	ꕀ	🗸8 Olafr litillati ("the Humble", son of Varmundr)	♕9 Uffi Starke ᚢᚠᚠᛁ:ᛋᛐᛆᚱᚴᛅ ("the Strong", son of Uærmund ᚢᛅᚱᛘᚢᚿᛑ)	ꕀ
ꕀ	ꕀ	ꕀ	🞨	♕9 Dan Elatus or Superbus ("the Proud", son of Uffi)	♕21 Dan (son of Uffe) ♕24 Dan (son of Frotho Vegetus)	♕2 Dan mikilláti ("the Proud", son of Danp)	ꕀ	🗸9 Dan mikilati ("the Proud", son of Olaf litillati)	♕10 Dan ᛑᛆᚿ (son of Uffi ᚢᚠᚠᛁ) ♕12 Dan Dahfulli ᛑᛆᚿ:ᛑᛆᚼᚠᚢᛛᛚᛁ (son of Froþe ᚠᚱᚮᚦᛅ)	ꕀ
♕ Chlochilaicus	ꕀ	🗸 Hygelac (king of the Geats)	🞨	🞨	♕22 Huglecus (son of Dan II) 🗸 Huglecus (Irish king defeated by Starcatherus and Haco)	🗸 Hugleik (Swedish king defeated by Haki and Starkad)	ꕀ	🞨	♕10 Huhlek ᚼᚢᚼᛚᛅᚴ (brother of Dan ᛑᛆᚿ, son of Uffi ᚢᚠᚠᛁ)	ꕀ
ꕀ	🗸 Ingeld (a Heaðobard defeated by Hroþwulf and Hroðgar)	🗸 Ingeld (a Heaðobard, son of Froda)	♕12 Ingyald (son of Frothi Largus)	♕13 Ingiald (son of Frothi Frithgothæ)	♕30 Ingellus (son of Frotho IV)	ꕀ	ꕀ	🗸13 Ingialdr (son of Froði enn fręcni)	♕17 Inggiæld ᛁᚿᚵᚵᛁᛅᛚᛑ (son of Froþe ᚠᚱᚮᚦᛅ)	ꕀ
ꕀ	ꕀ	ꕀ	♕13 Olav (son of Ingyald)	♕13 Olaf (next to succeed after Ingiald)	♕31 Olavus I (son of Ingellus, or Ingellus's sister)	ꕀ	ꕀ	🞨	♕17 Olaf ᚮᛚᛆᚠ (son of Inggiæld ᛁᚿᚵᚵᛁᛅᛚᛑ)	ꕀ
ꕀ	ꕀ	ꕀ	🞨	🞨	🞨	♕11 Ívarr víðfaðmi	♕3 Ívarr víðfaðmi	🗸33 Ivarr viðfaðmi	🞨	ꕀ
ꕀ	ꕀ	ꕀ	♕15 Harald Hyldetan (Wartooth)	🞨	♕39 Haraldus Hyldetan (Wartooth)	ꕀ	♕4 Harald Wartooth	🗸21/35 Haralldr hillditǫnn (Wartooth)	♕24 Harald Hilditan (Wartooth) ᚼᛆᚱᛆᛚᛑ:ᚼᛁᛚᛑᛁᛐᛆᚿ	ꕀ

=== Later semi-legendary kings ===
Royal Frankish Annals (L, 8 C.–9 C. contemporary)	Vita Ansgarii (L, 9 C. contemporary)	Annales Fuldenses (L, 9 C. contemporary)	Runestones (ON, 10 C. contemporary)	Adam of Bremen (L, 10 C.)	Widukind of Corvey (L, 10 C.)	Chronicon Roskildense (L, 12 C.)	Sven Aggesen (L, 12 C.)	Resen manuscript (ON, c.1254)	Ragnarssona þáttr (ON, c.1302)	Runekrønike (ON, c.1319)	Óláfs saga Tryggvasonar en mesta (ON, 14 C.)
♕2 Godofrid	ꕀ	ꕀ	ꕀ	♕ Gotafrid	ꕀ	ꕀ	🞨	🞨	🞨	♕30 Gøtrik ᚵᚯᛐᚱᛁᚴ	♕ Godefrid
♕3 Hemming (nephew of Godofrid)	ꕀ	ꕀ	ꕀ	♕ Hemming (cousin of Gotafrid)	ꕀ	ꕀ	🞨	🞨	🞨	🞨	♕ Hemming (nephew of Godefrid)
♕4 Sigifrid and Anulo (rivals to succeed Hemming in 812)	ꕀ	ꕀ	ꕀ	♕ Sigefrid and Anulo (rivals to succeed Hemming)	ꕀ	ꕀ	🞨	🗸22/37 Sigurðr hringr	♕1 Hring	🞨	♕ Sigfrod and Ring Anulo (rivals for rule of Jutland) ♕ Sigurd Ring
ꕀ	ꕀ	ꕀ	ꕀ	🗸 Lodbrok (father of Ingvar)	ꕀ	🗸 Lothpardus (father of Ywar)	🗸 Regner Lothbrogh (father of Sighwarth)	🗸23 Ragnarr loðbroc (son of Sigurðr hringr, father of Sigurðr ormr i avga)	♕2 Ragnar, aka Loðbrók	♕31 Ræhinar Loþbroke ᚱᛅᚼᛁᚿᛆᚱ:ᛚᚮᚦᛒᚱᚮᚴᛅ	♕ Ragnar Lodbrok
♕5 Reginfrid (overthrown with his co-ruler brother Harald by the sons of Godofrid)	ꕀ	ꕀ	ꕀ	♕ Reginfrid (overthrown by his co-ruler brother Harald)	ꕀ	ꕀ	🞨	🞨	🞨	🞨	🗸 Reinfrid (a son of Gudfred defeated by Harald)
♕6 Hariold	♕1 Harald (ruled some of the Danes)	♕1 Hariold	ꕀ	♕ Harald	ꕀ	♕1 Haraldus	♕18 Klak-Harald	🞨	♕5 Klakk-Harald (King of Jutland)	🞨	♕ Harold (baptised); Clack-Harold (Earl of Jutland)
♕7 Hohric	♕2 Horic the elder	♕2 Horic	ꕀ	♕ Horic	ꕀ	♕2 Hericus	🞨	🞨	🞨	♕32 Erek ᛅᚱᛅᚴ	♕ Harek
ꕀ	♕3 Horic the younger	♕3 Horic	ꕀ	♕ Horic the younger	ꕀ	♕3 Hericus Puer (the child)	🞨	🞨	🞨	🞨	♕ Harek
ꕀ	ꕀ	ꕀ	ꕀ	♕ Heiligo	ꕀ	🞨	🞨	🞨	ꕀ	🞨	♕ Helgi
ꕀ	ꕀ	ꕀ	ꕀ	♕ Olaph (conquered Denmark from Heiligo)	ꕀ	🞨	♕14 Olaf (succeeded after Ingiald)	🞨	🗸 Olaf (possibly unrelated; grandson of an Ingjald)	🞨	♕ Olaf (conquered Denmark from Helgi)
ꕀ	ꕀ	ꕀ	🗸 Gnupa ᚴᚿᚢᛒᚢ	♕ Chnob (ruled with his brother Gurd, sons of Olaph)	♕ Knuba	🞨	🗸 Ennignup (landowner who was guardian of the kingdom when Knut was a child)	🞨	🞨	🞨	♕ Knut (ruled with Gyrd, after Olaf) ♕ Gnupa (a king in Reidgotaland, defeated by Gorm the Old)
ꕀ	ꕀ	ꕀ	♕ Sigtriku ᛋᛁᚴᛏᚱᛁᚴᚢ or Sigtriuk ᛋᛁᚴᛏᚱᛁᚢᚴ (Gnupa's son)	♕ Sigerich	ꕀ	🞨	ꕀ	🞨	🞨	🞨	♕ Siggeir (succeeded Gyrd and Knut)
ꕀ	ꕀ	♕4 Sigifred/Siegfried (had a brother named Halbden, ruled with Godafrid)	ꕀ	♕ Sigefrid (ruled with his brother Halfdan)	ꕀ	🞨	♕15 Sighwarth (son of Regner Lothbrogh)	🗸24 Sigurðr ormr i auga (son of Ragnarr loðbroc)	♕4 Sigurd Snake-in-the-Eye (son of Ragnar Lodbrok)	🞨	♕ Sigfrod (ruled with Halfdan) ♕ Sigurd Snake i'th'eye (ruler of Zealand and Skaney, son of Ragnar Lodbrok)
ꕀ	ꕀ	ꕀ	ꕀ	♕ Hardecnudth or Hardegon (son of Svein)	ꕀ	🗸 Hartha Knut (son of Sven, king of the Angles)	♕16 Knut (son of Sighwarth)	🗸25 Haurða knutr (son of Sigurðr ormr i auga)	♕5 Knut, aka Horda-Knut (son of Sigurd Snake-in-the-Eye)	♕33 Lota Knut ᛚᚮᛐᛆ:ᚴᚿᚢᛐ	♕ Horda-Knut (son of Sigurd Snake i'th'eye)
ꕀ	ꕀ	ꕀ	🗸 Gorm ᚴᚢᚱᛘ	♕ Wrm (son of Harthacnut)	ꕀ	♕5 Gorm (king after Frothi) ♕8 Gorm (son of Sven, brother of Hartha Knut, conquered Denmark from Haldanus)	♕19 Gorm Løghæ (son of Klak-Harald)	🗸26 Gormr gamli ("the Old", son of Haurða knutr)	♕6 Gorm (son of Horda-Knut)	♕35 Gorm Ænske ᚵᚮᚱᛘ:ᛅᚿᛋᚴᛅ ("the English", king after Froþe) ♕36 Gorm Gamble ᚵᚮᚱᛘ:ᚵᛆᛘᛒᛚᛅ ("the Old")	♕ Gorm the Old (son of Horda-Knut)}

- Valdar, sometimes assigned to the early 700s. Son-in-law of Ivar Vidfamne and sub-king in Denmark according to the late sagas.

== See also ==
- List of legendary kings of Sweden
- List of legendary kings of Norway
- List of legendary kings of Britain
