= Heorogar =

A mention of Heorogar in the Beowulf

Heorogar was a legendary Danish king who appears in the Old English poem Beowulf as the eldest son of Healfdene (Halfdan), and the brother of Hroðgar (Hroar), and Halga (Helgi). The people in parentheses are personages found also in Norse sources.

He is mentioned in lines 2155-2165 of the poem, when King Hrothgar gives Beowulf the armour and weapons that originally belonged to King Heorogar:

"Me ðis hildesceorp Hroðgar sealde,
snotra fengel, sume worde het
þæt ic his ærest ðe est gesægde;
cwæð þæt hyt hæfde *Hiorogar cyning,
leod Scyldunga lange hwile;

no ðy ær suna sinum syllan wolde,
hwatum Heorowearde, þeah he him hold wære,
breostgewædu. Bruc ealles well!"

Translation:

"Hrothgar, the wise prince, gave me this war-gear; he explicitly commanded me to tell you first of its lineage: he declared that King Heorogar, lord of the Scyldings, possessed it for a long time; yet he was not willing to give this chest-apparel to his own son, the brave Heoroweard, though he was loyal to him. Make good use of it all!"

Unlike Halga, Hroðgar, Healfdene, and Heorogar's son Heoroweard, Heorogar does not appear in Norse sources. However, Heorogar may explain why Heoroweard (according to Norse sources) rebelled against Hroðulf (Hrólf Kraki) and killed him. As the son of Heorogar, the eldest of Healfdene's sons, Heoroweard had greater right to the Danish throne than Hroðulf.

Family tree of the Scyldings (Kings of the Danes), Heathobards and Scylfings (Kings of the Swedes), according to Beowulf

♕ Heremod
♕ Scyld Scefing
♕ Beowulf
♕ Healfdene	♕ Ongentheow
♕ Heorogar	♕ Hrothgar	Wealhtheow	Halga	A daughter	♕ Onela	♕ Ohthere
Heoroweard	Hrethric	Hrothmund	Hrothulf	Froda	Eanmund	Eadgils
Freawaru	Ingeld

Legendary titles
Preceded by Healfdene	King of Denmark	Succeeded by Hroðgar
