= Hreðric and Hroðmund =

Characters in the Old English epic Beowulf

Hreðric and Hroðmund were the sons of the Danish king Hroðgar and his queen, Wealhþeow, in the Old English epic Beowulf. They are only mentioned in passing, and there seems to be some foreshadowing in Beowulf that their cousin, Halga's son Hroðulf, i.e. Hrólfr Kraki, would usurp the throne from them.

Family tree of the Scyldings (Kings of the Danes), Heathobards and Scylfings (Kings of the Swedes), according to Beowulf

♕ Heremod
♕ Scyld Scefing
♕ Beowulf
♕ Healfdene	♕ Ongentheow
♕ Heorogar	♕ Hrothgar	Wealhtheow	Halga	A daughter	♕ Onela	♕ Ohthere
Heoroweard	Hrethric	Hrothmund	Hrothulf	Froda	Eanmund	Eadgils
Freawaru	Ingeld

== Scandinavian tradition ==
It has been suggested that Hreðric corresponds to Hrœrekr Ringslinger (aka Hrörekr, Rørik, Hrókr or Roricus) in Scandinavian tradition. However, the traditions vary and so Hrörekr is either killed by Hrólfr Kraki or his successor as the ruler of Zealand (the Danish heartland).

In Saxo Grammaticus's Gesta Danorum (Book 2), Hrólfr Kraki kills a Rørik: "... our king, who laid low Rorik (i.e. Rørik), the son of Bok the covetous, and wrapped the coward in death." Rørik is the expected Old East Norse form of Hreðric, and personages named Rørik, Hrok or similar such names can be found in most versions of the Hrólf Kraki tradition.

In the Skjöldunga saga, Valdar disputes Hrörekr's succession of Hrólfr Kraki as the king of the Daner. After the war, Hrörekr took Zealand, while Valdar took Skåne. If based on the same tradition as Hversu Noregr byggdist, Valdar had the right to claim the throne being the son of the former king Hróarr (Hroðgar).

Even though Hrólfr Kraki was made their guardian, their mother could have easily fled back to her Wuffing kin, as the male line of Hroðgar seemed to live on through Valdar. Valdar also took power in Scane, which makes sense as it is near Östergötland. After Ingjald's death, Sögubrot relates, Ivar Vidfamne gave the East Geatish throne to Hjörmund, the son of Hjörvard, since it had been the kingdom of Hjörmund's father Hjörvard. As Ivar Vidfamne was a great grandson of Hroðgar and his Wuffing wife Wealhþēow, this could be seen as a reward for loyalty as well as kinship with the Wuffings.
