= Heremod =

Legendary 2nd century Danish king

Heremod (Proto-Norse: *Harimōdaz, Latin form: Heremodius) is a legendary Danish king and a legendary king of the Angles who would have lived in the 2nd century and known through a short account of his exile in the Old English poem Beowulf and from appearances in some genealogies as the father of Scyld. He may be the same as one of the personages named Hermóðr in Old Norse sources. Heremod may also be identical to Lother (Latin Lotherus) in Saxo Grammaticus' Gesta Danorum (Book 1) or the same history may have been applied to two originally separate figures.

== From Beowulf ==
In Beowulf, after Beowulf has defeated Grendel, a bard sings the deeds of Sigmund:

He had of all heroes the highest renown
among races of men, this refuge-of-warriors,
for deeds of daring that decked his name
since the hand and heart of Heremod
grew slack in battle. He, swiftly banished
to join with Jutes at mercy of foes,
to death was betrayed; for torrents of sorrow
had lamed him too long; a load of care
to earls and athelings all he proved.
Oft indeed, in earlier days,
for the warrior's wayfaring wise men mourned,
who had hoped of him help from harm and bale,
and had thought their sovran's son would thrive,
follow his father, his folk protect,
the hoard and the stronghold, heroes' land,
home of Scyldings (Denmark).

It appears that Heremod was banished by his subjects and fled to the Jutes where he was betrayed to his death. After Beowulf has slain Grendel's dam, King Hrothgar speaks again of Heremod:

Was not Heremod thus
to offspring of Ecgwela, Honor-Scyldings,
nor grew for their grace, but for grisly slaughter,
for doom of death to the Danishmen.

He slew, wrath-swollen, his shoulder-comrades,
companions at board! So he passed alone,
chieftain haughty, from human cheer.
Though him the Maker with might endowed,
delights of power, and uplifted high
above all men, yet blood-fierce his mind,
his breast-hoard, grew, no bracelets gave he
to Danes as was due; he endured all joyless
strain of struggle and stress of woe,
long feud with his folk.

Family tree of the Scyldings (Kings of the Danes), Heathobards and Scylfings (Kings of the Swedes), according to Beowulf

♕ Heremod
♕ Scyld Scefing
♕ Beowulf
♕ Healfdene	♕ Ongentheow
♕ Heorogar	♕ Hrothgar	Wealhtheow	Halga	A daughter	♕ Onela	♕ Ohthere
Heoroweard	Hrethric	Hrothmund	Hrothulf	Froda	Eanmund	Eadgils
Freawaru	Ingeld

== In genealogies ==
In genealogies Heremod appears as son of Itermon son of Hratha son of Hwala or Gwala. Heremod is also the father of Scyld in most of these genealogies. See Sceafa for a fuller treatment.

- Note: Sceafa is not Scyld, but is Seskef/Cespeth/Scef. Scelda/Skjöld/Scyld is a descendant of Sceafa, as noted all lineages referenced on the Sceafa wiki.

The Beowulf poet may have followed the same tradition, knowing a tale in which in the driving out of Heremod, Heremod's young son and heir Scyld somehow ended up placed in a ship which was set adrift.

== From Annales Ryenses and Gesta Danorum ==
In the Annales Ryenses and Saxo Grammaticus' Gesta Danorum (Book 1) Skjöld, that is Scyld, is preceded by a king named Lother, not one name Heremod. But what we are told of Lother fits closely with what the Beowulf poet says of Heremod. Saxo relates that King Dan left two sons behind, Humbli and Lother. Then:

Humbli was elected king at his father's death, thus winning a novel favour from his country; but by the malice of ensuing fate he fell from a king into a common man. For he was taken by Lother in war, and bought his life by yielding up his crown; such, in truth, were the only terms of escape offered him in his defeat. Forced, therefore, by the injustice of a brother to lay down his sovereignty, he furnished the lesson to mankind, that there is less safety, though more pomp, in the palace than in the cottage. Also, he bore his wrong so meekly that he seemed to rejoice at his loss of title as though it were a blessing; and I think he had a shrewd sense of the quality of a king's estate. But Lother played the king as insupportably as he had played the soldier, inaugurating his reign straightway with arrogance and crime; for he counted it uprightness to strip all the most eminent of life or goods, and to clear his country of its loyal citizens, thinking all his equals in birth his rivals for the crown. He was soon chastised for his wickedness; for he met his end in an insurrection of his country; which had once bestowed on him his kingdom, and now bereft him of his life.

Saxo then turns to Lother's son Skjöld.

That Lother seems in this account to have been killed immediately may be compression of a longer narrative. J. R. R. Tolkien in his Finn and Hengest (p. 58) provides a variant version found in the Scondia Illustrata by Johannes Messenius (Stockholm, 1700) which likely relies on lost sources rather than on Messenius' poor memory. Tolkien translates from Messenius' Latin:

... therefore Lotherus, King of the Danes, bereft of his wealth because of his excessive tyranny, and defeated, fled into Jutia.

== From Tolkien ==
Tolkien points out that Beowulf was unknown at the time and so could not have influenced Messenius to imagine Lotherus fleeing to Jutland. The story then becomes quite strange. The king placed on the Danish throne in place of Lotherus is Baldr. Lotherus returns from exile, kills Baldr and then is himself killed by Odin. It looks as though Lother has been confused with Höðr.

Lother might also be identical with the puzzling god Lóðurr. Commentators sometimes suggest Lóðurr is identical to Loki, and of course in the Icelandic texts that have come down to us it is Loki who is Baldr's real slayer, with Höðr/Hother being only a tool in Loki's plot.

Preceded by Itermon	Scyldings	Succeeded by Scyld
