= Eanmund =

Swedish prince attested in Beowulf

Eanmund was a Swedish prince of the Scylfing dynasty, whose existence is alleged in Beowulf. (Note: Beowulf, lines 2612-2615.)

== Life according to Beowulf ==
Unlike his relatives, Eanmund is only mentioned in Beowulf. Eanmund was the son of Ohthere, and was the brother of Eadgils. If he existed in real life, his real name was probably Proto-Norse *Aiwamunduz (Old East Norse Ēmund) or Āmunduz (Old East Norse Āmund). Ohthere died, and Ohthere's younger brother Onela, usurped the Swedish throne. Since their uncle had seized power, Eanmund and Eadgils sought refuge among the Geats. This caused Onela to attack the Geats, an attack which was also motivated by the fact that the Geatish thane Eofor had killed Onela's father Ongentheow. During the battle, Eanmund was killed by Onela's champion Weohstan and Heardred was killed as well. Eadgils, however, survived and according to the poem Beowulf later helped him avenge Eanmund and Ohthere by slaying Onela, an event which also appears in Scandinavian sources.

In the tale, Weohstan took Eanmund's sword which was inherited by his son Wiglaf who used the sword when fighting the dragon together with Beowulf.

Family tree of the Scyldings (Kings of the Danes), Heathobards and Scylfings (Kings of the Swedes), according to Beowulf

♕ Heremod
♕ Scyld Scefing
♕ Beowulf
♕ Healfdene	♕ Ongentheow
♕ Heorogar	♕ Hrothgar	Wealhtheow	Halga	A daughter	♕ Onela	♕ Ohthere
Heoroweard	Hrethric	Hrothmund	Hrothulf	Froda	Eanmund	Eadgils
Freawaru	Ingeld
