= King Olaf =

King Olaf, King Olav, or similar, may refer to:

== Kings of Denmark ==
- Any of several legendary kings of the Danes:
  - Olaf, son of Ingeld, according to Danish sources (e.g. Chronicon Lethrense, Sven Aggesen, Gesta Danorum)
  - Olafr litillati ("the Humble") or Olaf the Gentle, another name for Offa of Angel (Uffe), son of Wermund, according to Gesta Danorum and Langfeðgatal
  - Olaf, son of Gotric according to Gesta Danorum
- Olof the Brash (9th century), founder of the House of Olaf
- Olaf I of Denmark (c. 1050–1095), ruled 1086–1095
- Olaf (II) Haraldsen (died c. 1143), Danish anti-king who ruled Scania for a few years from 1139
- Olaf II of Denmark, (1370–1387), ruled 1376–1387, also King of Norway as Olaf IV

== Kings of Dublin ==
- Amlaíb Conung, (died c. 875), possibly synonymous with Olaf the White
- Amlaíb mac Gofraid (died 941), ruled 934–941, also King of Northumbria
- Amlaíb Cuarán, (c. 926–981), also King of Northumbria

== Kings of Mann and the Isles ==
- Olaf I Godredsson (c. 1080–1153)
- Olaf the Black (1173/4–1237), ruled 1229–1237

== Kings of Norway ==
- Olav I of Norway(960s–1000), Olav Trygvason, ruled 995–1000
- Olav II of Norway (995–1030), Olav Haraldson, ruled 1015–1028, canonised
- Olav III of Norway (c. 1050–1093), Olav Kyrre, ruled 1067–1093
- Olav Magnusson of Norway (1099–1115), ruled 1103–1115
- Olav IV of Norway (1370–1387), ruled 1380–1387, also King of Denmark as Olav II
- Olaf V of Norway (1903–1991), ruled 1957–1991

== Kings of Sweden ==
- Olof (I) of Sweden (fl. 854)
- Olof (II) Björnsson, ruled c. 970–975
- Olof Skötkonung (c. 980–1022), ruled 995–1022

== Other people ==
- Olaf the White (9th century), Viking sea-king, possibly synonymous with Amlaíb Conung
- Amlaíb Cenncairech, King of Limerick, ruled 932–937
- Amlaíb of Scotland, (died 977), King of Scots
- King Olaf of Camelot, fictional ruler in the television series Merlin; see List of Merlin characters

== Other uses ==
- The Saga of King Olaf, a poem by Henry Wadsworth Longfellow
- Scenes from the Saga of King Olaf, choral work by Edward Elgar based on the Longfellow poem

== See also ==
- Óláfs saga (disambiguation)
