= Eanumund =

Eanmund or Eanumund is an Anglo-Saxon name, and may refer to:

- Eanmund, a prince in the legend of Beawolf
- Eanumund (abbot of Bredon) (fl. 845), abbot of Bredon in the Kingdom of Mercia
- Eanumund (abbot of Crayke), abbot of Crayke
- Eanumund (abbot of Kent) (fl. 823)
- Eanumund (of Wiltshire), of Wiltshire, in the Kingdom of Wessex
- Eanumund I (fl. 825)
- Saint Eanmund (lived during the Dark Ages)
