= Sceafa =

Ancient Lombardic king in English legend

Sceaf in the boat, illustration from Fredrik Sander's 1893 edition of the Poetic Edda

Sceafa (Old English: Scēafa [ˈʃæːɑvɑ], also Scēaf, Scēf) was an ancient Lombardic king in English legend. According to his story, Sceafa appeared mysteriously as a child, coming out of the sea in an empty skiff. The name also appears in the corrupt forms Seskef, Stefius, Strephius, and Stresaeus. Though the name has historically been modernized Shava (and Latinized Scefius), J.R.R. Tolkien used the correctly constructed modern English spelling Sheave.

== Widsith ==
The Old English poem Widsith, line 32, in a listing of famous kings and their countries, has Sceafa Longbeardum, so naming Sceafa as ruler of the Lombards. In Origo Gentis Langobardorum the Lombards' origins are traced to an "island" in the north named Scadan or Scandan ("Scandinavia"). But neither this account or any other mentions Sceafa among their later kings or gives the names of any kings that ruled them in the land of their origin where they were said to have been known as the Winnili.

== In genealogies ==
Other than this, Sceaf is mentioned only in chronicles tracing the lineage of the English kings, although variants are found in similar genealogies for the rulers of the Danes, Norwegians and Icelanders in the sagas. Most such genealogies stop at the god Odin, but some trace the supposed ancestors of Odin up to a certain Geat. The account in the Historia Britonum calls Geat a son of a god. Asser in his Life of Alfred writes instead that the pagans worshipped Geat himself for a long time as a god.

Modern scholars speculate on whether this Geat is any eponym of the people known as Geats, or whether it may be the name of a god, or whether it is both. The apparent Old Norse cognate form Gautr is a very common byname for Odin. The Icelandic Herrauðssaga speaks of King Hring who ruled East Götaland and was son of Gauti son of Odin. Jordanes in his The origin and deeds of the Goths traces the line of the Amelungs up to Hulmul son of Gapt, purportedly the first Gothic hero of record. This Gapt is felt by many commentators to be an error for Gaut.

A few of these genealogies provide mortal ancestors to Geat, tracing his ancestry to Sceaf and then tell of Sceaf's origin. Æthelweard in his Chronica writes of Sceaf:

This Scef came in a light boat to an island of the ocean which is called Scani, arms around about him, and he was a very young boy, unknown to the dwellers in the land. But he was accepted by them and cared for like one of their own kind, and afterwards they chose him as king, from whose family descended King Æthelwulf.

William of Malmesbury in his Gesta Regum Anglorum wrote:

. . . Sceaf. Iste, ut ferunt, in quondam insulam Germaniae Scandzam (de qua Jordanes, historiographus Gothorum, loquitur) appulsus, navi sine remige, puerulus, posito ad caput frumenti manipulo, dormiens, ideoque Sceaf nuncupatus, ab hominibus regionis illius pro miraculo exceptus, et sedulo nutritus: adulta aetate regnavit in oppido quod tunc Slaswic, nunc vero Haithebi appellatur. Est autem regio illa Anglia Vetus dicta, unde Angli venerunt in Britanniam, inter Saxones et Gothos constituta.

. . . Sceaf; who, as some affirm, was driven on a certain island in Germany, called Scandza, (of which Jordanes, the historian of the Goths, speaks), a little boy in a skiff, without any attendant, asleep, with a handful of corn (barley) at his head, whence he was called Sceaf; and, on account of his singular appearance, being well received by the men of that country, and carefully educated, in his riper age he reigned in a town which was called Slaswic, but at present Haithebi; which country, called old Anglia, whence the Angles came into Britain, is situated between the Saxons and the Goths.

However the genealogy in the Anglo-Saxon Chronicle year 855, versions B and C, explains instead that Scef was born in Noah's Ark, interpreting Sceaf as Noah's fourth non-Biblical son, and then continuing with the ancestry of Noah up to Adam as found in Genesis.

Sceaf is unknown outside of English sources except for one mention in Snorri Sturluson's Prologue to the Prose Edda, which is informed by English sources.

== Scyld Scefing ==
=== In Beowulf ===
Older than these is the Old English poem Beowulf which applies the story of the boy in the boat instead to the Danish hero Scyld (Old Norse Skjǫldr), the ancestor of the legendary Danish royal lineage known as the Scyldings (Old Norse Skjǫldungar). In the opening lines of Beowulf, he is given the epithet Scefing, which might mean 'descendant of Scef', 'son of Scef', or 'of the sheaf'. The poem itself does not elaborate. But after relating in general terms the glories of Scyld's reign, the poet describes Scyld's funeral, how his body was laid in a ship surrounded by treasures, the poet explains:

They decked his body no less bountifully

with offerings than those first ones did
who cast him away when he was a child

and launched him alone out over the waves.

No other source relates anything similar about Scyld/Skjöld, so it cannot be known whether this is a case of similar stories being told about two different heroes or whether originally separate figures have been confused with one another.

=== A rite involving scyld and sceaf ===
A connection between sheaf and shield appears in the 13th century Chronicon de Abingdon which relates a dispute over ownership of a river meadow named Beri between the Abbot of Abingdon and the men of Oxfordshire. The dispute was decided by a ritual in which the monks placed a sheaf (sceaf) of wheat on a round shield (scyld) and a wax candle upon the sheaf which they lit. They then floated the shield with sheaf and candle on the Thames river to see where it would go. The shield purportedly kept to the middle of the Thames until it arrived at the disputed field, which was then an island because of flooding, whereupon it changed its course and entirely circled the meadow between the Thames and the Iffley.

== Variations on Sceaf's lineage ==
Sceaf and his lineage in different sources
Æ	ASC	Beowulf	Edda	WM
	Noe		Magi	Noe
Scef	Scef		Seskef	Strephius
	Bedwig		Bedvig	Bedwigius
	Hwala	(Ecgwela?)		Gwala
	Hratha		Athra (Annarr)	Hadra
	Itermon		Ítermann	Stermon
	Heremod	(Heremod)	Hermóðr	Heremodius
				Sceaf
Sceldius	Sceldwa	Scyld Sceafing	Skjaldun (Skjǫld)	Sceldius
Beowius	Beaw	Beowulf Scylding	Bjáf (Bjárr)	Beowius
Tætwa	Tætwa			Tetius
Geat	Geat		Ját	Getius

Æ = Æthelweard's Chronica.
ASC = Anglo-Saxon Chronicle, year 855 versions B and C. The A version omits the names Hwala, Bedwig, and Scef, almost certainly by accident, so that in that text it is Hrathra who is a son of Noah born in the ark.
Beowulf calls Heremod a Scylding and calls his people were Scyldings, which should mean Heremod was a descendant of Scyld. But that may be anachonistic usage of a common term.
Edda: The forms used indicate an English source. Of the three supposed Norse counterparts, the equation with Skjöld is obviously correct, but nothing is otherwise known about Bjárr or this particular Annarr. Seskef (that is Sceaf), in this pseudohistorical account, is son of Magi, son of Móda, son of Vingener, son of Vingethor, son of Einridi, son of Lóridi, son of Thor by Sif, Thor here being the son of Múnón, also called Mennón (equated with Memnon) by Tróan daughter of King Priam of Troy. Lóridi (more often Hlóridi) and Einridi are elsewhere names for Thor himself. The names Magi and Modi resemble the names Magni and Modi given to Thor's two sons in other sources. The other names are unique to this list. It is possible that a list of names applied to Thor or connected with Thor may have been at some stage misinterpreted as a lineage or that the names of the descendants of Thor in this list were earlier all applied to sons of Thor.
WM = William of Malmesbury's Gesta regum anglorum.

Scyld is sometimes son of Sceaf and sometimes son of Heremod and a descendant of Scef. William of Malmesbury combines both versions in making Scyld son of Sceaf and Sceaf son of Heremod, but then traces Heremod's ancestry up to Strephius, son of Noah, born in the ark, who is obviously Sceaf appearing a second time with corrupt name. Asser in his Life of Alfred repeats the listing of the Anglo-Saxon Chronicle for this section of his genealogy except that he replaces Sceaf altogether with the name Seth and mentions nothing about him being born in the ark. Some modern translations emend Seth to Shem who was son of Noah in the Genesis account.

It is possible that name of Beaw the son of Scyld may be a variant of beow 'barley' and that in part these figures derive from rustic folklore about King Sheaf and his son Barley into which the Shield element has intruded. Perhaps a misunderstanding of Scyld Scefing as Scyld the Scefing instead of Scyld of the Sheaf led to the boat story being transferred to Scyld's supposed father Sceaf when he became misunderstood as the true first king in the dynasty. There may be confusion between Danish traditions about Scyld/Skjöld and Anglic traditions about Sceaf. There is the possibility that Bedwig son of Sceaf is a corruption of Beaw son of Scyld. Scholars disagree.

For the descendants of Sceaf, only Scyld/Skjöld, Beaw, and Heremod are certainly known elsewhere outside these genealogies, though Hwala or Gwala is possibly the Ecgwela who appears in connection with Heremod in the poem Beowulf in the phrase "offspring of Ecgwela", apparently a kenning for Danes.

== King Sheave ==
J. R. R. Tolkien treated Sceaf in a poem "King Sheave" which was published after his death in "The Lost Road" in The Lost Road and Other Writings and very slightly revised and printed as prose in "The Notion Club Papers (Part Two)" in Sauron Defeated.

In Tolkien's treatment, a ship drifts to the land of the Longobards in the north. It beaches itself and the folk of that country enter and find a young and handsome boy with dark hair asleep with a "sheaf of corn" as his pillow and a harp beside him. The boy awoke the following day and sang a song in an unknown tongue which drove away all terror from the hearts of those who heard it. They made the boy their king, crowning him with a garland of golden wheat.

Tolkien's Sheave fathers seven sons from whence came the Danes, Goths, Swedes, Northmen, Franks, Frisians, Swordmen, Saxons, Swabians, English, and the Langobards.

Regnal titles
Preceded by New creation	Legendary king of the Angles	Succeeded by Bedwig
