= Chronicon Roskildense =

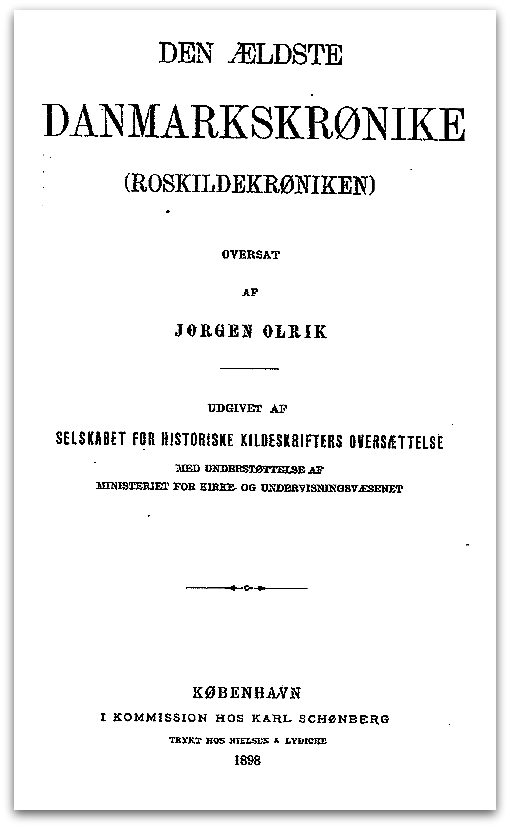
Chronicon Roskildense Danish translation from 1898

Chronicon Roskildense (Danish: Roskildekrøniken English: Roskilde Chronicle) is a small Danish historical work, written in Latin. It is one of the oldest known attempts to write a coherent account of Danish history by a Danish author, spanning from the introduction of Christianity in Denmark to the author's own time in the middle of the 12th century.

== History ==
The original chronicle covers the time frame of 826 to c. 1143. A later addition from the reign of King Valdemar I of Denmark, of a few more pages, takes the chronicle to 1157 when King Valdemar I gains the throne of Denmark; these additional pages are mostly direct quotes from other sources.

The author is unknown, but has been assumed to have had some connection to Roskilde Cathedral. The author is very confident with matters dealing with Roskilde. Churchly matters are not of special interest to the author who writes vividly about all kinds of local matters. Events themselves are only briefly covered while people taking part in them or even causing them are throughout covered with great passion.

Unlike Saxo's Gesta Danorum or Aggesen's Brevis Historia Regum Dacie, Chronicon Roskildense often covers the 'losing' side in these very same events as told by Saxo Grammaticus and Svend Aggesen. At times the author can seem very bitter and blinded by politic; however, this fact also makes this chronicle a very interesting piece of work. The early part of the work is in many cases based on Adam of Bremen's Gesta Hammaburgensis ecclesiae pontificum, sometimes even using direct quotes. However, the author only takes what is needed and the meaning is not always the same.

As with many Danish chronicles, the exact time of writing is not known with certainty. The original chronicle ends very suddenly. The last subject written about concerns the quarrel between Bishop Rike of Schleswig and Bishop Eskil of Lund over the Archbishop seat of Lund between 1137 and 1138. Olaf "II" Haraldsen, the son of Harald Kesja who is killed in 1143, is still alive as of the writing. With these in mind, the book must have been finished c. 1143.

The original manuscript is lost today and the chronicle exists now only in copies made in the 13th, 16th and 17th centuries. Copies in Latin reside in:

- University Library, Kiel, S. H. 8 A.8° (13th century). Known as Codex Kiloniensis.
- Den Arnamagnæanske Samling, Copenhagen, AM 107 8o (16th century).
- Uppsala University Library, De la Gardie XXV-XXIX (17th century).

The family tree of Kings of the Danes to Cnut the Great, according to Chronicon Roskildense

Kings of the Danes are marked with a crown (♕).

♕ Harald	♕ Heric
KEY
♕ Heric the Child	Explicit familial relationship
Doubtful familial relationship
♕ Frothi	Succession by other or unclear means
♕ Gorm
♕ Harald Blatan aka Clac Harald	Sven
♕ Haldan	♕ Gorm	Hartha Knut, King of the Angles	Haakon, King of the Norsemen
♕ Harold	Trucco
♕ Swen Forkbeard aka Swen Otto	♕ Olaf Cracaben, King of Norway
♕ Kanute	Olaf, King of Norway

The source used for the genealogical information and name spellings is the English translation provided by Mischa Hooker of Augustana College.

== Other sources ==
- Jørgen Olrik (1888). Den Ældeste Danmarkskrønike (Roskildekrøniken) (Copenhagen: Nielsen & Lydiche) (with Danish translation)
- "Chronicon Roskildense" in: Scriptores Minores Historiæ Danicæ, Vol. 1, ed. M.CL. Gertz, Copenhagen 1917–18
- Lotte Fang (1979). Roskildekrøniken - Den ældeste Danmarkshistorie (Viborg: Forlag Sesam A/S) ISBN 87-7324-517-8
- Mischa Hooker. Chronicon Roskildense English translation and commentary. Retrieved January 12, 2025.

== Related reading ==
- DuBois, Thomas Andrew (2008) Sanctity in the North: Saints, Lives, and Cults in Medieval Scandinavia (University of Toronto Press) ISBN 978-0802091307
