= Brevis historia regum Dacie =

12th-century Danish chronicle

Brevis historia regum Dacie or Compendiosa Regum Daniae Historia (English: "A Short History of the Kings of Denmark") is a historical chronicle written in Latin by Sven Aggesen, a Danish scholar from the 12th century, under the patronage of Archbishop Absalon. Sven was a contemporary of Saxo Grammaticus, author of the more famous Danish chronicle, the Gesta Danorum, and Sven's Brevis historia refers to Saxo by name.

== Contents ==
Brevis historia regum Dacie is a chronicle of kings of Denmark, starting with the lineage of legendary kings of Denmark beginning with King Skiold, which transitions into historical Danish kings around Gorm the Old, and finally ending with the ascension of then-contemporary Knut VI and his defeat of Bugislav, Duke of Pomerania, in 1185.

The family tree of legendary Kings of the Danes, according to Brevis historia regum Dacie by Sven Aggesen

Kings of the Danes are marked with a crown (♕).

♕ Skiold
KEY
Frothi	♕ Halfdan	Marriage or coupling
Parent and child
♕ Helghi	Inheritance by other or unclear means
♕ Rolf Kraki
♕ Rokil Slagenback
♕ Frothi the Bold
♕ Wermund
♕ Uffi
♕ Dan the High-minded, or the Proud
♕ Frothi the Old
♕ Frithlefer
♕ Frothi Frithgothæ, or the Magnificent
♕ Ingiald
♕ Olaf	Regner Lothbrogh
daughter	♕ Sighwarth
♕ Knut (first of that name in Denmark)
♕ Snio
♕ Klak-Harald
♕ Gorm Løghæ	Thyrwi, the Ornament of the Realm
historical kings of Denmark

The source used for the genealogical information and name spellings is the English translation by Eric Christiansen.

== History ==
=== Manuscripts ===
Sven's works (both the Brevis historia and the law code Lex Castrensis) survive via two manuscripts, though neither is considered to be an accurate replica of his original writings. These are:

- AM 33 4to, an "inexpert" copy probably commissioned by Claus Lyschander (1558–1624) of an early and authentic manuscript. It is currently held in the Arnamagnæan Manuscript Collection in the Arnamagnæan Institute in Copenhagen.
- The second manuscript, likely from the late 13th century, was lost in the Copenhagen Fire of 1728, but used as the basis for the first printed edition of Sven's works by Stephan J. Stephanius, at Sorø in 1642. Because the manuscript was lost, changes to the text can't be traced to their source (whether the 13th century scribe or Stephanius or any other).

Between 1915 and 1917, Martin Clarentius Gertz published the text from both sources, along with a reconstructed text that more closely reflected Aggesen's original work, in Scriptores minores historiæ Danicæ medii ævi. This series also included the Latin texts of other early minor chronicles of Danish history, including the Chronicon Lethrense and Chronicon Roskildense, the Compendium Saxonis, and others.

=== Translations ===
The primary English translation of this work, with some commentary, is by Eric Christiansen, for the Viking Society for Northern Research Text Series in 1992.

== Sources and external links ==
- CHRISTIANSEN, Eric, 'THE WORKS OF SVEN AGGESEN TWELFTH-CENTURY DANISH HISTORIAN', VIKING SOCIETY FOR NORTHERN RESEARCH TEXT SERIES, vol 9, 1992
- Latin text of Brevis historia regum Dacie, ed. M. C. Gertz, in Scriptores minores historiae Danicae, vol. 1 (1917)
