= Óláfs saga =

Óláfs saga or The Saga of King Olaf can refer to:

- The various versions of Óláfs saga Tryggvasonar
- The various versions of Óláfs saga helga
- Óláfs saga kyrra in Heimskringla
- The Saga of King Olaf, a poem by Henry Wadsworth Longfellow
