= Sven Aggesen =

Danish historian (born around 1140/1150)

- Born: around 1140 to 1150
- Occupation: Author
- Writing career
- Language: Danish
- Notable works: Brevis historia regum Dacie and other

Sven Aggesen (also known as Svend Aagesen, Aggessøn, or Aggesøn, in Latin Sveno Aggonis; born around 1140 to 1150, death unknown) was the author of Brevis historia regum Dacie, one of the first attempts to write a coherent history of Denmark covering the period 300-1185. Only the Chronicon Roskildense may precede Aggesen's efforts.

== Family ==
Sven Aggesen was born into a magnate family which had several well-known members.

The earliest known family member that we know of with some certainty is Sven's great-grandfather, Thrugot, who was married to Thorgunna, daughter of Vagn Aggesøn, a grandson of the legendary Palne Toke. Thrugot and Thorgunna had two sons, Sven and Vagn.

Sven Thrugotsøn (or Thorgunnasøn) had four sons. One, probably the eldest, Asser, was the first Archbishop of Lund (1104–1137) and also the first Archbishop of Scandinavia. Another, probably the youngest, Sven, was a canon in Lund, later in Viborg and even later (1132), bishop in Viborg. The third, Eskil, according to Eric Christiansen Eskil, and the last Christiern Svensøn, is Svend Aagesen’s grandfather.

Christiern Svensøn and his son Agge, who was Svend Aggesen’s father, fought during the civil war following Knud Lavard’s murder, on King Erik II Emune's side and Svend writes in Historia brevis regum Dacie, about their participating in these battles.

== Life and education ==
It is likely that Sven was educated at a monastery in Denmark, but given the knowledge of classical antiquity that he portrays through his writings, there is little doubt he received a more comprehensive education elsewhere, probably in one of the big Church-schools in France. Notable in the preface of Historia brevis regum Dacie, he mentions that reading the works of Latin historians was something that took up much of his time. On that note he writes, with sadness, that similar works did not exist for Danish kings, notable persons and events.

Like his forefathers, he joined King Valdemar I’s housecarls, known as Thinglid – who, it is said, had originated with King Canute the Great's corps. As a Thinglid, he was with King Valdemar I and later with King Canute VI during their numerous war expeditions, of which he mentions a few personal details in Historia brevis regum Dacie.

Because of his comment about Valdemar I’s Queen, Sophia, it seems that he might have been close to the King's court. Whether that was because of personal status or because of his forefathers' status, is unknown.

== Writing ==
His service with the King does not seem to have diminished his desire to write.

=== Witherlogh (Lex Castrensis) ===
The first work we know he wrote is a retelling of Witherlogh (known today in Danish as Lejrloven or Krigerloven or in English as Lejrlaw or Warriorlaw). It is also called Lex Castrensis, which is an old punishment and compensation law mostly applied to soldiers in the King's service.

This work was probably written in 1181–1182, and we read in the preface of this little work that Aggesen was already considering much bigger projects, because he mentioned his desire to write a list of the Kings of Denmark. It is thought that he did do this work, a necessary work in writing the history of Denmark, because a 13th-century writer used this list, called Genealogia Regum Daniae. Today the original list exists only as fragments.

=== Brevis Historia Regum Dacie ===
However his most famous work is Brevis Historia Regum Dacie, entitled Compendiosa regum Daniæ historia in one manuscript, thought to have been finished in 1186 or 1187 (the last event is described in 1185), a work covering Danish history beginning with the legendary King Skjold from around 300 to 1185.

== Relationship between Svend Aagesen and Saxo Grammaticus ==
Whether Svend knew Saxo Grammaticus by more than name, is an often discussed subject. Some comments in Brevis Historia Regum Daniae can be interpreted to support this view. Some researchers go as far as to say that they might have gone to school in France together, they both served various Kings of Denmark simultaneously, went on those Kings' many war expeditions and, as such, some of their writings are firsthand accounts. That is likely to be the case for Sven, but there is very little evidence to back this connection up for Saxo. There exists no direct evidence that they knew each other than by name.
