= Beowa =

Character from Anglo-Saxon religion

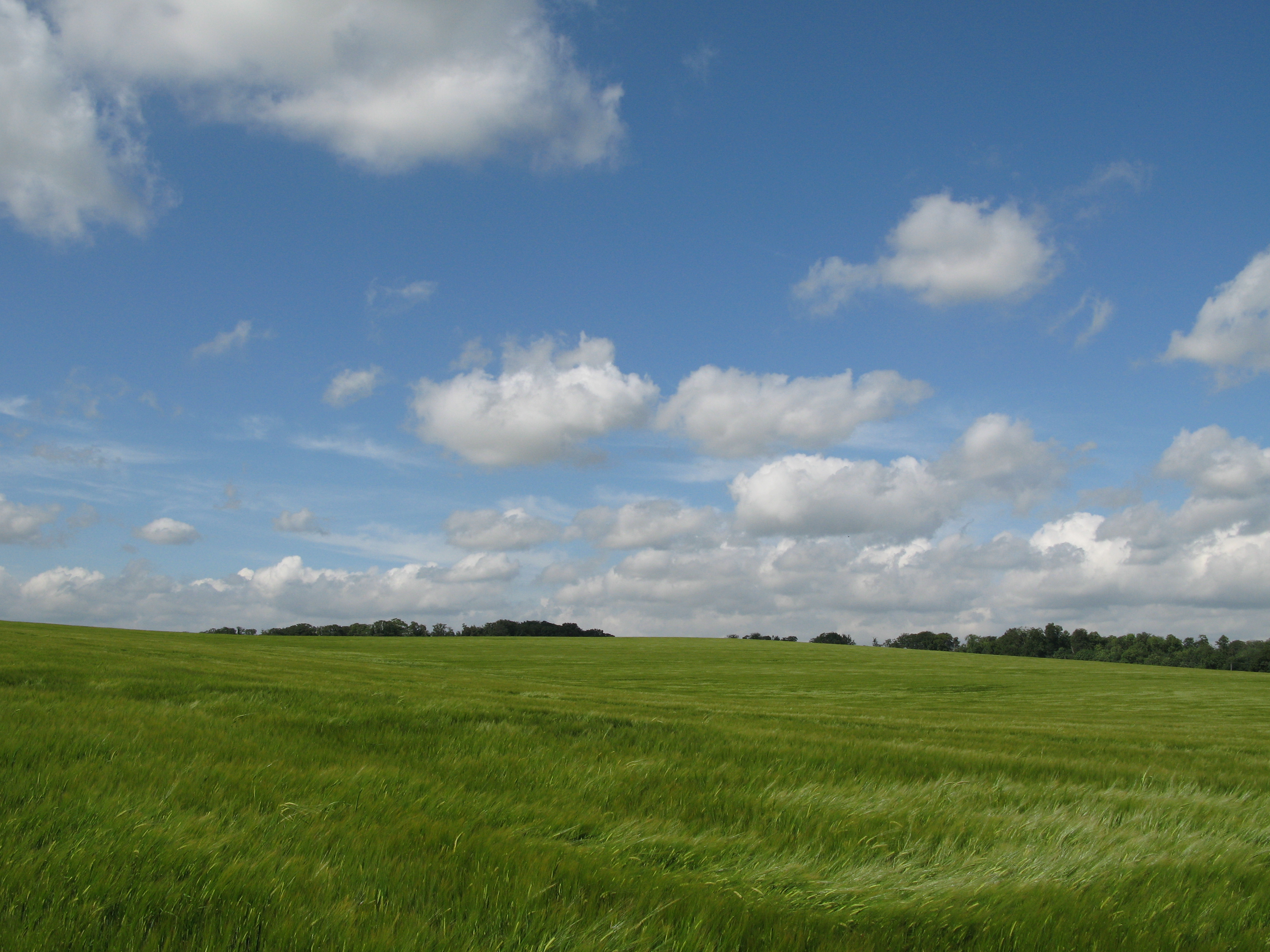
A field of barley in England

Beowa, Beaw, Bēow [beːow], Beo or Bedwig is a figure in Anglo-Saxon traditional religion associated with barley and agriculture. The figure is attested in the Anglo-Saxon royal genealogies as they were extended in the age of Alfred, where Beowa is inserted as the son of Scyld and the grandson of Sceafa, in lineages carried back to Adam. Connections have been proposed between the figure of Beowa and the hero Beowulf of the poem of the same name and English folk song figure John Barleycorn.

== Etymology ==
Beoƿ is an Old English word for barley. In the Anglo-Saxon genealogies, Beoƿa is the son or grandson of Sceafa, the Old English word for sheaf. The noun beoƿ has an Old Norse parallel in Bygg, the word for "grain." Related comparisons have been made between the figure of Beoƿ and Byggvir, attested in the Prose Edda as a servant of the god Freyr.

== Theories ==
Some scholars posit a connection between the mythical figure of Beowa and the legendary Beowulf. As the two characters possess many of the same attributes, it has been suggested that "a god Beowa, whose existence in myth is certain, became confused or blended with Beowulf."

Another possibility is that the (first) scribe responsible for the Beowulf text conflated two names. At the beginning of the poem, there is a character called Beowulf, the son of Scyld Scefing, but this character is not the Beowulf who is the protagonist of the poem. Rather than accepting that there are two different characters with this unusual name, many modern editions of the poem replace this name with "Beow". J. R. R. Tolkien, one of the proponents of reading "Beow" here, suggested that the use of "Beowulf" as Scyld Schefing's son was a scribal error for the original "Beow", noting that the two scribes who produced the Beowulf manuscript were "both extremely ignorant of and careless with proper names", and called the occurrence of "Beowulf" in this place in the manuscript "one of the oddest facts in Old English literature" and "one of the reddest and highest red herrings that were ever dragged across a literary trail".

Kathleen Herbert draws a link between Beowa and the figure of John Barleycorn of traditional English folksong. Herbert says that Beowa and Barleycorn are one and the same, noting that the folksong details the suffering, death, and resurrection of Barleycorn, yet also celebrates the "reviving effects of drinking his blood."

Beowa has also been connected to the figure of Bjárr or Bjórr, who appears in the Kálfsvísa (in which he rides a horse called Blakkr, or Black) and the Bjarkarímur (in which he is the grandfather of Bödvar Bjarki, who has been separately connected with the hero Beowulf).

== See also ==
- Byggvir
- Beyla
- Corn dolly
- Sif
