= Heaðobards =

Germanic people

A mention of Heaðobards in the Beowulf

The Heaðobards (Old English: Heaðubeardan, Old Saxon: Headubarden, "war-beards") were possibly a branch of the Langobards, and their name may be preserved in toponym Bardengau, in Lower Saxony, Germany.

They are mentioned in both Beowulf and in Widsith, where they are in conflict with the Danes. However, in the Norse tradition the Heaðobards, also called Hadubards, had apparently been forgotten and the conflict is instead rendered as a family feud, or as a conflict with the Saxons, where the Danes take the place of the Heaðobards. They are remembered in Norse sources in the names of Hothbrodus and Hǫðbroddr (in Gesta Danorum and Helgakviða Hundingsbana I respectively).

== Beowulf ==
In Beowulf, the Heaðobards are involved in a war with the Danes. When Beowulf reports on his adventure in Denmark to his king Hygelac, he mentions that Hroðgar had a daughter, Freawaru. Since Froda had been killed by the Danes, Hroðgar sent Freawaru to marry Ingeld, in an unsuccessful attempt to end the feud. An old warrior urged the Heaðobards to revenge, and Beowulf predicts to Hygelac that Ingeld will turn against his father-in-law Hroðgar. In a version given in the Danish chronicle Gesta Danorum, the old warrior appears as Starkad, and he succeeded in making Ingeld divorce his bride and in turning him against her family. Earlier in the Beowulf poem, the poet tells us that the hall Heorot was eventually destroyed by fire, see quote (Gummere's translation):

Sele hlīfade hēah and horn-gēap: heaðo-wylma bād, lāðan līges; ne wæs hit lenge þā gēn þæt se ecg-hete āðum-swerian æfter wæl-nīðe wæcnan scolde.	....there towered the hall, high, gabled wide, the hot surge waiting of furious flame. Nor far was that day when father and son-in-law stood in feud for warfare and hatred that woke again.

Most scholars, including Sophus Bugge, interpret the new war with Ingeld as leading to the burning of the hall of Heorot.

== Widsith ==
Whereas Beowulf never dwells on the outcome of the battle with Ingeld, the possibly older poem Widsith refers to Hroðgar and Hroðulf defeating the Heaðobards at Heorot:

Hroþwulf ond Hroðgar heoldon lengest sibbe ætsomne suhtorfædran, siþþan hy forwræcon wicinga cynn ond Ingeldes ord forbigdan, forheowan æt Heorote Heaðobeardna þrym.	Hroðulf and Hroðgar held the longest peace together, uncle and nephew, since they repulsed the Viking-kin hewn at Heorot Heaðobards' fame. and Ingeld to the spear-point made bow,
