= Freawaru =

Legendary Danish queen

Mention of Freawaru in the Beowulf

Freawaru, introduced in l. 2020 of the poem Beowulf, is the daughter of King Hroðgar and Queen Wealhþeow.

Freawaru is a freoðuwebbe or peace-weaver (an important concept in the poem) who is married to Ingeld, King of the Heaðobards and son of Froda. This marriage was created as a means of ending a feud between the two kingdoms (due to the murder of Froda by the Danes). It was an unsuccessful attempt to end the feud. An old warrior urged the Heaðobards to revenge, and Beowulf predicts to Hygelac that Ingeld will turn against his father-in-law Hroðgar. In a version given in the Danish chronicle Gesta Danorum (see below), the old warrior appears as Starkad, and he succeeded in making Ingeld divorce his bride and in turning him against her family.

== Scandinavian sources ==
In Gesta Danorum (book 6), Freawaru also appears, but unnamed. Froda and Ingeld are rendered as Danish kings, in conflict with the Saxons, and Freawaru is a Saxon princess.

The Danish king Frotho (Froda) was killed through treachery by a Saxon named Swerting (Swertingus). Frotho's son Ingeld (Ingellus) lived a wanton life and married one of Swerting's daughters. This angered Starkad so much that he enlisted at the Swedish king Halfdan's (Haldanus) court instead. As Ingeld continued his sinful life and did not do his duty to avenge his father, Starkad appeared during a banquet that Ingeld had with the sons of Swerting, his father's slayer. Starkad strongly admonished Ingeld and humiliated his queen who tried to calm Starkad with kindness and her costly ribbon. Starkad succeeded in exciting Ingeld to kill Swerting's sons and to divorce his Saxon bride.

== Sources and external links ==
- Book 6 of Gesta Danorum at the Online Medieval & Classical library
- The Social Centrality of Women in Beowulf: A New Context
