= Halfdan the Old =

Norwegian king in mythology

Halfdan the Old (Old Norse: Hálfdanr gamli and Hálfdanr inn gamli) was an ancient, legendary king from whom descended many of the most notable lineages of legend. A second Halfdan the Old is the purported great-grandfather of Ragnvald Eysteinsson.

== Halfdan the Old, ancestor of many lineages ==
=== Hyndluljód ===
The eddic poem Hyndluljód states in verses 14–16:

Of old the noblest of all was Áli,
Before him Halfdan, foremost of Skjöldungs [Skjǫldungar];
Famed were the battles the hero fought,
To the corners of heaven his deeds were carried.

Strengthened by Eymund [Eymundr], the strongest of men,
Sigtrygg [Sigtryggr] he slew with the ice-cold sword;
His bride was Álmveig [Álmveigr], the best of women,
And eighteen boys did Álmveig bear him.

Hence come the Skjöldungs, hence the Skilfings,
Hence the Ödlings [Ǫðlingar], hence the Ynglings,
Hence come the free-born, hence the high-born,
The noblest of men that in Midgard dwell:
And all are thy kinsmen, Óttar, thou fool!

Though Halfdan is himself called a Skjöldung in verse 14, in verse 16 the Skjöldungs are named instead as one of the families that sprang from Halfdan's marriage with Álmveig.

=== Skáldskaparmál ===
Snorri Sturluson explains in the Skáldskaparmál:

There was a king named Halfdan the Old, who was most famous of all kings. He made a great sacrificial feast at mid-winter, and sacrificed to this end, that he might live three hundred years in his kingdom; but he received these answers: he should not live more than the full life of a man, but for three hundred years there should be in his line no woman and no man who was not of great repute. He was a great warrior, and went on forays far and wide in the Eastern Regions: there he slew in single combat the king who was called Sigtrygg. Then he took in marriage that woman named Alvig the Wise, daughter of King Eymund of Hólmgard [Hólmgarðr]: they had eighteen sons, nine born at one birth. These were their names:

the first, Thengil [Thengill], who was called Thengil of Men;
the second, Ræsir;
the third, Gram [Gramr];
the fourth, Gylfi;
the fifth, Hilmir;
the sixth, Jöfur [Jǫfurr];
the seventh, Tyggi;
the eighth, Skyli or Skúli;
the ninth, Harri or Herra.

These nine brothers became so famous in foraying that, in all records since, their names are used as titles of rank, even as the name of King or that of Jarl. They had no children, and all fell in battle.

Snorri then gives examples from skaldic verse where these names are used as general terms for 'lord' or 'ruler'. The promise of three hundred years of no women among Halfdan's descendants is paralleled in the story of Ríg-Jarl who has sons only but no daughters. See Ríg (Norse god). None of the titles given here duplicate titles such as hersir, jarl, konungr, and dróttinn which appear in the Ríg account. Snorri continues:

Halfdan and his wife had nine other sons also; these were:

Hildir, from whom the Hildings are come;

Nefir, from whom the Niflungs sprang;

Audi [Auði], from whom the Ödlings [Ǫðlingar] are come;

Yngvi, from whom the Ynglings are descended;

Dag [Dagr], from whom come the Döglings [Dǫglingar];

Bragi, from whom the Bragnings are sprung (that is the race of Halfdan the Generous (Hálfdanr inn mildi);

Budli [Buðli], from whom the Budlungs [Buðlungar] are come (from the house of the Budlungs Atli and Brynhild [Brynhildr] descended);

the eighth was Lofdi [Lofði], who was a great war-king (that host who were called Lofdar [Lofðar] followed him; his kindred are called Lofdungs [Lofðungar], whence sprang Eylimi, Sigurd Fáfnir's-bane's mother's sire);

the ninth, Sigar [Sigarr], whence come the Siklings: that is the house of Siggeir [Siggeirr], who was son-in-law of Völsung [Vǫlsungr],—and the house of Sigar, who hanged Hagbard [Hagbarðr].

From the race of Hildings sprang Harald Red-beard [Haraldr granrauði], mother's father of Halfdan the Black [Hálfdanr inn svarti].

Of the Niflung's house was Gjúki.
Of the house of Ödlings, Kjár [Kjárr].
Of the house of the Ylfings was Eirík the Eloquent [Eiríkr inn málspaki].

The Skjöldungs and Skilfings mentioned in the Hyndluljód are missing here. The Ylfings are suddenly introduced at the end in a reference to Eirík the Eloquent yet are also not found among the nine families.

Snorri then immediately mentions what seem to be intended as four famous houses not descended from Halfdan the Old:

These also are illustrious royal houses:

from Yngvi, the Ynglings are descended;
from Skjöld in Denmark, the Skjöldungs are come;
from Völsung in the land of Franks, those who are called Völsungs.

One war-king was named Skelfir; and his house is called the House of Skilfings: his kindred is in the Eastern Region.

But Yngvi has been previously named as a son of Halfdan the Old and the Skjöldungs and Skilfings are counted among Halfdan's descendants in the Hyndluljód.

Snorri continues:

These houses which were named but now have been used in skaldship for titles of rank.

Snorri then quotes many skaldic verses which demonstrate this.

=== Ættartolur ===
==== Halfdan and his sons ====
The Ættartolur, the genealogies appended to the Hversu Noregr byggdist in the Flatey Book introduce Halfdan the Old as the ruler of Ringiríki (a territory including modern Ringerike and Valdres in Oppland). Halfdan is here the son of King Hring (eponym of Ringeríki) by the daughter of a sea-king named Vífil (Vífill). Hring was son of Raum the Old (eponym of Raumaríki) by Hild (Hildr) the daughter Gudröd the Old (Guðrǫðr inn gamli). Raum the Old was son of Nór (Nórr) (the eponym of Norway). See Nór for further details about Nór and his ancestry and descendants.

In his sacrifice Halfdan requested a lifetime of 300 years like that of his ancestor Snær. The form Tiggi appears instead of Tyggi in the list of the first nine sons. The list of the second nine sons has Skelfir instead of Yngvi and the form Næfil (Næfill) instead of Nefir. The order of the names is the same and it is explained that Hildir, Sigar, and Lofdi were war-kings; Audi, Budli, and Næfil were sea-kings, while Dag, Skelfir, and Bragi remained on their lands.

==== Döglings ====
Dag married Thóra Heroes-mother (Thóra drengjamóður) who bore him nine sons, but only four are named: Óli, Ám (Ámr), Jöfur, and Arngrím (Arngrímr).

Óli was father of Dag, father of Óleif (Óleifr), father of Hring, father of Helgi, father of Sigurd Hart (Sigurðr Hjǫrtr), father of Ragnhild (Ragnhildr) the mother of Harald Fairhair.

Arngrím married Eyfura who bore him Angantýr the Berserk (Angantýr berserkr). Angantýr's story is most fully treated in the Hervarar saga. It also appears in part in book five of Saxo Grammaticus' Gesta Danorum and an account only the deaths of Angantýr and his eleven brothers appears in Arrow-Odd's saga.

Stanza 18 of the Hyndluljód reads:

The mate of Dag was a mother of heroes [drengja móður],
Thóra, who bore him the bravest of fighters,
Fradmar [Fraðmarr] and Gyrd [Gyrðr] and the Frekis [Frekar] twain,
Ám and Jöfurmar [Jǫfurmar], Álf the Old;
It is much to know,— wilt thou hear yet more?

The name Ám agrees with that of a son of Dag in the Ættartolur and Jöfurmar is probably identical with Jöfur of the Ættartolur. Fradmar, Gyrd, Álf the Old, and the two Frekis bring the total to seven. Adding the names Óli and Arngrím to this list from the Ættartolur brings the tally to nine, as the Ættartolur promised. This may be coincidental. It is odd that the Hyndluljód here leaves out the only two names for which the Hversu provides descendants. It is possible that the following stanzas of the Hyndluljód down to stanza 24 cover otherwise unknown members of the Dögling lineage since stanza 23 at least returns to the Dödlings, providing the names of the twelve sons of Arngrím and the following stanza tells of their birth to Arngrím and Eyfura. Áli mentioned in stanza 14 of the Hyndluljód (quoted near the beginning of this article) may be identical to Óli son of Dag mentioned in the Ættartolur.

==== Bragnings ====
Bragi the Old [Bragi gamli] was king of Valdres and father of Agnar, father of Álf, father of Eirík (Eiríkr), father of Hild (Hildr) the mother of Halfdan the Generous, the father of Gudröd (Guðrǫðr) the Hunter, father of Halfdan the Black, father of Harald Fairhair.

==== Skilfings or Skjöldungs ====
Skilfir was king of Vörs (Vǫrs, modern Voss in northern Hordaland in southwestern Norway. Skelfir was father of Skjöld (Skjǫldr), father of Eirík, father of Alrek (Alrekr), father of Eirík the Eloquent, father of Alrek the Bold (Alrekr inn frækni), father of Víkar (Víkarr), father of Vatnar (Vatnarr), father of two sons: Ímald (Ímaldr) and Eirík, this Eirik being father of Gyda (Gyða) who was one of the wives of Harald Fairhair. They were called the Skilfing lineage or Skjöldung lineage. For commentary on this lineage and variant traditions on those listed here as belonging to it see Scylfing and Víkar.

==== Hildings ====
Hildir was father of Hildibrand (Hildibrandr), father of Vígbrand (Vígbrandr), father of Hildir and Herbrand (Herbrandr). Herbrand was father of Harald Red-beard, father of Ása who was the mother of Halfdan the Black, the father of Harald Fairhair.

(The text actually reads "Harald Grenski" (Haraldr inn grenski) instead of Harald Red-beard, but that must be an error. Harald Grenski was the name of a later figure, the father of King Olaf II of Norway, and the Ynglinga saga and many other sources name Harald Red-beard as Ása's father.

==== Siklings ====
Sigar is provided with two sons Siggeir and Sigmund (Sigmundr). Siggeir is prominent in Volsunga saga as the villainous husband of Signý the daughter of Völsung. Sigmund son of Sigar married Hild, daughter of King Grjótgard (Grjótgarðr) of Mœr. (See Gard Agdi for Grjótgard's genealogy.) Their son was Sigar, father of Signý, that Sigar who caused Hagbard (Hagbarðr) to be hanged.

One of the sources where the story of Hagbard appears is in Gesta Danorum, Book 7, which relates the love between Hagbarthus son of Hamundus and Signe daughter of King Sigarus despite Hagbarthus having slain her brothers. When Sigarus discovered the affair, he had Hagbarthus hanged. Then Hagbarthus' brother Haco/Hako/Haki avenged Hagbarthus. In this version Sigar/Sigarus is a king of Denmark, son of Sivaldus, son of King Ungvinus who was originally king of Götaland (see Hagbard and Signy for more).

There are places all over Scandinavia, associated with this legend such as Asige in the former Danish (presently Swedish) province of Halland, which borders Götaland, where there are two large menhirs called Hagbard's gallows.

Hagbard and his brother Haki are mentioned as great sea-kings in the Ynglinga saga where Haki wrests the Swedish throne from king Hugleik (this event also appears in Gesta Danorum where Haco kills the Irish king Huglethus) only to be killed later in battle with Hugleik's cousin Jorund.

A third reference to Hagbard and his brother Haki appears in the Völsunga saga, chapter 25. It is there said that Hagbard and Haki not yet avenged themselves for Sigar's abduction of one sister and the slaying of another. Either the reference is garbled or it refers to a lost variant with a more extended account of Sigar's feud with Hagbard and his brothers.

See Hagbard and Haki for more.

==== Lofdungs ====
Lofdi was a great king who raided Reidgotaland (Reiðgotaland) and became king there. Lofdi's sons were Skekkil Sea-king (Skekkill sækonungr) and Skyli. Skyli was father of Egdir (Egðir), the father of Hjálmthér (Hjálmþér), the father of Eylimi, the father of Hjördís (Hjǫrdís), the mother of Sigurd Fáfnir's-bane, father of Áslaug (Áslaugr) by Brynhild whose ancestry appears below in the Budling discussion. This Áslaug was a wife of Ragnar Lodbrok and by him the mother of Sigurd Snake-in-the-Eye (Sigurðr ormr í auga) who was father of a second Áslaug who was mother of Sigurd Hart. Sigurd Hart was father of Ragnhild (Ragnhildr), mother of Harald Fairhair as already stated.

But stanza 26 of the Hyndluljód identifies Eylimi the father of Hjördís as an Ödling.

==== Ödlings ====
Audi and his brother Budli were sea-kings who raided together and settled in Valland (Gaul) and Saxland (Saxony). Audi ruled in Valland. He was father of Fródi (Fróði), father of Kjár (Kjárr), father of Ölrún (Ǫlrún).

Ölrún, daughter of King Kjár of Valland, appears in the prose introduction to the Völundarkvida, as a Valkyrie swan-maiden who became the wife of Völund's brother Egil. The name Kjárr can be etymologically derived from Latin Caesar. But here the connection with France suggests it might be an adaptation of French Charles.

==== Budlungs ====
Budli the sea-king settled down in Saxland. He was father of Attil (Attill), father of Vífil (Vífill), father of Læfi, father of Budli. This second Budli was father of Sörli (Sǫrli) or Serli, of Atli, and of Brynhild. Brynhild was mother of Áslaug, ancestress of Harald Fairhair as described in the previous Lofdungs discussion.

Atli is a legendary version of Attila the Hun and the name Budli comes from Bleda who was the historical Attila's elder brother. The name Sörli is given to a brother of Atli only in this text. But in the eddic poem Atlamál hin grœnlenzku (stanza 50), Atli declares that he was one of four living brothers when his father Budli died and that half of them are now dead, slain by his wife Gudrún. In the German Nibelungenlied Attila is called Etzel and said to be son of Botelung, obviously Budlung interpreted as a name. In this account Etzel has a younger brother named Bloedelin who was slain by Dancwart, Hagen's brother. Blowdelin is probably another memory of the historical Bleda. The eddic poem Oddrúnargrátr tells of Atli's sister Oddrún and her forbidden love affair with Gunnar, which was, according to this poem, one of the motivations for Atli's later treachery. Oddrún is also mentioned in Sigurðarkviða hin skamma (stanza 57), in the prose introduction to Dráp Niflunga, and in the Völsunga saga.

==== Niflungs ====
King Næfil was father of Heimar, father of Eynef (Eynefr), father of Rakni, father of Gjúki. Gjúki was father of two sons named Gunnar (Gunnarr) and Högni (Hǫgni) and of two daughters named Gudrún (Guðrún) and Gudný (Guðný). For commentary and variant traditions see Nibelung.

== Halfdan the Old of Gór's lineage ==
The Orkneying saga does not speak at all of Nór's descendants, but introduces instead a figure named Halfdan the Old as the son of Sveidi (Sveiði) the Sea-king, who is called Svadi (Svaði) in the Ættartolur. Sveidi/Svadi in both texts was son of Heiti, son of Gór who was Nór's brother.

This second Halfdan the Old is father of Jarl Ívar of the Uplands who became father of Eystein the Clatterer (Eysteinn Glumra), in turn father of Jarl Rögnvald of Møre. The Orkneyinga saga derives both the Jarls of Orkney and the Dukes of Normandy from Rögnvald.

== See also ==
- Halfdan
