= Sigar =

People in Scandinavian mythology

The name Sigar can refer to four people in Scandinavian mythology, surrounding the legends of Sigurd the dragon slayer. One of them only appears as the friend of Helgi Hjörvarðsson in the eddic lay Helgakviða Hjörvarðssonar. The other two appear as the villainous members of the same clan in several sources.

== Icelandic sources ==
Snorri Sturluson writes in the Skáldskaparmál that two Sigars belong to the same clan, the Siklings, and that they are the relatives of Siggeir, the villainous Geatish king in the Völsunga saga.

[...] the ninth, Sigarr, whence come the Siklings: that is the house of Siggeirr, who was son-in-law of Völsungr,--and the house of Sigarr, who hanged Hagbardr.

In Hversu Noregr byggðist, it is given in more detail that Sigar the elder had two sons, Sigmund and Siggeir who killed Völsung. Sigmund had the son Sigar the younger, who killed Hagbard.

It is told in the Völsunga saga that Sigar the younger was in a feud with Hagbard and Haki and his sons. He had kidnapped one of Haki's daughters and murdered a second:

"Good talk," says Gudrun, "let us do even so; what kings deemest thou to have been the first of all men?" Brynhild says, "The sons of Haki, and Hagbard withal; they brought to pass many a deed of fame in the warfare." Gudrun answers, "Great men certes, and of noble fame! Yet Sigar took their one sister, and burned the other, house and all; and they may be called slow to revenge the deed; why didst thou not name my brethren who are held to be the first of men as at this time?"

Sigar the younger is also mentioned in Háleygjatal (as quoted in Ynglinga saga), where a gallows is referred to as "Sigar's steed" (Sigars jó):

En Guðlaugr grimman tamdi við ofrkapp austrkonunga Sigars jó, er synir Yngva menglötuð við meið reiddu. Og náreiðr á nesi drúpir vingameiðr, þar er víkur deilir, þar er fjölkunnt um fylkis hreyr steini merkt, Straumeyjarnes.	By the fierce East-kings' cruel pride, Gudlog must on the wild horse ride -- The wildest horse you e'er did see: 'Tis Sigur's steed -- the gallows tree. At Stromones the tree did grow, Where Gudlog's corpse waves on the bough. A high stone stands on Stromo's heath, To tell the gallant hero's death.

== Gesta Danorum ==
In Gesta Danorum (book 7), a figure named Sigar (Latin: Sygarus) is a legendary king of Denmark, the son of Siwald (Latin: Sywaldus), son of Yngwin.

Sigar had three sons. One of his sons was Alf, who went aviking. On a raiding tour to Finland, he met Alfhild, the daughter of king Siward, in Götaland. Alfhild had her own fleet of Viking ships, some of them staffed with maidens. Alf and Alfhild later married, and they had a daughter, named Gurid.

Sigar also had a daughter named Signy. Sigar was in a feud with Haki's brother Hagbard, but was informed by Signy's handmaid, that Hagbard had a secret love affair with Signy. Sigar decided to hang Hagbard, who, however, managed to inform Signy of this. Signy set her house on fire and succumbed in the flames while Hagbard executed himself in the gallows. Sigar tried in vain to save both Hagbard and Signy but failed. His only consolation was to bury the treacherous maid alive.

In a war fought against a revolting Danish Viking clan, Sigar, Alf and Alf's brothers were killed, while defending their Danish subjects. At the end of the war, Alf's comrade, Borgar, arrived with fresh cavalry from Scania, and slew all the enemies. But without a king, the country fell apart, and chieftains took control of the different parts.

Only Alf's daughter, Gurid, had survived, of the royal family. She later married one of Borgar's sons, Halfdan, and they had a son, named Harald, who became the new king. Harald restored the Danish kingdom to its former glory and unity.

The family tree of legendary Kings of the Danes, according to the Gesta Danorum (Books 1 to 7)

Kings of the Danes are marked with a crown (♕). Kings of the Swedes are marked with a dagger (†). Superscript numbers after a name indicate in which books of Gesta Danorum the individual is mentioned.

Humblus ♂ ^{(1)}
KEY
Angul ♂ ^{(1)}	♕ Dan I ♂ ^{(1)}	Grytha ♀ ^{(1)}	Marriage or coupling
Parent and child
The Angles	♕ Humblus ♂ ^{(1)}	♕ Lotherus ♂ ^{(1)}	King of the Saxons ♂ ^{(1)}	Succession by other or unclear means
Roarus ♂ ^{(1)}
Sigtrugus, King of the Swedes† ♂ ^{(1)}	♕ Skioldus ♂ ^{(1)}	Alvilda ♀ ^{(1)}
daughter of Roarus ♀ ^{(1)}	Bessus ♂ ^{(1)}
sister of Gram ♀ ^{(1)}	Gro ♀ ^{(1)}	♕ Gram† ♂ ^{(1)}	Sumblus, King of the Finns ♂ ^{(1)}
Wagnofthus ♂ ^{(1)}
Signe ♀ ^{(1)}	Henricus, King of the Saxons ♂ ^{(1)}	Haquinus, King of the Nitherians ♂ ^{(1)}
Harthgrepa ♀ ^{(1)}
♕Suibdagerus, King of Norway† ♂ ^{(1)}	sister of Guthormus ♀ ^{(1)}	♕Guthormus ♂ ^{(1)}	♕ Hadingus ♂ ^{(1,2,4,5)}	Regnilda ♀ ^{(1)}
Asmundus† ♂ ^{(1)}	Gunnilda ♀ ^{(1)}	Guthormus ♂ ^{(1)}
Ulvilda ♀ ^{(1,2)}	♕ Ubbo ♂ ^{(2)}
Henricus ♂ ^{(1)}	Uffo† ♂ ^{(1)}	Hundingus† ♂ ^{(1,2)}	Thorilda ♀ ^{(2)}	Scottus ♂ ^{(2)}
daughter of Uffo ♀ ^{(1)}	Regnerus† ♂ ^{(2)}	Suanhuita ♀ ^{(2)}	sisters of Suanhuita ♀♀ ^{(2)}	Andwan, King of the Hellespont ♂ ^{(2)}
Thoraldus ♂ ^{(2)}
♕ Frotho I ♂ ^{(2,5)}	daughter of Andwan ♀ ^{(2)}
Hothbrodus† ♂ ^{(2,3)}	♕ Haldanus I ♂ ^{(2)}	Roe ♂ ^{(2)}	Skato ♂ ^{(2)}
Thora ♀ ^{(2)}
♕ Helgo ♂ ^{(2,3)}	♕ Roe ♂ ^{(2)}
Athislus† ♂ ^{(2,3)}	Ursa ♀ ^{(2)}
King Gevarus ♂ ^{(2,3)}	♕ Rolvo Krake† ♂ ^{(2,3)}	Ruta ♀ ^{(2)}	Biarco ♂ ^{(2)}	Sculda ♀ ^{(2)}	♕ Hiarwarthus† ♂ ^{(2,3)}
♕ Hotherus† ♂ ^{(2,3)}	Nanna ♀ ^{(3)}	Herlecus ♂ ^{(3)}	Gericus ♂ ^{(3)}
former King of Britain ♂ ^{(3)}	mother of the King of Britain ♀ ^{(3)}	a slave ♂ ^{(3)}	a bondmaid ♀ ^{(3)}	♕ Roricus Slyngebond ♂ ^{(3)}	Gerwendillus ♂ ^{(3)}
King of Britain ♂ ^{(3,4)}	Queen of Britain ♀ ^{(3,4)}	Gerutha ♀ ^{(3,4)}	Horwendillus ♂ ^{(3,4)}	Fengo ♂ ^{(3,4)}
foster sister of Amlethus ♀ ^{(3,4)}	daughter of the King of Britain ♀ ^{(3,4)}	Amlethus ♂ ^{(3,4)}	Herminthruda, Queen of Scotland ♀ ^{(4)}	♕ Wiglecus ♂ ^{(4)}
son of Amlethus ♂ ^{(4)}	♕Wermundus ♂ ^{(4)}	Frowinus, governor of Sleswik ♂ ^{(4)}
♕ Uffo, aka Olavus the Gentle ♂ ^{(4)}	daughter of Frowin ♀ ^{(4)}	Keto ♂ ^{(4)}	Wigo ♂ ^{(4)}
♕ Dan II ♂ ^{(4)}
♕ Huglecus ♂ ^{(4)}
♕ Frotho II, the Vigorous ♂ ^{(4)}
♕ Dan III ♂ ^{(4)}
Craca ♀ ^{(5)}	Regnerus ♂ ^{(5)}	Bracus ♂ ^{(5)}	♕ Fridlevus I, the Swift ♂ ^{(4,5)}	Hun, King of the Huns ♂ ^{(5)}	Hun ♂ ^{(5)}
Gøtarus, King of Norway ♂ ^{(5)}	Westmarus ♂ ^{(5)}	Colo ♂ ^{(5)}	Gøtwara ♀ ^{(5)}
Rollerus ♂ ^{(5)}	Ericus the Shrewd-spoken† ♂ ^{(5,6)}	Gunwara the Fair ♀ ^{(5)}	Alvilda ♀ ^{(5)}	♕ Frotho III ♂ ^{(5,6)}	Hanunda ♀ ^{(5)}	Grep (eldest of three) ♂ ^{(5)}	11 other sons (two named Grep) ♂♂ ^{(5)}
Hythin, King of Tellemark ♂ ^{(6)}	Alvo ♂ ^{(5)}	Ofura ♀ ^{(5)}	Arngrimus ♂ ^{(5)}	Grubbus ♂ ^{(6)}	♕ Hiarnus ♂ ^{(6)}	Amundus, King of Norway ♂ ^{(6)}
child of Hythin ^{(6)}	Haldanus† ♂ ^{(6)}	12 sons, including Angantir ♂♂ ^{(5)}	Ano ♂ ^{(6)}	Iuritha ♀ ^{(6)}	♕ Fridlevus II ♂ ^{(6)}	Frogertha ♀ ^{(6)}
Hanevus, King of Saxony ♂ ^{(6)}	Suertingus, King of Saxony ♂ ^{(6)}	Olavus ♂ ^{(6)}	♕ Frotho IV ♂ ^{(6)}
Sywardus† ♂ ^{(6,7)}	sons of Suertingus ♂♂ ^{(6)}	sister of the sons of Suertingus ♀ ^{(6)}	♕ Ingellus ♂ ^{(6,7)}	Helga ♀ ^{(6)}	Helgo ♂ ^{(6)}	Asa ♀ ^{(6)}
three sons that died in war ♂♂ ^{(7)}	♕ Olavus I ♂ ^{(7)}	Karolus, governor of Gothland ♂ ^{(7)}
Ulvilda ♀ ^{(7)}	♕ Frotho V ♂ ^{(7)}	Hatherus ♂ ^{(7)}	♕ Haraldus I ♂ ^{(7)}	Sygne ♀ ^{(7)}
Ericus† ♂ ^{(7)}	Thorhilda ♀ ^{(7)}	♕ Haldanus II Biargrammus† ♂ ^{(7)}	Haraldus ♂ ^{(7)}
Ebbo ♂ ^{(7)}	mother of Otharus ♀ ^{(7)}	♕ Unguinus, King of the Goths ♂ ^{(7)}	Asmundus ♂ ^{(7)}
sister of Otharus ♀ ^{(7)}	♕ Sywaldus I ♂ ^{(7)}	Sygrutha ♀ ^{(7)}	Kings of Norway
Otharus ♂ ^{(7)}	Syritha ♀ ^{(7)}	♕ Sygarus ♂ ^{(7)}

Genealogical information is derived from Oliver Elton's 1905 translation, The First Nine Books of the Danish History of Saxo Grammaticus (via Wikisource). Name spellings are from the 1931 Latin critical edition by Olrik and Ræder (via Wikisource). Regnal numbers, which do not appear in the original text, are included for clarity and taken from the engraving Veræ effigies regum omnium by Erico Olai Tormio.

Legendary titles
Preceded by Sywaldus I	King of Denmark	Succeeded by Haraldus Hyldetan
