= Haki =

Scandinavian sea-king in Norse mythology

Haki, Hake (Old Norse: [ˈhɑke]), Haco, Hako or Aki was a famous Scandinavian sea-king, in Norse mythology. He was the brother of Hagbard. Haki is mentioned in the 12th century Gesta Danorum and Chronicon Lethrense, and in 13th-century sources including Ynglinga saga, Nafnaþulur, and the Völsunga saga.

== Ynglinga saga ==
Snorri Sturluson wrote in the Ynglinga saga that Haki had amassed a great force of warriors and sometimes plundered together with his brother Hagbard (who himself was the hero of one of the most popular legends of ancient Scandinavia, see Hagbard and Signy). When Haki considered that he had amassed enough wealth and followers to make himself the king of Sweden, he proceeded with his army against the Swedish royal seat at Uppsala. Haki was a brutal warrior and he had twelve champions, among whom was the legendary warrior Starkad the Old.

The Swedish king Hugleik had also gathered a large army and was supported by the two champions Svipdag and Geigad.

On the Fyrisvellir (Fyris Wolds), south of Uppsala, there was a great battle in which the Swedish army was defeated. Haki and his men captured the Swedish champions Svipdag and Geigad and then they attacked the 'shield-circle' around the Swedish king and slew him and his two sons.

Haki and his warriors subdued the Swedish provinces and Haki made himself the king of Sweden. Then he happily sat in peace for three years while his warriors travelled far and wide and amassed fortunes.

The previous king, Hugleik, had two cousins named Eric and Jorund, who had become famous by killing Gudlög, the king of Hålogaland. When they learnt that king Haki's champions were gone plundering, they assembled a large force and steered towards Sweden. They were joined by many Swedes who wanted to reinstall the Yngling dynasty on the Swedish throne.

The two brothers entered Mälaren, went towards Uppsala, and landed on the Fyrisvellir. There they were met by king Haki, who had a considerably smaller force. Haki was, however, a brutal enemy who killed many men and lastly Eric, who held the banner of the two brothers. Jorund and his men fled to the ships, but Haki was mortally wounded.

Haki asked for a longship, which was loaded with his dead warriors and their weapons. He had the sails hoisted and set fire to a piece of tar-wood, which he asked to be covered with a pile of wood. Haki was all but dead when he was laid on top of the pile. The wind was blowing towards the water and the ship departed in full flame between the small islands out into the sea. This was much talked about and it gave him great fame.

== Völsunga saga ==
In the Völsunga saga, Gudrun and Brynhild have a discussion on the "greatest of men" referring to a legend now lost, where Haki's sons have not yet avenged their sisters by killing the evil Sigar (the feud with Sigar is still going on and Hagbard has not yet been hanged):

"Good talk," says Gudrun, "let us do even so; what kings deemest thou to have been the first of all men?" Brynhild says, "The sons of Haki, and Hagbard withal; they brought to pass many a deed of fame in the warfare." Gudrun answers, "Great men certes, and of noble fame! Yet Sigar took their one sister, and burned the other, house and all; and they may be called slow to revenge the deed; why didst thou not name my brethren who are held to be the first of men as at this time?"

== Gesta Danorum ==
In Gesta Danorum, Saxo Grammaticus includes two characters named Hako or Haco (the names are used interchangeably for both characters; the form "Hakon" is used in some translations), and aspects of the story of Haki are divided between them. One is the sea-king who fought King Huglecus (Hugleik), the other is the brother of Hagbarthus (Hagbard). The two were briefly allies following the death of Regnaldus, but went their separate ways after the death of Hagbarthus.

=== Hako of Zealand, a sea-king ===
Hako appears in Books 6 and 7 of Gesta Danorum. In Book 6 he is called a "tyrant of Denmark", and in Book 7 he is called a Zealander and the son of Wigerus. He is a highly distinguished viking, and the champion Starcatherus enters his service on multiple occasions. Like Starcatherus, Hako seems to be very long-lived, being introduced in Book 6 during the reign of Frotho IV and still active in Book 7 during the reign of Sigar. (Starcatherus lives even longer, dying in Book 8 during the reign of Omundus.)

In Gesta Danorum, Huglecus is an Irish king. The motivation behind Hako's attack on Huglecus was to show that "even the furthest kingdoms of the world might not be untouched by the Danish arms."

Saxo writes that Starcatherus and Hako brought their fleet to Ireland, where the rich and greedy king Huglecus lived. Huglecus was never generous to an honourable man, but spent all his riches on mimes and jugglers. In spite of his avarice, Huglecus had the great champions Gegathus (Geigad) and Suibdavus (Svipdag). When the battle began, the jugglers and mimes panicked and fled, and only Gegathus and Suibdavus remained to defend Huglecus, but they fought like an entire army. Gegathus dealt Starcatherus a wound on the head which was so severe that Starcatherus would later sing songs about it. Starcatherus killed Huglecus and made the Irish flee. He then had the jugglers and mimes whipped and beaten, in order to humiliate them. Then the Danes brought Huglecus's riches out to Dublin to be publicly looted, and there was so much of it that none cared for its strict division.

=== Hako, the son of Hamundus ===
The other Hako appears only in Book 7 of Gesta Danorum. This Hako was one of four sons of Hamundus (with Hagbarthus, Helwin and Hamundus). Following the death of Regnaldus, a rival who overthrew the Danish king Unguinus and was later defeated by Unguinus's son Sywaldus I, Hako joined the fleet of Hako the sea-king. It is said that Hako the Zealander and Starcatherus were the allies of young Hako from that point "one because he was moved by regard for friendship, the other by regard for his birth".

When Hako learnt that his brother Hagbarthus had been killed by the Danish king Sygarus (son of Sywaldus I), Hako left the company of Hako and Starcatherus and formed an army to avenge his brother. Sygarus was slain at a place called Walbrunna. However, killing Sigar was not enough to satiate his thirst for blood:

Then Hakon used his conquest to cruel purpose, and followed up his good fortune so wickedly, that he lusted for an indiscriminate massacre, and thought no forbearance should be shown to rank or sex. Nor did he yield to any regard for compassion or shame, but stained his sword in the blood of women, and attacked mothers and children in one general and ruthless slaughter.

Sywaldus II, the son of Sygarus, formed an army to have his own vengeance. The two forces fought for two days, and eventually the Danes won. Hakon was chased away by Sywaldus's companion Borcarus, fleeing "in a hasty panic" with three ships to Scotland. He died there two years later. Meanwhile, the entire royal family of the Danes had also died in the conflict, leaving only Guritha, the granddaughter of Sygarus.

The family tree of legendary Kings of the Danes, according to the Gesta Danorum (Books 1 to 7)

Kings of the Danes are marked with a crown (♕). Kings of the Swedes are marked with a dagger (†). Superscript numbers after a name indicate in which books of Gesta Danorum the individual is mentioned.

Humblus ♂ ^{(1)}
KEY
Angul ♂ ^{(1)}	♕ Dan I ♂ ^{(1)}	Grytha ♀ ^{(1)}	Marriage or coupling
Parent and child
The Angles	♕ Humblus ♂ ^{(1)}	♕ Lotherus ♂ ^{(1)}	King of the Saxons ♂ ^{(1)}	Succession by other or unclear means
Roarus ♂ ^{(1)}
Sigtrugus, King of the Swedes† ♂ ^{(1)}	♕ Skioldus ♂ ^{(1)}	Alvilda ♀ ^{(1)}
daughter of Roarus ♀ ^{(1)}	Bessus ♂ ^{(1)}
sister of Gram ♀ ^{(1)}	Gro ♀ ^{(1)}	♕ Gram† ♂ ^{(1)}	Sumblus, King of the Finns ♂ ^{(1)}
Wagnofthus ♂ ^{(1)}
Signe ♀ ^{(1)}	Henricus, King of the Saxons ♂ ^{(1)}	Haquinus, King of the Nitherians ♂ ^{(1)}
Harthgrepa ♀ ^{(1)}
♕Suibdagerus, King of Norway† ♂ ^{(1)}	sister of Guthormus ♀ ^{(1)}	♕Guthormus ♂ ^{(1)}	♕ Hadingus ♂ ^{(1,2,4,5)}	Regnilda ♀ ^{(1)}
Asmundus† ♂ ^{(1)}	Gunnilda ♀ ^{(1)}	Guthormus ♂ ^{(1)}
Ulvilda ♀ ^{(1,2)}	♕ Ubbo ♂ ^{(2)}
Henricus ♂ ^{(1)}	Uffo† ♂ ^{(1)}	Hundingus† ♂ ^{(1,2)}	Thorilda ♀ ^{(2)}	Scottus ♂ ^{(2)}
daughter of Uffo ♀ ^{(1)}	Regnerus† ♂ ^{(2)}	Suanhuita ♀ ^{(2)}	sisters of Suanhuita ♀♀ ^{(2)}	Andwan, King of the Hellespont ♂ ^{(2)}
Thoraldus ♂ ^{(2)}
♕ Frotho I ♂ ^{(2,5)}	daughter of Andwan ♀ ^{(2)}
Hothbrodus† ♂ ^{(2,3)}	♕ Haldanus I ♂ ^{(2)}	Roe ♂ ^{(2)}	Skato ♂ ^{(2)}
Thora ♀ ^{(2)}
♕ Helgo ♂ ^{(2,3)}	♕ Roe ♂ ^{(2)}
Athislus† ♂ ^{(2,3)}	Ursa ♀ ^{(2)}
King Gevarus ♂ ^{(2,3)}	♕ Rolvo Krake† ♂ ^{(2,3)}	Ruta ♀ ^{(2)}	Biarco ♂ ^{(2)}	Sculda ♀ ^{(2)}	♕ Hiarwarthus† ♂ ^{(2,3)}
♕ Hotherus† ♂ ^{(2,3)}	Nanna ♀ ^{(3)}	Herlecus ♂ ^{(3)}	Gericus ♂ ^{(3)}
former King of Britain ♂ ^{(3)}	mother of the King of Britain ♀ ^{(3)}	a slave ♂ ^{(3)}	a bondmaid ♀ ^{(3)}	♕ Roricus Slyngebond ♂ ^{(3)}	Gerwendillus ♂ ^{(3)}
King of Britain ♂ ^{(3,4)}	Queen of Britain ♀ ^{(3,4)}	Gerutha ♀ ^{(3,4)}	Horwendillus ♂ ^{(3,4)}	Fengo ♂ ^{(3,4)}
foster sister of Amlethus ♀ ^{(3,4)}	daughter of the King of Britain ♀ ^{(3,4)}	Amlethus ♂ ^{(3,4)}	Herminthruda, Queen of Scotland ♀ ^{(4)}	♕ Wiglecus ♂ ^{(4)}
son of Amlethus ♂ ^{(4)}	♕Wermundus ♂ ^{(4)}	Frowinus, governor of Sleswik ♂ ^{(4)}
♕ Uffo, aka Olavus the Gentle ♂ ^{(4)}	daughter of Frowin ♀ ^{(4)}	Keto ♂ ^{(4)}	Wigo ♂ ^{(4)}
♕ Dan II ♂ ^{(4)}
♕ Huglecus ♂ ^{(4)}
♕ Frotho II, the Vigorous ♂ ^{(4)}
♕ Dan III ♂ ^{(4)}
Craca ♀ ^{(5)}	Regnerus ♂ ^{(5)}	Bracus ♂ ^{(5)}	♕ Fridlevus I, the Swift ♂ ^{(4,5)}	Hun, King of the Huns ♂ ^{(5)}	Hun ♂ ^{(5)}
Gøtarus, King of Norway ♂ ^{(5)}	Westmarus ♂ ^{(5)}	Colo ♂ ^{(5)}	Gøtwara ♀ ^{(5)}
Rollerus ♂ ^{(5)}	Ericus the Shrewd-spoken† ♂ ^{(5,6)}	Gunwara the Fair ♀ ^{(5)}	Alvilda ♀ ^{(5)}	♕ Frotho III ♂ ^{(5,6)}	Hanunda ♀ ^{(5)}	Grep (eldest of three) ♂ ^{(5)}	11 other sons (two named Grep) ♂♂ ^{(5)}
Hythin, King of Tellemark ♂ ^{(6)}	Alvo ♂ ^{(5)}	Ofura ♀ ^{(5)}	Arngrimus ♂ ^{(5)}	Grubbus ♂ ^{(6)}	♕ Hiarnus ♂ ^{(6)}	Amundus, King of Norway ♂ ^{(6)}
child of Hythin ^{(6)}	Haldanus† ♂ ^{(6)}	12 sons, including Angantir ♂♂ ^{(5)}	Ano ♂ ^{(6)}	Iuritha ♀ ^{(6)}	♕ Fridlevus II ♂ ^{(6)}	Frogertha ♀ ^{(6)}
Hanevus, King of Saxony ♂ ^{(6)}	Suertingus, King of Saxony ♂ ^{(6)}	Olavus ♂ ^{(6)}	♕ Frotho IV ♂ ^{(6)}
Sywardus† ♂ ^{(6,7)}	sons of Suertingus ♂♂ ^{(6)}	sister of the sons of Suertingus ♀ ^{(6)}	♕ Ingellus ♂ ^{(6,7)}	Helga ♀ ^{(6)}	Helgo ♂ ^{(6)}	Asa ♀ ^{(6)}
three sons that died in war ♂♂ ^{(7)}	♕ Olavus I ♂ ^{(7)}	Karolus, governor of Gothland ♂ ^{(7)}
Ulvilda ♀ ^{(7)}	♕ Frotho V ♂ ^{(7)}	Hatherus ♂ ^{(7)}	♕ Haraldus I ♂ ^{(7)}	Sygne ♀ ^{(7)}
Ericus† ♂ ^{(7)}	Thorhilda ♀ ^{(7)}	♕ Haldanus II Biargrammus† ♂ ^{(7)}	♕ Haraldus II ♂ ^{(7)}
Ebbo ♂ ^{(7)}	mother of Otharus ♀ ^{(7)}	♕ Unguinus, King of the Goths ♂ ^{(7)}	Asmundus ♂ ^{(7)}
sister of Otharus ♀ ^{(7)}	♕ Sywaldus I ♂ ^{(7)}	Sygrutha ♀ ^{(7)}	Kings of Norway
Sywardus, King of the Goths ♂ ^{(7)}	mother of Alvilda ♀ ^{(7)}	Otharus ♂ ^{(7)}	Syritha ♀ ^{(7)}	♕ Sygarus ♂ ^{(7)}	queen of Sygarus ♀ ^{(7)}	Hamundus, a petty king ♂ ^{(7)}
Wemundus ♂ ^{(7)}	Ostenus ♂ ^{(7)}	♕ Sywaldus II ♂ ^{(7)}	Algerus ♂ ^{(7)}	Helwin ♂ ^{(7)}	Hamundus ♂ ^{(7)}
Alvilda ♀ ^{(7)}	Alf ♂ ^{(7)}	Sygne ♂ ^{(7)}	Hagbarthus ♂ ^{(7)}	Hako ♂ ^{(7)}
Guritha ♀ ^{(7)}

Genealogical information is derived from Oliver Elton's 1905 translation, The First Nine Books of the Danish History of Saxo Grammaticus (via Wikisource). Name spellings are from the 1931 Latin critical edition by Olrik and Ræder (via Wikisource). Regnal numbers, which do not appear in the original text, are included for clarity and taken from the engraving Veræ effigies regum omnium by Erico Olai Tormio.

== Chronicon Lethrense ==
In the Chronicon Lethrense, Haki (as Aki) killed the usurper Hiarwart within a day of his having taken the royal title from Rolf Kraki. Haki then became king of the Danes. In turn, he was then killed by Fritleff.

The family tree of legendary Kings of the Danes, according to Chronicon Lethrense

Kings of the Danes are marked with a crown (♕).

Ypper, King of Uppsala ♂
KEY
Nori ♂	Østen ♂	♕ Dan ♂	Dannia ♀	Marriage or coupling
Parent and child
Rolfcarl, aka Rolf, a baron ♂	♕ Ro ♂	Ro's wife ♀	Succession by other means
Thora ♀
♕ Helgi ♂	♕ Haldan ♂
Athisl, King of Swethia ♂	Ursula ♀	♕ Raka, a dog ♂
Siward Albus ♂	♕ Snyo ♂
♕ Hiarwart ♂	Sculd ♀	♕ Rolf Kraki ♂
Hamund ♂
♕ Aki ♂	Haghbard ♂	daughter of Rolf Kraki ♀	♕ Fritleff ♂
♕ Frothi Largus ♂
♕ Ingyald ♂
♕ Olav ♂
♕ Asa ♀
♕ Harald Hildetan (war-tooth) ♂
♕ Hethae ♀

The source used for the genealogical information and name spellings is the English translation provided by Mischa Hooker of Augustana College.

Haki House of Yngling
Preceded by Hugleik	Mythological king of Sweden	Succeeded by Jorund
