= Signe (Finnish princess) =

Legendary Finnish princess

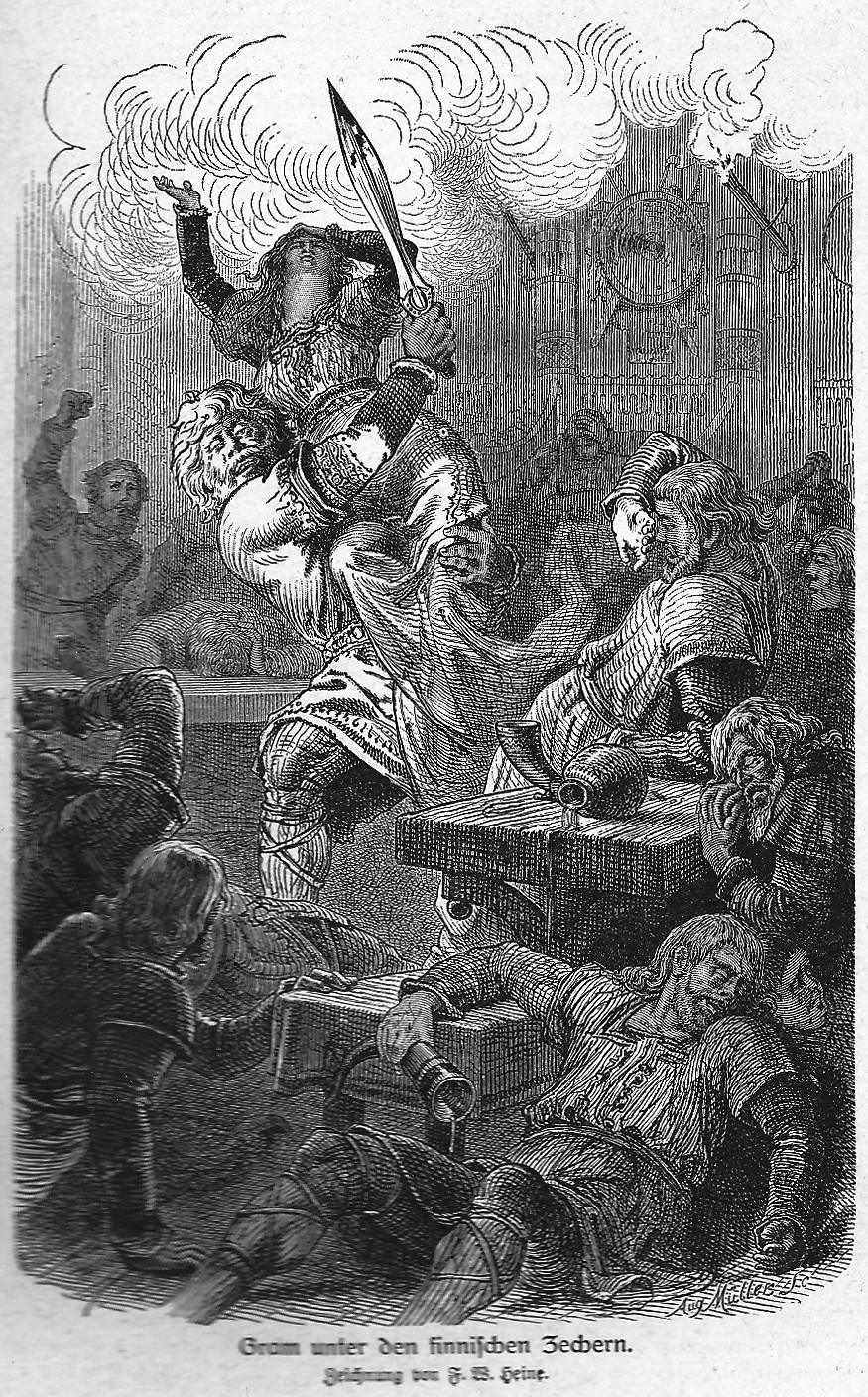

Queen of the Danes
- Predecessor: Gróa
- Consort: Henry; Gram
- Issue: Hading
- Father: Sumble
- Religion: Pagan

Signe was a Finnish princess mentioned in Gesta Danorum. The realm of her father, Sumble was invaded by the Danish king, Gram of Denmark, but after noticing her, Gram halted the invasion and proposed to her. Before the marriage could be arranged, Gram had to go to Sweden, while he was away her father plotted to marry her off to a Saxon king, Henry. Signe, unhappy with his arrangement, informed Gram, causing Gram to murder Henry during their wedding.

== The text ==
Gesta Danorum, Book One
Many other deeds also King Gram did. He declared war against Sumble, King of the Finns; but when he set eyes upon the King's daughter, Signe, he laid down his arms, the foeman turned into the suitor, and, promising to put away his own wife, he plighted troth with her.
Signe had, by Sumble's treachery, been promised in marriage to Henry, King of Saxony. Then, inclining to love the maiden more than his soldiers, he left his army, privily made his way to Finland, and came in upon the wedding, which was already begun.
Now Signe, the daughter of Sumble, vilely spurns me, and endures vows not mine, cursing her ancient troth; and, conceiving an ill-ordered love, commits a notable act of female lightness; for she entangles, lures, and bestains princes, rebuffing beyond all others the lordly of birth; yet remaining firm to none, but ever wavering, and bringing to birth impulses doubtful and divided.
GUTHORM and HADDING, the son of Gram (Groa being the mother of the first and Signe of the second), were sent over to Sweden in a ship by their foster-father, Brage (Swipdag being now master of Denmark), and put in charge of the giants Wagnhofde and Hafle, for guard as well as rearing.

The family tree of legendary Kings of the Danes, according to the Gesta Danorum (Books 1 to 9)

Kings of the Danes are marked with a crown (♕). Kings of the Swedes are marked with a dagger (†). Superscript numbers after a name indicate in which books of Gesta Danorum the individual is mentioned.

Humblus ♂ ^{(1)}
KEY
Angul ♂ ^{(1)}	♕ Dan I ♂ ^{(1)}	Grytha ♀ ^{(1)}	Marriage or coupling
Parent and child
The Angles	♕ Humblus ♂ ^{(1)}	♕ Lotherus ♂ ^{(1)}	King of the Saxons ♂ ^{(1)}	Succession by other or unclear means
Roarus ♂ ^{(1)}
Sigtrugus, King of the Swedes† ♂ ^{(1)}	♕ Skioldus ♂ ^{(1)}	Alvilda ♀ ^{(1)}
daughter of Roarus ♀ ^{(1)}	Bessus ♂ ^{(1)}
sister of Gram ♀ ^{(1)}	Gro ♀ ^{(1)}	♕ Gram† ♂ ^{(1)}	Sumblus, King of the Finns ♂ ^{(1)}
Wagnofthus ♂ ^{(1)}
Signe ♀ ^{(1)}	Henricus, King of the Saxons ♂ ^{(1)}	Haquinus, King of the Nitherians ♂ ^{(1)}
Harthgrepa ♀ ^{(1)}
♕Suibdagerus, King of Norway† ♂ ^{(1)}	sister of Guthormus ♀ ^{(1)}	♕Guthormus ♂ ^{(1)}	♕Hadingus ♂ ^{(1,2,4,5)}	Regnilda ♀ ^{(1)}
Asmundus† ♂ ^{(1)}	Gunnilda ♀ ^{(1)}	Guthormus ♂ ^{(1)}
Ulvilda ♀ ^{(1,2)}	♕ Ubbo ♂ ^{(2)}
Henricus ♂ ^{(1)}	Uffo† ♂ ^{(1)}	Hundingus† ♂ ^{(1,2)}	Thorilda ♀ ^{(2)}	Scottus ♂ ^{(2)}
daughter of Uffo ♀ ^{(1)}	Regnerus† ♂ ^{(2)}	Suanhuita ♀ ^{(2)}	sisters of Suanhuita ♀♀ ^{(2)}	Andwan, King of the Hellespont ♂ ^{(2)}
Thoraldus ♂ ^{(2)}
♕ Frotho I ♂ ^{(2,5)}	daughter of Andwan ♀ ^{(2)}
Hothbrodus† ♂ ^{(2,3)}	♕ Haldanus I ♂ ^{(2)}	Roe ♂ ^{(2)}	Skato ♂ ^{(2)}
Thora ♀ ^{(2)}
♕ Helgo ♂ ^{(2,3)}	♕ Roe ♂ ^{(2)}
Athislus† ♂ ^{(2,3)}	Ursa ♀ ^{(2)}
King Gevarus ♂ ^{(2,3)}	♕ Rolvo Krake† ♂ ^{(2,3)}	Ruta ♀ ^{(2)}	Biarco ♂ ^{(2)}	Sculda ♀ ^{(2)}	♕Hiarwarthus † ♂ ^{(2,3)}
♕ Hotherus† ♂ ^{(2,3)}	Nanna ♀ ^{(3)}	Herlecus ♂ ^{(3)}	Gericus ♂ ^{(3)}
former King of Britain ♂ ^{(3)}	mother of the King of Britain ♀ ^{(3)}	a slave ♂ ^{(3)}	a bondmaid ♀ ^{(3)}	♕ Roricus Slyngebond ♂ ^{(3)}	Gerwendillus ♂ ^{(3)}
King of Britain ♂ ^{(3,4)}	Queen of Britain ♀ ^{(3,4)}	Gerutha ♀ ^{(3,4)}	Horwendillus ♂ ^{(3,4)}	Fengo ♂ ^{(3,4)}
foster sister of Amlethus ♀ ^{(3,4)}	daughter of the King of Britain ♀ ^{(3,4)}	Amlethus ♂ ^{(3,4)}	Herminthruda, Queen of Scotland ♀ ^{(4)}	♕ Wiglecus ♂ ^{(4)}
son of Amlethus ♂ ^{(4)}	♕Wermundus ♂ ^{(4)}	Frowinus, governor of Sleswik ♂ ^{(4)}
♕ Uffo, or Olavus the Gentle ♂ ^{(4)}	daughter of Frowin ♀ ^{(4)}	Keto ♂ ^{(4)}	Wigo ♂ ^{(4)}
♕ Dan II ♂ ^{(4)}
♕ Huglecus ♂ ^{(4)}
♕ Frotho II, the Vigorous ♂ ^{(4)}
♕ Dan III ♂ ^{(4)}
Craca ♀ ^{(5)}	Regnerus ♂ ^{(5)}	Bracus ♂ ^{(5)}	♕ Fridlevus I, the Swift ♂ ^{(4,5)}	Hun, King of the Huns ♂ ^{(5)}	Hun ♂ ^{(5)}
Gøtarus, King of Norway ♂ ^{(5)}	Westmarus ♂ ^{(5)}	Colo ♂ ^{(5)}	Gøtwara ♀ ^{(5)}
Rollerus ♂ ^{(5)}	Ericus the Shrewd-spoken† ♂ ^{(5,6)}	Gunwara the Fair ♀ ^{(5)}	Alvilda ♀ ^{(5)}	♕ Frotho III ♂ ^{(5,6)}	Hanunda ♀ ^{(5)}	Grep (eldest of three) ♂ ^{(5)}	11 other sons (two named Grep) ♂♂ ^{(5)}
Hythin, King of Tellemark ♂ ^{(6)}	Alvo ♂ ^{(5)}	Ofura ♀ ^{(5)}	Arngrimus ♂ ^{(5)}	Grubbus ♂ ^{(6)}	♕ Hiarnus ♂ ^{(6)}	Amundus, King of Norway ♂ ^{(6)}
child of Hythin ^{(6)}	Haldanus† ♂ ^{(6)}	12 sons, including Angantir ♂♂ ^{(5)}	Ano ♂ ^{(6)}	Iuritha ♀ ^{(6)}	♕ Fridlevus II ♂ ^{(6)}	Frogertha ♀ ^{(6)}
Hanevus, King of Saxony ♂ ^{(6)}	Suertingus, King of Saxony ♂ ^{(6)}	Olavus ♂ ^{(6)}	♕ Frotho IV ♂ ^{(6)}
Sywardus† ♂ ^{(6,7)}	sons of Suertingus ♂♂ ^{(6)}	sister of the sons of Suertingus ♀ ^{(6)}	♕ Ingellus ♂ ^{(6,7)}	Helga ♀ ^{(6)}	Helgo ♂ ^{(6)}	Asa ♀ ^{(6)}
three sons that died in war ♂♂ ^{(7)}	♕ Olavus I ♂ ^{(7)}	Karolus, governor of Gothland ♂ ^{(7)}
Ulvilda ♀ ^{(7)}	♕ Frotho V ♂ ^{(7)}	Hatherus ♂ ^{(7)}	♕ Haraldus I ♂ ^{(7)}	Sygne ♀ ^{(7)}
Ericus† ♂ ^{(7)}	Thorhilda ♀ ^{(7)}	♕ Haldanus II Biargrammus† ♂ ^{(7)}	♕Haraldus II ♂ ^{(7)}
Ebbo ♂ ^{(7)}	mother of Otharus ♀ ^{(7)}	♕ Unguinus, King of the Goths ♂ ^{(7)}	Asmundus ♂ ^{(7)}
sister of Otharus ♀ ^{(7)}	♕ Sywaldus I ♂ ^{(7)}	Sygrutha ♀ ^{(7)}	Kings of Norway
Sywardus, King of the Goths ♂ ^{(7)}	mother of Alvilda ♀ ^{(7)}	Otharus ♂ ^{(7)}	Syritha ♀ ^{(7)}	♕ Sygarus ♂ ^{(7)}	queen of Sygarus ♀ ^{(7)}	Hamundus, a petty king ♂ ^{(7)}
Wemundus ♂ ^{(7)}	Ostenus ♂ ^{(7)}	♕Sywaldus II ♂ ^{(7)}	Algerus ♂ ^{(7)}	Helwin ♂ ^{(7)}	Hamundus ♂ ^{(7)}
Regnaldus, King of the Northmen ♂ ^{(7)}	Alvilda ♀ ^{(7)}	Alf ♂ ^{(7)}	Sygne ♂ ^{(7)}	Hagbarthus ♂ ^{(7)}	Hako ♂ ^{(7)}
Gro ♀ ^{(7)}	Borcarus ♂ ^{(7)}	Drota ♀ ^{(7)}	Gunnarus ♂ ^{(7)}	Hano, ruler of Funen ♂ ^{(7)}	Ostmarus, ruler of Scania ♂ ^{(7)}	Hundingus, ruler of Zealand ♂ ^{(7)}	Roricus, co-ruler of Jutland ♂ ^{(7)}	Hatherus, co-ruler of Jutland ♂ ^{(7)}
Haraldus ♂ ^{(7)}	Hildigerus ♂ ^{(7)}	Røtho, a Ruthenian pirate ♂ ^{(7)}	Wesetus ♂
♕Haldanus III ♂ ^{(7)}	Guritha ♀ ^{(7)}
Alverus† ♂ ^{(7,8)}	♕ Haraldus III Hyldetan ♂ ^{(7)}
Olavus ♂ ^{(7)}	Ingo ♂ ^{(7)}	Ingeldus† ♂ ^{(7)}	sister of Haraldus ♀ ^{(7)}	Ubbo ♂ ^{(7)}	sister of Haraldus ♀ ^{(7)}	Sywardus ♂ ^{(7)}	sister of Haraldus ♀ ^{(7)}	Olavus, king of the Werms ♂ ^{(7)}
♕ Ringo I† ♂ ^{(7,8)}	♕ Hetha ♀ ^{(8)}	♕ Olo the Vigorous ♂ ^{(7,8)}	Esa ♀ ^{(7)}	son of the king ♂ ^{(7,8)}
Atylo the Scanian ♂ ^{(8)}	Ringo, ruler of Norway ♂ ^{(8)}
Tola ♂ ^{(8)}	Omothus, or Homothus ♂ ^{(8)}	daughter of Ringo ♀ ^{(8)}	Esa ♀ ^{(8)}	♕ Omundus ♂ ^{(7,8)}
Sibbo ♂ ^{(8)}	sister of Gøtarus ♀ ^{(8)}	Gøtarus† ♂ ^{(8)}	daughter of Omundus ♀ ^{(8)}	♕ Sywardus I ♂ ^{(8)}	♕ Buthlus ♂ ^{(8)}	daughter of Omundus ♀ ^{(8)}
Ebbo ♂ ^{(8)}
early wife of Iarmericus ♀ ^{(8)}	♕Iarmericus † ♂ ^{(8)}	Suanilda ♀ ^{(8)}	the Hellepontines, 4 brothers ♂♂ ^{(8)}	Iarmericus' sister, sold to Norwegians ♀ ^{(8)}	Iarmericus' sister, sold to Germans ♀ ^{(8)}
♕ Broderus ♂ ^{(8)}	nephews of Iarmericus ♂♂ ^{(8)}
King of the Goths ♂ ^{(8)}	♕ Sywaldus III ♂ ^{(8)}
King of Sweden† ♂ ^{(8)}	daughter of the King of the Goths ♀ ^{(8)}	♕ Snio ♂ ^{(8)}
♕ Biorn ♂ ^{(8)}
♕ Haraldus III ♂ ^{(8)}
a queen from Sweden ♀ ^{(8)}	♕ Gormo I ♂ ^{(8)}
♕ Gotricus, or Godefridus ♂ ^{(8,9)}
♕ Olavus III ♂ ^{(9)}	daughter of Gotricus ♀ ^{(9)}	Sywardus, King of Norway ♂ ^{(9)}	unknown
♕Hemmingus ♂ ^{(9)}	♕Siwardus II Ring ♂ ^{(9)}	♕ Ringo II ♂ ^{(9)}	Herothus† ♂ ^{(9)}	Hesbernus ♂ ^{(9)}
ruler in Norway ♂ ^{(9)}	Lathgertha ♀ ^{(9)}	♕Regnerus Lothbrog ♂ ^{(9)}	Thora ♀ ^{(9)}
Suanlogha ♀ ^{(9)}	a woman ♀ ^{(9)}
2 daughters ♀♀ ^{(9)}	Fridlevus ♂ ^{(9)}	♕ Haraldus ♂ ^{(9)}	♕ Siwardus & Ericus ♂♂ ^{(9)}	Rathbarthus ♂ ^{(9)}	Dunwatus ♂ ^{(9)}	Ubbo ♂ ^{(9)}
Regnaldus ♂ ^{(9)}	Withsercus ♂ ^{(9)}	Ericus Wind-hat ♂ ^{(9)}	Guthormus ♂ ^{(9)}	♕ Ericus I ♂ ^{(9)}	♕ Sywardus Snake-Eye ♂ ^{(9)}	Biornus ♂ ^{(9)}	Agnerus ♂ ^{(9)}	Ivarus ♂ ^{(9)}
daughter of Guthormus ♀ ^{(9)}	♕ Ericus II ♂ ^{(9)}
♕ Kanutus I ♂ ^{(9)}
♕ Frotho VI ♂ ^{(9)}
♕ Gormo II the English ♂ ^{(9)}
♕ Haraldus V ♂ ^{(9)}	Hedelradus, King of England ♂ ^{(9)}
♕ Gormo III ♂ ^{(9)}	Thira ♀ ^{(9)}
Kanutus ♂ ^{(9)}	Haraldus VI ♂ ^{(9)}

Genealogical information is derived from Oliver Elton's 1905 translation, The First Nine Books of the Danish History of Saxo Grammaticus (via Wikisource). Name spellings are from the 1931 Latin critical edition by Olrik and Ræder (via Wikisource). Regnal numbers, which do not appear in the original text, are included for clarity and taken from the engraving Veræ effigies regum omnium by Erico Olai Tormio.
