= Jorund =

Legendary Swedish king

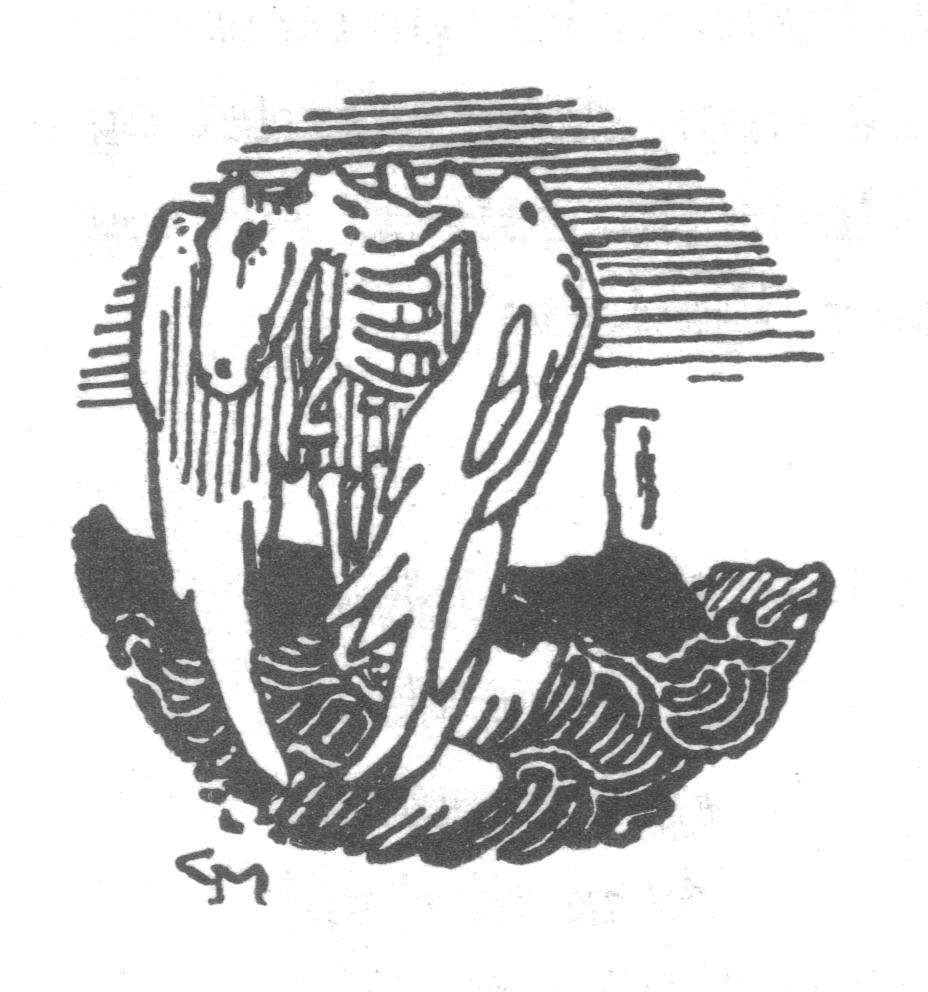
Illustration by Gerhard Munthe (1899)

Jorund or Jörundr (5th century) was a Swedish king of the House of Yngling. He was the son of Yngvi, and he had reclaimed the throne of Sweden for his dynasty from Haki (the brother of Hagbard, the hero of the legend of Hagbard and Signy. Snorri cites two kennings from this legend, Sigar's steed and Hagard's fell noose, when telling of Jorund).

Snorri Sturluson relates that when Jorund was young he used to travel the seas and plunder with his brother Erik, and they were great warriors. One summer they plundered in Denmark where they met another pillager, King Gudlög of Hålogaland (a province in Norway) with whom they fought. They took him prisoner and carried him ashore at Stromones where they hanged him. Gudlaug's surviving companions raised a mound over him there.

Snorri then cites the poem Háleygjatal by a Norwegian skald named Eyvindr skáldaspillir:

En Guðlaugr grimman tamdi við ofrkapp austrkonunga Sigars jó, er synir Yngva menglötuð við meið reiddu. Og náreiðr á nesi drúpir vingameiðr, þar er víkur deilir, þar er fjölkunnt um fylkis hreyr steini merkt, Straumeyjarnes.	By the fierce East-kings' cruel pride, Gudlog must on the wild horse ride -- The wildest horse you e'er did see: 'Tis Sigur's steed – the gallows tree. At Stromones the tree did grow, Where Gudlog's corpse waves on the bough. A high stone stands on Stromo's heath, To tell the gallant hero's death.

This act rendered the Swedish princes, Eric and Jorund, even more famous and they were thought of as even greater men. When they learnt that King Haki no longer had his forces around him, they decided to take care of their enemy. They assembled a large force that was joined by Swedes as they approached. They entered Mälaren (a bay at the time) and steered towards Uppsala. They left their ships at the Fyris Wolds and were met by Haki who had fewer men. Haki was a brutal fighter and managed to turn the tide of the battle. He slew Erik who held the banner and Jorund retreated with his men. Haki had been seriously wounded and died.

Jorund then ruled Sweden at Uppsala, but he usually spent the summers pillaging. One summer, he plundered in Jutland and entered Limfjorden, where he continued the pillaging. They anchored in Oddesund (before a storm in 1825, it was near the innermost part of the fjord and almost 200 km from its mouth) but were discovered by the Norwegian pirate Gylaug of Hålogaland, the son of Gudlaug. Gylaug and his men attacked them and were joined by local forces who wanted revenge. As Jorund was vastly outnumbered (and had to run an almost 200 km long gauntlet to get out of the fjord), he lost the battle, and Gylaug had him hanged.

Snorri illustrates this event with the stanza from Ynglingatal:

Varð Jörundr hinn er endr of dó, lífs of lattr í Limafirði, þá er hábrjóstr hörva Sleipnir bana Goðlaugs of bera skyldi; ok Hagbarðs hersa valdi höðnu leif at halsi gekk.	Jorund has travelled far and wide, But the same horse he must bestride On which he made brave Gudlog ride. He too must for a necklace wear Hagbert's fell noose in middle air. The army leader thus must ride On Horva's horse, at Lymfjord's side.

The Historia Norwegiæ presents a Latin summary of Ynglingatal, older than Snorri's quotation, continuing after Yngvi (called Ingialdr):

Post hunc filius ejus Jorundr, qui cum Danos debellasset, ab eisdem suspensus in loco Oddasund in sinu quodam Daciæ, quem Limafiorth indiginæ appellant, male vitam finivit. Iste genuit Auchun (i.e. Aun) [...]

After him his son Jorund ruled, who ended his days unhappily once he had fought a war against the Danes, who hanged him at Oddesund, on an arm of the sea in Denmark which the natives call Limfjorden. He became the father of Aukun, [...]

The even earlier source Íslendingabók also cites the line of descent in Ynglingatal and it gives the same line of succession: xiiii Yngvi. xv Jörundr. xvi Aun inn gamli.

The Skjöldunga saga and the Bjarkarímur tell that Jorund was defeated by the Danish king Fróði (corresponds to the Heaðobard Froda in Beowulf), who made him a tributary and took his daughter. The daughter gave birth to Halfdan, but another woman became Fróði's legitimate wife and gave him an heir named Ingjaldr (corresponds to the Heaðobard Ingeld in Beowulf). Together with one of his earls, Swerting, Jorund conspired against Fróði and killed him during the blót.

== Primary sources ==
- Ynglingatal
- Ynglinga saga (part of the Heimskringla)
- Historia Norwegiae
- Skjöldunga saga
- Bjarkarímur

== Secondary sources ==
Nerman, B. Det svenska rikets uppkomst. Stockholm, 1925.

Jorund House of Yngling
Preceded by Haki	Mythological king of Sweden	Succeeded by Aun
