= Ingeld =

Legendary warrior in Beowulf

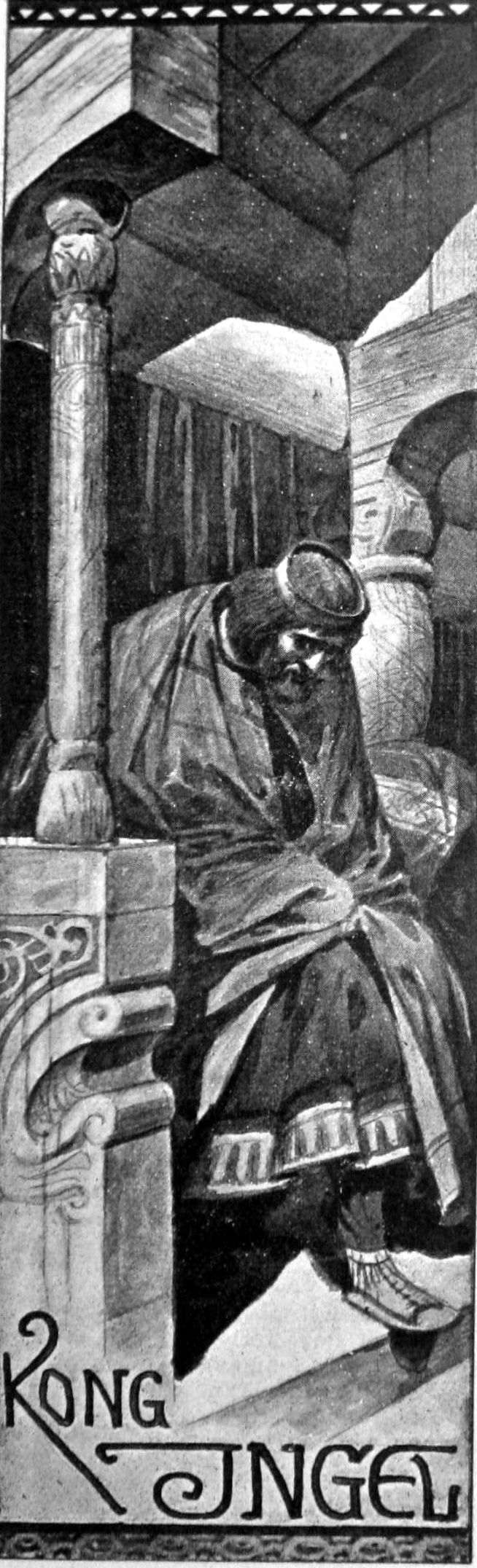
An 1898 illustration of King Ingeld (Norwegian: Kong Ingel) by Louis Moe

Ingeld or Ingjaldr (Old Norse: [ˈiŋɡjɑldz̠]; Latin: Hinieldus) was a legendary warrior who appears in early English and Norse legends. Ingeld was so well known that, in AD 797, Alcuin wrote a letter to Bishop Higbald of Lindisfarne questioning the monks' interest in heroic legends with: "Quid enim Hinieldus cum Christo?" ('What has Ingeld to do with Christ?')

The legends that survive tell of Ingeld as an enemy of Hroðgar, Halga and Hroðulf. The conflict between the Scyldings Hroðgar and Hroðulf on one side, and the Heaðobards Froda and Ingeld on the other, appears both in Beowulf and in Widsith. Scholars generally agree that these characters appear in both Anglo-Saxon (Beowulf) and Scandinavian tradition (Norse sagas and Danish chronicles). However, in the Norse tradition the Heaðobards had apparently been forgotten and the conflict is instead rendered as a family feud, or as a conflict with the Saxons, where the Danes take the place of the Heaðobards.

== Attestations ==
=== Beowulf ===
In Beowulf, Ingeld is the son of King Froda of the Heaðobards, and they are involved in a war with the Danes. When Beowulf reports on his adventure in Denmark to his king Hygelac, he mentions that Hroðgar had a daughter, Freawaru. Since Froda had been killed by the Danes, Hroðgar sent Freawaru to marry Ingeld, in an unsuccessful attempt to end the feud. An old warrior urged the Heaðobards to revenge, and Beowulf predicts to Hygelac that Ingeld will turn against his father-in-law Hroðgar. In a version given in the Danish chronicle Gesta Danorum (see below), the old warrior appears as Starkad, and he succeeded in making Ingeld divorce his bride and in turning him against her family. Earlier in the Beowulf poem, the poet tells us that the hall Heorot was eventually destroyed by fire (Gummere's translation):

Sele hlīfade hēah and horn-gēap: heaðo-wylma bād, lāðan līges; ne wæs hit lenge þā gēn þæt se ecg-hete āðum-swerian æfter wæl-nīðe wæcnan scolde.	....there towered the hall, high, gabled wide: it awaited the hot surge of furious flame. Nor far was that day when the war between father and son-in-law after cruel slaughter would awake again.

It is tempting to interpret the new war with Ingeld as leading to the burning of the hall of Heorot, but the poem separates the two events (by a ne wæs hit lenge þā meaning "nor far way was that day when", in Gummere's translation).

Family tree of the Scyldings (Kings of the Danes), Heathobards and Scylfings (Kings of the Swedes), according to Beowulf

♕ Heremod
♕ Scyld Scefing
♕ Beowulf
♕ Healfdene	♕ Ongentheow
♕ Heorogar	♕ Hrothgar	Wealhtheow	Halga	A daughter	♕ Onela	♕ Ohthere
Heoroweard	Hrethric	Hrothmund	Hrothulf	Froda	Eanmund	Eadgils
Freawaru	Ingeld

=== Widsith ===
Whereas Beowulf never dwells on the outcome of the battle with Ingeld, the possibly older poem Widsith refers to Hroðgar and Hroðulf defeating Ingeld at Heorot:

Hroþwulf ond Hroðgar heoldon lengest sibbe ætsomne suhtorfædran, siþþan hy forwræcon wicinga cynn ond Ingeldes ord forbigdan, forheowan æt Heorote Heaðobeardna þrym.	Hroðulf and Hroðgar held the longest peace together, uncle and nephew, since they repulsed the race of Vikings and bent down Ingeld’s spear-point; they crushed at Heorot the Heaðobard force.

=== Skjöldunga saga and Bjarkarímur ===
The Skjöldunga saga and Bjarkarímur reverse the relationship between Froda and Ingeld by making Ingeld (Ingjaldus) the father of Froda (Frodo). Moreover, Ingeld is here described as the half-brother of Healfdene (Haldan).

Frodo defeated the Swedish king Jorund, made him a tributary and took his daughter. The daughter gave birth to Haldan, but another woman became Frodo's legitimate wife and gave him Ingjaldus. Together with one of his earls, Swerting, Jorund conspired against Frodo and killed him during the blót.

Haldan has a queen named Sigrith with whom he has three children: the sons Roas (Hroðgar) and Helgo (Halga) and the daughter Signy. Ingjaldus is jealous with his half-brother and so he attacks and kills Haldan, whereupon he marries Sigrith. Ingjaldus and Sigrith have two sons named Rærecus and Frodo. Ingjaldus, who is worried that his nephews would want revenge, tries to find them and kill them, but Roas and Helgo survive by hiding on an island near Skåne. When they are old enough, they avenge their father by killing Ingjaldus.

In the Hrólfr Kraki's saga, which tells very much the same story, it is Froda (Fróði) who is the half brother of Halfdan.

=== Gesta Danorum ===
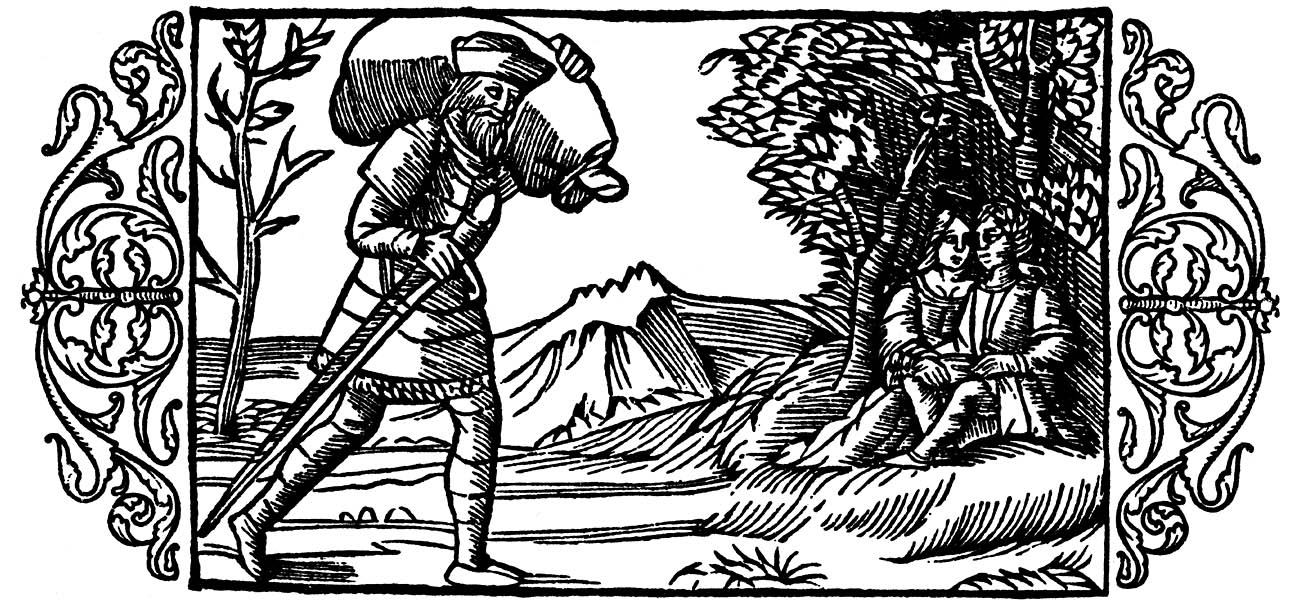
Starkad meets Ingellus with a mistress, from Olaus Magnus' Historia de gentibus septentrionalibus (1555).

The tradition of the feud with the Heaðobards Ingeld and Froda appears twice in the Gesta Danorum. There is also a third time, based on the account of the old warrior who restarts the conflict.

The first time it tells of the feud is book 2, where Ingeld (called Ingild) appears with the son Agnar. In this version, Ingeld's son is about to marry Hroðulf's sister Rute, but a fight starts and Agnar dies in a duel with Böðvarr Bjarki (called Biarco).

The second version in Gesta Danorum (book 6), concerns the adventures of Starkad, and which is based on the old warrior who restarted the conflict. The Danish king Frotho (Froda) was killed through treachery by a Saxon named Swerting (Swertingus). Frotho's son Ingeld (Ingellus) lived a wanton life and married one of Swerting's daughters. This angered Starkad so much that he enlisted at the Swedish king Halfdan's (Haldanus) court instead. As Ingeld continued his sinful life and did not do his duty to avenge his father, Starkad appeared during a banquet that Ingeld had with the sons of Swerting, his father's slayer. Starkad strongly admonished Ingeld and humiliated his queen who tried to calm Starkad with kindness and her costly ribbon. Starkad succeeded in inciting Ingeld to kill Swerting's sons and to divorce his Saxon bride.

The third time, it tells of Froda and Ingeld is in book 7, but here Hroðgar is replaced by a Harald and Halga by a Haldanus. It is the same Ingeld as in the previous paragraph, but here Froda reappears as Ingeld's son. It is a version of the feud that is similar to the one told in the Skjöldunga saga, Bjarkarímur and Hrólfr Kraki's saga, where the Heaðobards had been forgotten and the feud with Froda and Ingeld has become a family feud. The main plot is that Ingeld has the sons Frodo (Froda) and Harald (corresponds to Healfdene). The relationship between Ingeld and Froda was thus reversed, a reversal also found in the Skjöldunga saga and in the Bjarkarímur. Froda kills his brother and tries to get rid of his nephews Harald (corresponds to Hroðgar) and Haldanus (corresponds to Halga). After some adventures, the two brothers burn their uncle to death inside his house and avenge their father.

The family tree of legendary Kings of the Danes, according to the Gesta Danorum (Books I to VII)

Kings of the Danes are in bold and marked with a crown (♕). Kings of the Swedes are marked with a dagger (†). Superscript numbers before a name indicate in which books of Gesta Danorum the individual is mentioned.

^{(1)} Humble
KEY
^{(1)} Angul	^{(1)} **Dan** ♕	^{(1)} Grytha	Marriage or coupling
Parent and child
The Angles	^{(1)} **Humble** ♕	^{(1)} **Lother** ♕	^{(1)} King of the Saxons	Succession by other or unclear means
^{(1)} Roar
^{(1)} Sigtryg, King of the Swedes†	^{(1)} **Skiold** ♕	^{(1)} Alfhild
^{(1)} daughter of Roar	^{(1)} Bess
^{(1)} sister of Gram	^{(1)} Gróa	^{(1)} **Gram** ♕†	^{(1)} Sumble, King of the Finns
^{(1)} Wagnhofde
^{(1)} Signe	^{(1)} Henry, King of the Saxons	^{(1)} Hakon, King of the Nitherians
^{(1)} Hardgrep
^{(1)} **Swipdag** ♕†, King of Norway	^{(1)} sister of Guthorm	^{(1)} **Guthorm** ♕	^{(1,2,5)} **Hadding** ♕	^{(1)} Ragnhild
^{(1)} Asmund†	^{(1)} Gunnhild	^{(1)} Guthorm
^{(1,2)} Ulfhild	^{(2)} **Ubbe** ♕
^{(1)} Henry	^{(1)} Uffe†	^{(1,2)} Hunding†	^{(2)} Thorhild	^{(2)} Scot
^{(1)} daughter of Uffe	^{(2)} Ragnar†	^{(2)} Swanhwid	^{(2)} sisters of Swanhwid	^{(2)} Handwan
^{(2)} Thorwald
^{(2,5)} **Frode** ♕	^{(2)} daughter of Handwan
^{(2,3)} Hothbrodd†	^{(2)} **Halfdan** ♕	^{(2)} Ro	^{(2)} Skat
^{(2)} Thora
^{(2,3)} **Helge** ♕	^{(2)} **Ro** ♕
^{(2,3)} Athisl†	^{(2)} Urse
^{(2,3)} King Gewar	^{(2,3)} **Rolf** Krage ♕†	^{(2)} Rute	^{(2)} Bjarke	^{(2)} Skulde	^{(2,3)} **Hiartuar** †♕
^{(2,3)} **Hother** †♕	^{(3)} Nanna	^{(3)} Herlek	^{(3)} Gerit
^{(3)} former King of Britain	^{(3)} mother of the King of Britain	^{(3)} a slave	^{(3)} a bondmaid	^{(3)} **Rorik** Slyngebond ♕	^{(3)} Gerwendil
^{(3,4)} King of Britain	^{(3,4)} Queen of Britain	^{(3,4)} Gerutha	^{(3,4)} Horwendil	^{(3,4)} Feng
^{(3,4)} foster sister of Amleth	^{(3,4)} daughter of the King of Britain	^{(3,4)} Amleth	^{(4)} Hermutrude, Queen of Scotland	^{(4)} **Wiglek** ♕
^{(4)} son of Amleth	^{(4)} **Wermund** ♕	^{(4)} Frowin, governor of Sleswik
^{(4)} **Uffe** ♕, aka Olaf the Gentle	^{(4)} daughter of Frowin	^{(4)} Ket	^{(4)} Wig
^{(4)} **Dan** ♕
^{(4)} **Hugleik** ♕
^{(4)} **Frode** the Vigorous ♕
^{(4)} **Dan** ♕
^{(5)} Kraka	^{(5)} Ragnar	^{(5)} Brak	^{(4,5)} **Fridleif** the Swift ♕	^{(5)} Hun, King of the Huns	^{(5)} Hun
^{(5)} Gotar, King of Norway	^{(5)} Westmar	^{(5)} Koll	^{(5)} Gotwar
^{(5)} Roller	^{(5,6)} Erik† Shrewd-spoken	^{(5)} Gunwar the Fair	^{(5)} Alfhild	^{(5,6)} **Frode** ♕	^{(5)} Hanund	^{(5)} Grep (eldest of three)	^{(5)} 11 other sons (two named Grep)
^{(6)} Hythin, King of Tellemark	^{(5)} Alf	^{(5)} Eyfura	^{(5)} Arngrim	^{(6)} Grubb	^{(6)} **Hiarn** ♕	^{(6)} Amund, King of Norway
^{(6)} child of Hythin	^{(6)} Halfdan†	^{(5)} 12 sons, including Anganty	^{(6)} Ane	^{(6)} Juritha	^{(6)} **Fridleif** ♕	^{(6)} Frogertha
^{(6)} Hanef, King of Saxony	^{(6)} Swerting, King of Saxony	^{(6)} Olaf	^{(6)} **Frode** ♕
^{(6,7)} Siward†	^{(6)} sons of Swerting	^{(6)} sister of the sons of Swerting	^{(6,7)} **Ingild** ♕	^{(6)} Helga	^{(6)} Helge	^{(6)} Asa
^{(6,7)} Frode	^{(6,7)} Fridleif	^{(6,7)} Ingild	^{(6,7)} **Olaf** ♕	^{(7)} Karl, governor of Gothland
^{(7)} Ulfhild	^{(7)} **Frode** ♕	^{(7)} Hather, a chief	^{(7)} **Harald** ♕	^{(7)} Signe
^{(7)} Erik†	^{(7)} Thorhild	^{(7)} **Halfdan** Biargramm ♕†	^{(7)} Harald
^{(7)} Asmund
Kings of Norway

Name spellings are derived from Oliver Elton's 1905 translation, The First Nine Books of the Danish History of Saxo Grammaticus, via Wikisource.

=== Codex Runicus ===
Ingeld appears in the Kongetal (King's List) and Runekrønike (Runic Chronicle) sections of the Codex Runicus. These are broadly consistent with the history presented in Gesta Danorum. In Kongetal, Ingæld (ᛁᚿᚵᛅᛚᛑ) is the son of Froþe the Hard and the father of Olaf (ᚮᛚᛆᚠ). Ingæld's queen (corresponding to the Saxon daughter of Swerting from Gesta Danorum) is named Swærtæ (ᛋᚡᛅᚱᛐᛅ). In Runekrønike, it is said that, during the reign of Inggiæld (ᛁᚿᚵᚵᛁᛅᛚᛑ), Starkad killed the seven sons of Suærting (ᛋᚢᛅᚱᛐᛁᚿᚵ).

The family tree of legendary Kings of the Danes, according to the Kongetal section of Codex Runicus

Kings are marked with a crown (♕).

Uiþlef ᚢᛁᚦᛚᛅᚠ
KEY
♕ Værmund ᚡᛅᚱᛘᚢᚿᛑ	Marriage or coupling
Parent and child
♕ Uffi hin Starke (the Strong) ᚢᚠᚠᛁ
♕ Dan ᛑᛆᚿ	♕ Huþlef or Hughlek ᚼᚢᚦᛚᛅᚠ or ᚼᚢᚵᚼᛚᛅᚴ
♕ Froþe hin Storlætne ᚠᚱᚮᚦᛅ
♕ Dan hin Dahfulli ᛑᛆᚿ
♕ Friþlef ᚠᚱᛁᚦᛚᛅᚠ	Falka ᚠᛆᛚᚴᛆ
♕ Froþe hin Friþgoþe ᚠᚱᚮᚦᛅ	Ulvild ᚢᛚᚡᛁᛚᛑ
♕ Friþlef ᚠᚱᛁᚦᛚᛅᚠ	Eriþa ᛅᚱᛁᚦᛆ
♕ Froþe hin Harþe (the Hard) ᚠᚱᚮᚦᛅ
♕ Ingæld ᛁᚿᚵᛅᛚᛑ	Swærtæ ᛋᚡᛅᚱᛐᛅ
♕ Olaf ᚮᛚᛆᚠ
♕ Froþe hin Frøkne ᚠᚱᚮᚦᛅ	Allofþ ᛆᛚᛚᚮᚠᚦ
Þorilda ᚦᚮᚱᛁᛚᛑᛆ	♕ Haldan ᚼᛆᛚᛑᛆᚿ	♕ Hiþing hin Høueske (the Proper) ᚼᛁᚦᛁᚿᚵ	Hilda ᚼᛁᛚᛑᛆ

Name spellings are derived from the edited version of the text into Latin letters by Marita Akhøj Nielsen (2015) and runes are from the digitised manuscript Am 28 8vo at the University of Copenhagen.

== Sources ==
- Nerman, Birger (1925). "Det svenska rikets uppkomst".
- Beowulf:
- Beowulf read aloud in Old English
  - Modern English translation by Francis Barton Gummere
  - Modern English translation by John Lesslie Hall
  - Ringler, Dick. Beowulf: A New Translation For Oral Delivery, May 2005. Searchable text with full audio available, from the University of Wisconsin-Madison Libraries.
  - Several different Modern English translations
- Widsith:
  - Widsith, A Verse Translation by Douglas B. Killings
  - Widsith, a translation by Bella Millett
- Chronicon Lethrense and Annales Lundense:
  - Chronicon Lethrense and Annales Lundenses in translation by Peter Tunstall
  - The same translation at Northvegr
- Gesta Danorum:
  - Book 2 of Gesta Danorum at the Online Medieval & Classical library
  - Book 6 of Gesta Danorum at the Online Medieval & Classical library
  - Book 7 of Gesta Danorum at the Online Medieval & Classical library
- The Relation of the Hrolfs Saga Kraka and the Bjarkarimur to Beowulf by Olson, 1916, at Project Gutenberg
- Hrólf Kraki's saga in English translation at Northvegr

Legendary titles
Preceded by Frotho IV	King of Denmark	Succeeded by Olavus I
