= Swerting =

Beowulf character

Swerting (Proto-Norse *Swartingaz ) is briefly mentioned in Beowulf, where he had a son or son-in-law, Hrethel, who was the maternal grandfather of the hero Beowulf.

== The Heaðobard tradition ==
A Swerting of the same timeframe also appears in Scandinavian traditions as the killer of a Danish king named Fróði/Frotho, who corresponds to Froda, the Heaðobard, in Beowulf. In the Scandinavian traditions, Froda's son Ingeld also appears with the name forms Ingjald or Ingellus.

=== Skjöldunga saga and Bjarkarímur ===
The Skjöldunga saga and the Bjarkarímur tell that the king of Sweden, Jorund, was defeated by the Danish king Fróði, who made him a tributary and took his daughter. The daughter gave birth to Halfdan, but another woman became Fróði's legitimate wife and gave him an heir named Ingjaldr. Together with one of his earls, Swerting, Jorund conspired against Fróði and killed him during the blót.

=== Gesta Danorum ===
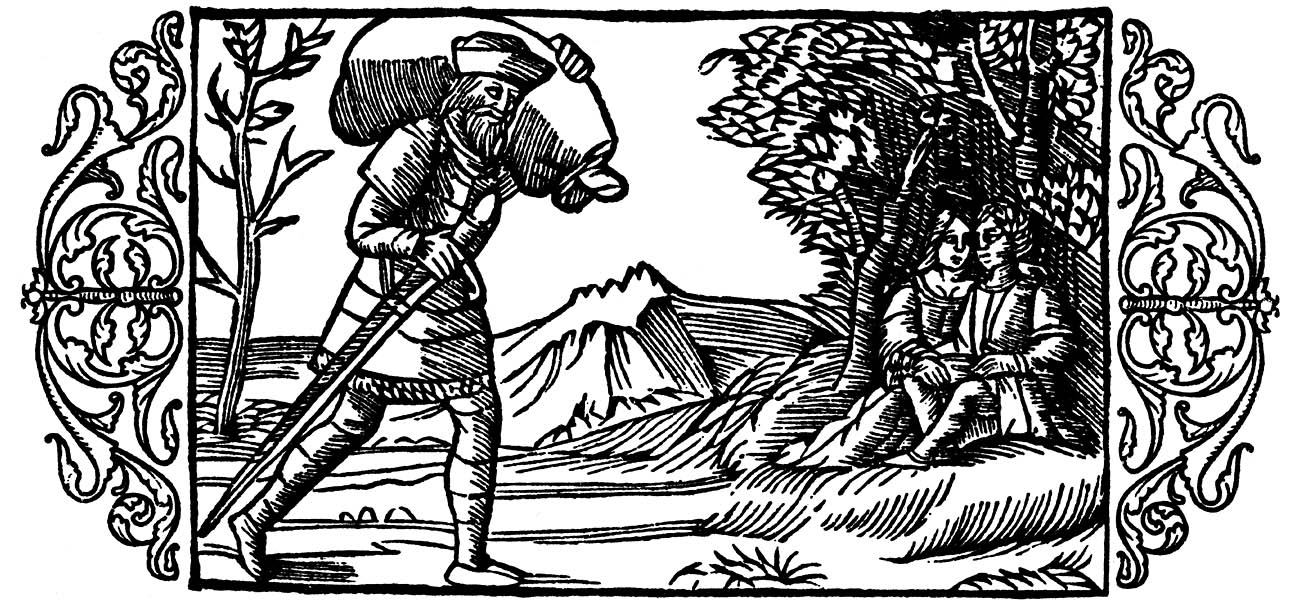
Starkad meets Ingellus with a mistress (probably Swerting's daughter), from Olaus Magnus' Historia de gentibus septentrionalibus (1555).

There is also a second version in Gesta Danorum, concerning the adventures of Starkad, and which is based on the old warrior who restarted the conflict between the Heaðobards and the Danes. The Danish king Frotho (Froda) was killed through treachery by a Saxon named Swerting (Swertingus) (cf. the Swedish earl, above). Frotho's son Ingellus (Ingeld) lived a wanton life and married one of Swerting's daughters. This angered Starkad so much that he enlisted at the Swedish king Halfdan's (Haldanus) court instead. As Ingellus continued his sinful life and did not do his duty to avenge his father, Starkad appeared during a banquet that Ingellus had with the sons of Swerting, his father's slayer. Starkad strongly admonished Ingellus and humiliated his queen who tried to calm Starkad with kindness and her costly ribbon. Starkad succeeded in exciting Ingellus to kill Swerting's sons and to divorce his Saxon bride.

The family tree of legendary Kings of the Danes, according to the Gesta Danorum (Books I to VII)

Kings of the Danes are in bold and marked with an asterisk (*). Kings of the Swedes are marked with a dagger (†). Superscript numbers before a name indicate in which books of Gesta Danorum the individual is mentioned.

^{(1)} Humble
KEY
^{(1)} Angul | ^{(1)} **Dan*** | ^{(1)} Grytha | Marriage or coupling
Parent and child
The Angles | ^{(1)} **Humble*** | ^{(1)} **Lother*** | ^{(1)} King of the Saxons | Succession by other or unclear means
^{(1)} Roar
^{(1)} Sigtryg, King of the Swedes† | ^{(1)} **Skiold*** | ^{(1)} Alfhild
^{(1)} daughter of Roar | ^{(1)} Bess
^{(1)} sister of Gram | ^{(1)} Gróa | ^{(1)} **Gram***† | ^{(1)} Sumble, King of the Finns
^{(1)} Wagnhofde
^{(1)} Signe | ^{(1)} Henry, King of the Saxons | ^{(1)} Hakon, King of the Nitherians
^{(1)} Hardgrep
^{(1)} **Swipdag***†, King of Norway | ^{(1)} sister of Guthorm | ^{(1)} **Guthorm*** | ^{(1,2,5)} **Hadding*** | ^{(1)} Ragnhild
^{(1)} Asmund† | ^{(1)} Gunnhild | ^{(1)} Guthorm
^{(1,2)} Ulfhild | ^{(2)} **Ubbe***
^{(1)} Henry | ^{(1)} Uffe† | ^{(1,2)} Hunding† | ^{(2)} Thorhild | ^{(2)} Scot
^{(1)} daughter of Uffe | ^{(2)} Ragnar† | ^{(2)} Swanhwid | ^{(2)} sisters of Swanhwid | ^{(2)} Handwan
^{(2)} Thorwald
^{(2,5)} **Frode*** | ^{(2)} daughter of Handwan
^{(2,3)} Hothbrodd† | ^{(2)} **Halfdan*** | ^{(2)} Ro | ^{(2)} Skat
^{(2)} Thora
^{(2,3)} **Helge*** | ^{(2)} **Ro***
^{(2,3)} Athisl† | ^{(2)} Urse
^{(2,3)} King Gewar | ^{(2,3)} **Rolf***† Krage | ^{(2)} Rute | ^{(2)} Bjarke | ^{(2)} Skulde | ^{(2,3)} **Hiartuar**†*
^{(2,3)} **Hother**†* | ^{(3)} Nanna | ^{(3)} Herlek | ^{(3)} Gerit
^{(3)} former King of Britain | ^{(3)} mother of the King of Britain | ^{(3)} a slave | ^{(3)} a bondmaid | ^{(3)} **Rorik*** | ^{(3)} Gerwendil
^{(3,4)} King of Britain | ^{(3,4)} Queen of Britain | ^{(3,4)} Gerutha | ^{(3,4)} Horwendil | ^{(3,4)} Feng
^{(3,4)} foster sister of Amleth | ^{(3,4)} daughter of the King of Britain | ^{(3,4)} Amleth | ^{(4)} Hermutrude, Queen of Scotland | ^{(4)} **Wiglek***
^{(4)} son of Amleth | ^{(4)} **Wermund*** | ^{(4)} Frowin, governor of Sleswik
^{(4)} **Uffe***, aka Olaf the Gentle | ^{(4)} daughter of Frowin | ^{(4)} Ket | ^{(4)} Wig
^{(4)} **Dan***
^{(4)} **Hugleik***
^{(4)} **Frode*** the Vigorous
^{(4)} **Dan***
^{(5)} Kraka | ^{(5)} Ragnar | ^{(5)} Brak | ^{(4,5)} **Fridleif*** the Swift | ^{(5)} Hun, King of the Huns | ^{(5)} Hun
^{(5)} Gotar, King of Norway | ^{(5)} Westmar | ^{(5)} Koll | ^{(5)} Gotwar
^{(5)} Roller | ^{(5,6)} Erik† Shrewd-spoken | ^{(5)} Gunwar the Fair | ^{(5)} Alfhild | ^{(5,6)} **Frode*** | ^{(5)} Hanund | ^{(5)} Grep (eldest of three) | ^{(5)} 11 other sons (two named Grep)
^{(6)} Hythin, King of Tellemark | ^{(5)} Alf | ^{(5)} Eyfura | ^{(5)} Arngrim | ^{(6)} Grubb | ^{(6)} **Hiarn*** | ^{(6)} Amund, King of Norway
^{(6)} child of Hythin | ^{(6)} Halfdan† | ^{(5)} 12 sons, including Anganty | ^{(6)} Ane | ^{(6)} Juritha | ^{(6)} **Fridleif*** | ^{(6)} Frogertha
^{(6)} Hanef, King of Saxony | ^{(6)} Swerting, King of Saxony | ^{(6)} Olaf | ^{(6)} **Frode***
^{(6,7)} Siward† | ^{(6)} sons of Swerting | ^{(6)} sister of the sons of Swerting | ^{(6,7)} **Ingild*** | ^{(6)} Helga | ^{(6)} Helge | ^{(6)} Asa
^{(6,7)} Frode | ^{(6,7)} Fridleif | ^{(6,7)} Ingild | ^{(6,7)} **Olaf*** | ^{(7)} Karl, governor of Gothland
^{(7)} Ulfhild | ^{(7)} **Frode*** | ^{(7)} Hather, a chief | ^{(7)} **Harald*** | ^{(7)} Signe
^{(7)} Erik† | ^{(7)} Thorhild | ^{(7)} **Halfdan***† Biargramm | ^{(7)} Harald
^{(7)} Asmund
Kings of Norway

Name spellings are derived from Oliver Elton's 1905 translation, The First Nine Books of the Danish History of Saxo Grammaticus, via Wikisource.

=== Historia Brittonum ===
The pedigree of king Aella of Deira given in Historia Brittonum includes the name "Sguerthing" as great-grandfather of the king, and this has been interpreted as a reference to the Swerting of Beowulf. The name does not appear in other versions of the royal pedigree and may represent an attempt by the author of Historia Brittonum to interpose this heroic character into the royal pedigree.

== Notes and references ==
Legendary titles
| Preceded by Yngve or Yngwin? | King of the Geats | Succeeded by Hreðel |

Hrethlings

Swerting (Note: The relationship between Swerting and Hreðel is not clear from the poem. He may also have been his father, or his brother-in-law.)
daughter | Hreðel
Herebeald | Hæþcyn | Hygelac | daughter | Ecgþeow
Hygd | Beowulf
Heardred | daughter | Eofor
