= Alaric and Eric =

Mythological Swedish kings

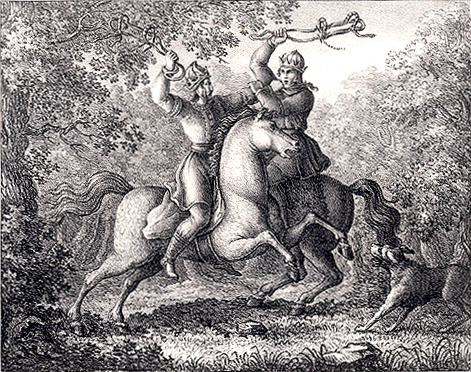
Alaric and Eric fighting with their horse bridles as imagined by a 19th-century artist

Alaric and Eric (Old Norse: Alrekr and Eiríkr), according to legend, were two kings of Sweden.

== In the Ynglinga saga ==
According to the Ynglinga saga, Alaric and Eric were sons and heirs of the previous king Agni. They shared the kingship. They were mighty both in war and sport, but were especially skillful horsemen and vied with one another about their horsemanship and their horses.

One day they rode off from their retinue and did not return. They were found dead with their heads battered but no weapons with them save the bridle bits of their horses. Accordingly it was believed that they had quarreled and come to blows and had slain each other with their bridle bits. They were succeeded by Alaric's sons Yngvi and Alf.

However, in other sources, only Alaric died, and in the piece of Ynglingatal quoted by Snorri Sturluson it is only Alaric who dies explicitly. Eric's death seems to be a misunderstanding on Snorri's part due to an influence from the succeeding kings (see also the other sources below):

| Fell Alrekr, þar er Eiríki bróður vápn at bana urðu, ok hnakkmars með höfuðfetlum Dags fríendr of drepask kváðu; frá-at maðr áðr eykja greiði Freys afspring í folk hafa. | Alric fell, by Eric slain, Eric's life-blood dyed the plain, Brother fell by brother's hand; And they tell it in the land, That they worked the wicked deed With the sharp bits that guide the steed. Shall it be said of Frey's brave sons, The kingly race, the noble ones, That they have fought in deadly battle With the head-gear of their cattle? |

Ynglingatal then gives Yngvi and Alf as Alrek's and Eirík's successors.

The Historia Norwegiæ presents a Latin summary of Ynglingatal, older than Snorri's quotation:

Qui [Dagr] genuit Alrik; hunc frater suus Erikr freno percussit ad mortem. Alricr autem genuit Hogna [...]

This man [Dag] engendered Alrek, who was beaten to death with a bridle by his brother, Eirik. Alrek was father to Agne, [...]

Hogna is an error for Agne. Unlike Ynglingatal, Historia Norwegiæ gives Dagr as Alrekr's predecessor. Instead Alrekr precedes Agne and Agne is succeeded by Yngvi (incorrectly called Ingialdr). The even earlier source Íslendingabók cites the line of descent in Ynglingatal and it gives the same line of succession as Historia Norwegiæ: xi Dagr. xii Alrekr. xiii Agni. xiiii Yngvi.

== In Gautreks saga and Hrólfs saga Gautrekssonar ==
Gautreks saga also makes Alrek and Eirík sons of Agni by Skjálf and co-kings and it was to them that the warrior Starkad fled after his slaying of King Vikar. Starkad served them first as a companions on their viking expeditions and then, after Alrek and Eirík had settled down, went on further Viking expeditions alone.

But King Alrek had a short life, for Eirík struck Alrek dead with a bridle when they were out to train their horses and then ruled as sole ruler over Sweden. This version says that Eirík reigned for a long time as told in Hrólfs saga Gautrekssonar (Saga of Hrólf son of Gautrek).

This second saga introduces Thornbjörg, the daughter of King Eirík and Queen Ingigerd, who was a skillful shieldmaiden and ruled over part of the kingdom. Thornbjörg even called herself King Thorberg. But eventually she fell in love with Hrólf son of Gautrek and agreed to marry him, at which point she gave up her weapons to her father King Eirík and took up embroidery.

== In Gesta Danorum ==
Saxo Grammaticus in Book 5 of his Gesta Danorum introduces Ericus Desertus, that is Erik the Eloquent, son of a champion named Regnerus (Ragnar), both Norwegians in the service of King Gøtarus (Götar) of Norway, a monarch otherwise unknown. This Erik is likely to be the Eirík the Eloquent or Eiríkr the Wise in Speech mentioned by Snorri Sturluson in the Skáldskaparmál as being of Ylfing lineage. But he otherwise has left no clear record in surviving Norse literature.

Saxo makes up for it by telling at great length of Erik's amusing deeds. He relates how Erik outwitted all foes with clever tricks and became the counselor of Fróði son of Fridleif, king of Denmark. Erik's expeditions on Fróði's behalf always went well because of Erik's cunning and way with words. Erik finally married Fróði's sister Gunvara and Erik's elder half-brother Rollerus (Roller) was made king of Norway.

Saxo then brings in a king of the Swedes named Alricus (Alrik) who corresponds to Alrek of the Norse tradition. Alrik was at war with Gestiblindus king of the Gautar (Geats) and Gestiblindus now sought Fróði's aid. (In the Norse Hervarar saga Gestumblindi is the name assumed by the disguised Odin and it is possible that this Gestiblindus is also Odin in disguise.)

Erik and Skalk the Scanian pursued the war and slew Alrik's son Gunthiovus (Old Norse Gunnþjófr) leader of the men of Vermland and Solongs. Then occurred a parley and secret interview between Alrik and Erik in which Alrik attempted to win Erik over to his cause. When this failed, Alrik asked that the war be settled by a single combat between himself and Gestiblindus. Erik refused the offer because of Gestiblind's unfitness and advanced years but made a counter-offer to fight such a duel with Alrik himself if Alrik were willing. The fight occurred straightaway. Alrik was slain and Erik seemed to be fatally wounded so that a report actually came to King Fróði that Erik was dead. Indeed Erik was long in recovering. However Fróði was disabused when Erik himself returned announcing that Fróði was now also king of Sweden, Värmland, Helsingland, and Soleyar. Fróði then gave all those lands to Erik to rule directly and also gave Erik the two Laplands, Finland, and Estonia as dependencies paying annual tribute.

Saxo explains that this Erik was the first Swedish king to be called Erik but that after him it became a very common name among the Swedish kings. He also writes that Erik met and helped the champion Arngrim, an account that agrees with Hervarar saga, where Arngrim's sons meet Erik's successor Yngvi (see e.g. Angantyr and Hjalmar).

That the duel occurred at the end of a "secret interview" suggests that Alrik and Erik were alone when they fought just as were their counterparts in the Norse accounts. That Erik was believed to have died suggests knowledge of the Ynglinga saga version in which both fighters met their death. There is no mention of horse bridles. But Erik is not elsewhere a great duelist or champion but instead a trickster who wins through stratagems and deceiving words so that is it likely that Saxo or his source passed over a stratagem in which a horse bridle played a part.

Saxo also mentions Starkad's stay in Sweden in Book 6 in a summary of Starkad's life up to that point in his history. But Saxo does not indicate what king or kings then ruled Sweden, saying only:

... he went into the land of the Swedes, where he lived at leisure for seven years' space with the sons of Frø.

Frø is of course the god Frey, the ancestor of the Swedish dynasty.

At the beginning of Book 6, Saxo notes that Erik died of a disease and was succeeded by his son Haldanus (Halfdan). Halfdan was later slain by rivals for the throne but the warrior Starkad established Halfdans' heir Siward as the new king. Siward's daughter Signe was married to King Harald of Denmark who was co-king his brother Fróði. Later Harald's son Halfdan, now king of Denmark, slew Siward in war. But Siward's grandson Erik, the son of Halfdan's uncle Fróði by Signe, the direct heir to the throne, now rose up against Halfdan. After a long war this second Erik was captured by Haldfan and left in the woods in chains to be devoured by beasts. With him, it seems, the Swedish line of Erik the Eloquent, as set forth by Saxo, came to an end.

The family tree of legendary Kings of the Danes, according to the Gesta Danorum (Books I to VII)

Kings of the Danes are in bold and marked with a crown (♕). Kings of the Swedes are marked with a dagger (†). Superscript numbers before a name indicate in which books of Gesta Danorum the individual is mentioned.

^{(1)} Humble
KEY
^{(1)} Angul | ^{(1)} **Dan** ♕ | ^{(1)} Grytha | Marriage or coupling
Parent and child
The Angles | ^{(1)} **Humble** ♕ | ^{(1)} **Lother** ♕ | ^{(1)} King of the Saxons | Succession by other or unclear means
^{(1)} Roar
^{(1)} Sigtryg, King of the Swedes† | ^{(1)} **Skiold** ♕ | ^{(1)} Alfhild
^{(1)} daughter of Roar | ^{(1)} Bess
^{(1)} sister of Gram | ^{(1)} Gróa | ^{(1)} **Gram** ♕† | ^{(1)} Sumble, King of the Finns
^{(1)} Wagnhofde
^{(1)} Signe | ^{(1)} Henry, King of the Saxons | ^{(1)} Hakon, King of the Nitherians
^{(1)} Hardgrep
^{(1)} **Swipdag** ♕†, King of Norway | ^{(1)} sister of Guthorm | ^{(1)} **Guthorm** ♕ | ^{(1,2,5)} **Hadding** ♕ | ^{(1)} Ragnhild
^{(1)} Asmund† | ^{(1)} Gunnhild | ^{(1)} Guthorm
^{(1,2)} Ulfhild | ^{(2)} **Ubbe** ♕
^{(1)} Henry | ^{(1)} Uffe† | ^{(1,2)} Hunding† | ^{(2)} Thorhild | ^{(2)} Scot
^{(1)} daughter of Uffe | ^{(2)} Ragnar† | ^{(2)} Swanhwid | ^{(2)} sisters of Swanhwid | ^{(2)} Handwan
^{(2)} Thorwald
^{(2,5)} **Frode** ♕ | ^{(2)} daughter of Handwan
^{(2,3)} Hothbrodd† | ^{(2)} **Halfdan** ♕ | ^{(2)} Ro | ^{(2)} Skat
^{(2)} Thora
^{(2,3)} **Helge** ♕ | ^{(2)} **Ro** ♕
^{(2,3)} Athisl† | ^{(2)} Urse
^{(2,3)} King Gewar | ^{(2,3)} **Rolf** Krage ♕† | ^{(2)} Rute | ^{(2)} Bjarke | ^{(2)} Skulde | ^{(2,3)} **Hiartuar** †♕
^{(2,3)} **Hother** †♕ | ^{(3)} Nanna | ^{(3)} Herlek | ^{(3)} Gerit
^{(3)} former King of Britain | ^{(3)} mother of the King of Britain | ^{(3)} a slave | ^{(3)} a bondmaid | ^{(3)} **Rorik** ♕ | ^{(3)} Gerwendil
^{(3,4)} King of Britain | ^{(3,4)} Queen of Britain | ^{(3,4)} Gerutha | ^{(3,4)} Horwendil | ^{(3,4)} Feng
^{(3,4)} foster sister of Amleth | ^{(3,4)} daughter of the King of Britain | ^{(3,4)} Amleth | ^{(4)} Hermutrude, Queen of Scotland | ^{(4)} **Wiglek** ♕
^{(4)} son of Amleth | ^{(4)} **Wermund** ♕ | ^{(4)} Frowin, governor of Sleswik
^{(4)} **Uffe** ♕, aka Olaf the Gentle | ^{(4)} daughter of Frowin | ^{(4)} Ket | ^{(4)} Wig
^{(4)} **Dan** ♕
^{(4)} **Hugleik** ♕
^{(4)} **Frode** the Vigorous ♕
^{(4)} **Dan** ♕
^{(5)} Kraka | ^{(5)} Ragnar | ^{(5)} Brak | ^{(4,5)} **Fridleif** the Swift ♕ | ^{(5)} Hun, King of the Huns | ^{(5)} Hun
^{(5)} Gotar, King of Norway | ^{(5)} Westmar | ^{(5)} Koll | ^{(5)} Gotwar
^{(5)} Roller | ^{(5,6)} Erik† Shrewd-spoken | ^{(5)} Gunwar the Fair | ^{(5)} Alfhild | ^{(5,6)} **Frode** ♕ | ^{(5)} Hanund | ^{(5)} Grep (eldest of three) | ^{(5)} 11 other sons (two named Grep)
^{(6)} Hythin, King of Tellemark | ^{(5)} Alf | ^{(5)} Eyfura | ^{(5)} Arngrim | ^{(6)} Grubb | ^{(6)} **Hiarn** ♕ | ^{(6)} Amund, King of Norway
^{(6)} child of Hythin | ^{(6)} Halfdan† | ^{(5)} 12 sons, including Anganty | ^{(6)} Ane | ^{(6)} Juritha | ^{(6)} **Fridleif** ♕ | ^{(6)} Frogertha
^{(6)} Hanef, King of Saxony | ^{(6)} Swerting, King of Saxony | ^{(6)} Olaf | ^{(6)} **Frode** ♕
^{(6,7)} Siward† | ^{(6)} sons of Swerting | ^{(6)} sister of the sons of Swerting | ^{(6,7)} **Ingild** ♕ | ^{(6)} Helga | ^{(6)} Helge | ^{(6)} Asa
^{(6,7)} Frode | ^{(6,7)} Fridleif | ^{(6,7)} Ingild | ^{(6,7)} **Olaf** ♕ | ^{(7)} Karl, governor of Gothland
^{(7)} Ulfhild | ^{(7)} **Frode** ♕ | ^{(7)} Hather, a chief | ^{(7)} **Harald** ♕ | ^{(7)} Signe
^{(7)} Erik† | ^{(7)} Thorhild | ^{(7)} **Halfdan** Biargramm ♕† | ^{(7)} Harald
^{(7)} Asmund
Kings of Norway

Name spellings are derived from Oliver Elton's 1905 translation, The First Nine Books of the Danish History of Saxo Grammaticus, via Wikisource.

== Commentary ==
It is not clear whether or not the accounts in the Gesta Danorum and the accounts in the Ynglinga saga' tales of a Danish king named Halfdan who became king of Sweden are at all related.

Traditions of twin brothers connected with horses appear are a commonplace in Indo-European cultures as are foundation legends about two twin brothers, one of whom kills the other. It is possible that Alrek and Eirik are reflexes of such traditions.

Saxo's identification of the legendary Eirík the Eloquent with the legendary Swedish king Eirík probably originated as a flourish by a pro-Danish or pro-Norwegian story teller.

== Secondary sources ==
- Nerman, B. Det svenska rikets uppkomst. Stockholm, 1925.

Alaric and Eric House of Yngling
| Preceded by Agne | List of legendary kings of Sweden | Succeeded by Yngvi and Alf |
