= Bjarkarímur =

Bjarkarímur is a 15th-century Icelandic rímur cycle on the Skjöldungs (the Scyldings of Beowulf), and retells among other things the adventures of Hróarr (Hroðgar) and his brother Helgi (Halga), and those of Böðvarr Bjarki. It appears to be based on the lost Skjöldunga saga and is one of the extant sources of information on that work.
