= Hámundr =

Sea-king, viking pirate

Hámundr is a minor character in Norse mythology.

Hámundr is known for two roles. He was the son of Sigmund and the brother of Sigurd, Helgi Hundingsbane and Sinfjötli. He is apparently the same character as the father of Haki and Hagbard, two legendary sea-kings. His son Hagbard fell in love with Signy, a relative of Sigmund's enemy Siggeir (see Hagbard and Signy).

== Appearances ==
Hámundr makes only a cameo appearance in the Poetic Edda, figuring only in "Frá dauða Sinfjötla", where his family is discussed. According to this passage, he was the youngest of the three sons of Sigmund, "king over Frankland"; his oldest brother was Sinfjötli, and Helgi was the middle of the three.

Hámundr's role in the Völsunga saga is similarly minimal. He is mentioned by Brynhildr, speaking of Haki and Hagbard as his sons.

In Saxo's Gesta Danorum book 7, he is referred to as a petty king and as the father of Hagbard and Haki, and of two other sons who were killed early in the feud with Sigar, Helwin and Hamund (a namesake of his father's).
