= Scylding =

Danish clan

A mention of Scyldings in the Beowulf in the genitive plural

The Scyldings (OE Scyldingas) or Skjǫldungs (ON Skjǫldungar), both meaning "descendants of Scyld/Skjǫldr", were, according to legends, a clan or dynasty of Danish kings, that in its time conquered and ruled Denmark and Sweden together with part of England, Ireland and North Germany. The name is explained in many texts, such as Friedrich Christoph Dahlmann's 'Research on the Field of History' (German: Forschungen auf dem Gebiete der Geschichte), by the descent of this family from an eponymous king Scyld, but the title is sometimes applied to rulers who purportedly reigned before him, and the supposed king may be an invention to explain the name. There was once a Norse saga on the dynasty, the Skjöldunga saga, but it survives only in a Latin summary by Arngrímur Jónsson.

== Descent from Sceaf ==
According to Anglo-Saxon legends recounted in Widsith and other sources such as Æthelweard (Chronicon), the earliest ancestor of Scyld was a culture-hero named Sceaf, who was washed ashore as a child in an empty boat, bearing a sheaf of wheat. This is said to have occurred on an island named Scani or Scandza (Scania), and according to William of Malmesbury (Gesta regum Anglorum) he was later chosen as King of the Angles, reigning from Schleswig. His descendants became known as Scefings, or more usually Scyldings (after Sceldwea). Snorri Sturluson adopted this tradition in his Prologue to the Prose Edda, giving Old Norse forms for some of the names. The following list gives the supposed pedigree.

Anglo-Saxon	Old Norse	Comments
Sceaf	Seskef	
Bedwig	Beðvigr	
Hwala		
Hraþra	Annarr	
Itermon	Ítrmaðr	
Heremod	Hermóðr	Banished by his subjects and fled to the Jutes; later betrayed and murdered.
Sceldwea	Skjǫldr	in Beowulf as Scyld ('shield'), or Scyld Scefing.
Beaw	Bjárr	His name means 'barley', and he has been associated with the later figure of John Barleycorn.
Tætwa		
Geat	Játr (Gautr)	Said by Asser (Vita Ælfredi regis Angul Saxonum) to have been a god. Eponymous ancestor of the Geats and/or Jutes
Godwulf	Goðólfr	
Finn	Finnr	
Friþuwulf		
Frealáf	Friðleifr	
Fréawine		
Friþuwald		
Woden	Óðinn	

== From Skjöld to Halfdan ==
Tree according to Gesta Danorum

The number, names, and order of the Skjöldung kings vary greatly in different texts until one comes to Halfdan/Healfdene.

All Old English texts call Scyld's son and successor Beaw or some similar name. (The name was expanded to Beowulf in the poem Beowulf, probably in error by a scribe who thought it was an abbreviation for the name of the poem's hero, who is quite a different person). Halfdan/Healfdene seems to be the direct son of Beaw in the poem. But all Scandinavian sources that mention both Skjöld and Halfdan put Halfdan some generations after Skjöld and make no mention of King Beaw (save for a genealogy in the Prologue to Snorri Sturluson's Edda which is taken from English traditions).

According to Saxo Grammaticus' Gesta Danorum (Book 1), Skjöld was succeeded by a son named Gram. Since gram is also a simple adjective meaning "fierce" and a common kenning for "king", it might be that Saxo or a source has misunderstood some account referring to Beaw as being gram or a gram and wrongly taken it here as a personal name. Saxo has much to tell of this Gram who becomes the father of Hadingus of whom he has even more to relate, Hadingus in turn becomes the father of a king Frotho I who is father of Haldanus I.

Snorri Sturluson in his Edda, along with some other Old Norse texts, makes Skjöld to be father of Fridleif father of Fróði under whose reign the world was at peace. Snorri mentions this Fróði son of Fridleif in the Ynglinga saga also. But in this work Snorri also introduces a second, later Fróði, said to be son of certain Dan Mikilláti. The second Fróði is known both as Fróði Mikilláti and Fróði the Peace-lover and looks suspiciously like a duplicate of the other peaceful Fróði. Snorri makes this second Fróði the father of Halfdan and of another son named Fridleif.

Saxo in Books 4–5, long after the reign of Halfdan and the fall of the Skjöldung dynasty, also introduces a king named Dan, the third king with that name in his account, whose son is Fridleif whose son is Fróði under whose reign the world achieves peace. This Fróði is also the father of a son named Fridleif according to Saxo.

There are other differing accounts of Halfdan's ancestors. The names, number, and order of legendary Danish kings are very inconsistent in extant texts and it would appear that different writers and story tellers differently arranged what tales of legendary Danish kings they knew in whatever order seemed best to them.

== Halfdan and his descendants ==
In all accounts Halfdan is father of Helgi (called Halga in Beowulf) and Hróar (called Hrothgar in Beowulf). Helgi is father of the famous Hrólf Kraki (called Hrothulf in Beowulf). In Beowulf, another son of Healfdene/Halfdan named Heorogar is father of Heoroweard who corresponds to Hjörvard in the Old Norse accounts where Hjörvard's parentage is not told. The Old Norse accounts make Hjörvard to be the husband of Hrólf's sister and tell how Hjörvard rebelled against King Hrólf and burned him in his hall. But Hjörvard was himself soon slain and with him the rule of the Skjöldung dynasty ended.

== Other Skjöldungar ==
A later lineage said to be of Skjöldung descent:

- Halfdan the Valiant
- Ivar Vidfamne
- Harald Hildetand
- Östen Beli

== See also ==
- Beowulf and Hrólf Kraki
- Rurik Dynasty, a possible branch of the Scyldings in the Garðaríki (allegedly through Rorik of Dorestad)
- Skjoldungen Island
- Uí Ímair, a possible British/Irish branch of the Scyldings
