= Hagbard =

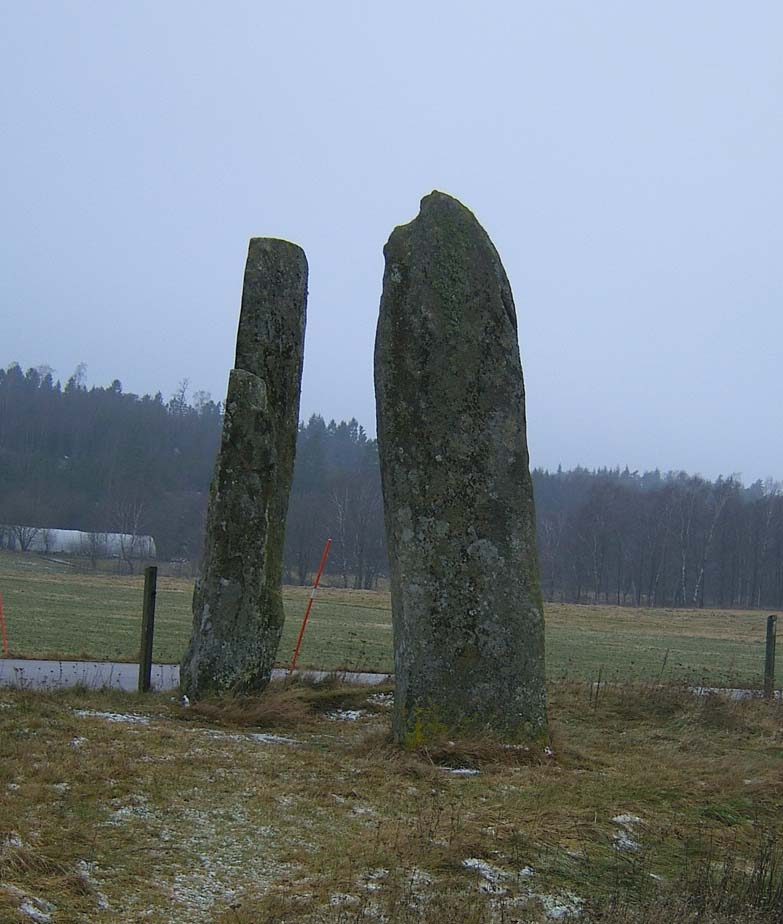
"Hagbard's gallows", a megalithic monument in Asige, Halland, Sweden

Hagbard (Old Norse: Hagbarðr [ˈhɑɣˌbɑrðz̠]), the brother of Haki and son of Hamund, was a famous Scandinavian sea-king in Norse mythology. He is mentioned in Skáldskaparmál, Ynglinga saga, Nafnaþulur, Völsunga saga and Gesta Danorum. The heroes' connections with other legendary characters place the events in the 5th century AD.

Hagbard remained well-known until recent times in the legend of Hagbard and Signy. This famous legend tells that Hagbard fell in love with Signy, the daughter of king Sigar, the nephew of king Siggeir (of the Völsunga saga), a love affair which ended in their deaths, when Sigar wanted to have Hagbard hanged. This legend is told most fully in Gesta Danorum (book 7).

However, most legends surrounding Hagbard are probably lost. In the Völsunga saga, Gudrun and Brynhild have a discussion on the "greatest of men" referring to a legend now lost, where Hagbard is mentioned together with Haki's sons, who have not yet avenged their sisters by killing the evil Sigar (the feud with Sigar is still going on and Hagbard not yet hanged):

"Good talk," says Gudrun, "let us do even so; what kings deemest thou to have been the first of all men?" Brynhild says, "The sons of Haki, and Hagbard withal; they brought to pass many a deed of fame in the warfare." Gudrun answers, "Great men certes, and of noble fame! Yet Sigar took their one sister, and burned the other, house and all; and they may be called slow to revenge the deed; why didst thou not name my brethren who are held to be the first of men as at this time?"

Snorri Sturluson wrote in the Ynglinga saga that Hagbard occasionally plundered together with his brother Haki. Concerning, the adventures and death of the Swedish king Jorund (whom Snorri makes a successor of Haki), he cites the poem Háleygjatal by a Norwegian skald named Eyvindr skáldaspillir containing the Kenning Sigar's steed referring to the legend of Hagbard and Signy:

En Guðlaugr grimman tamdi við ofrkapp austrkonunga Sigars jó, er synir Yngva menglötuð við meið reiddu. Og náreiðr á nesi drúpir vingameiðr, þar er víkur deilir, þar er fjölkunnt um fylkis hreyr steini merkt, Straumeyjarnes.	By the fierce East-kings' cruel pride, Gudlog must on the wild horse ride -- The wildest horse you e'er did see: 'Tis Sigur's steed -- the gallows tree. At Stromones the tree did grow, Where Gudlog's corpse waves on the bough. A high stone stands on Stromo's heath, To tell the gallant hero's death.

The same kenning appears with Hagbard's name in a stanza from Ynglingatal, which Snorri also quotes in the same section:

Varð Jörundr hinn er endr of dó, lífs of lattr í Limafirði, þá er hábrjóstr hörva Sleipnir bana Goðlaugs of bera skyldi; ok Hagbarðs hersa valdi höðnu leif at halsi gekk.	Jorund has travelled far and wide, But the same horse he must bestride On which he made brave Gudlog ride. He too must for a necklace wear Hagbert's fell noose in middle air. The army leader thus must ride On Horva's horse, at Lymfjord's side.
