= Handwan =

Legendary king of the Hellespont

King of the Hellespont
- Religion: Pagan

Handwan was a king of Hellespont mentioned in Gesta Danorum. Having lost the war against the Curonians, exiled Prince Hading attacked Handwan's kingdom and eventually captured and ransomed him. Hading used the ransom money to fund the liberation of his kingdom from the Swedish usurper.

Later, Hading's son Frotho I also attacked Handwan's city. Frotho infiltrated the city through trickery by disguising himself as a shieldmaiden deserter and then opening the gates from inside. Rather than surrender his royal wealth, Handwan put his treasures onto a ship and scuttled it. Instead, Frotho therefore requested the hand of Handwan's daughter in marriage. Handwan's courtly response pleased Frotho and ensured that Handwan's city remained independent.

Handwan would have resided in the City of "Duna", which happens to be the Germanic name for Daugava and near Curonia.

== Text ==
Gesta Danorum, Book One
So he assailed **Handwan**, king of the Hellespont, who was entrenched behind an impregnable defence of wall in his city Duna, and withstood him not in the field, but with battlements. Its summit defying all approach by a besieger, he ordered that the divers kinds of birds who were wont to nest in that spot should be caught by skilled fowlers, and he caused wicks which had been set on fire to be fastened beneath their wings. The birds sought the shelter of their own nests, and filled the city with a blaze; all the townsmen flocked to quench it, and left the gates defenceless. He attacked and captured **Handwan**, but suffered him to redeem his life with gold for ransom. Thus, when he might have cut off his foe, he preferred to grant him the breath of life; so far did his mercy qualify his rage.

The family tree of legendary Kings of the Danes, according to the Gesta Danorum (Books I to VII)

Kings of the Danes are in bold and marked with a crown (♕). Kings of the Swedes are marked with a dagger (†). Superscript numbers before a name indicate in which books of Gesta Danorum the individual is mentioned.

^{(1)} Humble
KEY
^{(1)} Angul | ^{(1)} **Dan** ♕ | ^{(1)} Grytha | Marriage or coupling
Parent and child
The Angles | ^{(1)} **Humble** ♕ | ^{(1)} **Lother** ♕ | ^{(1)} King of the Saxons | Succession by other or unclear means
^{(1)} Roar
^{(1)} Sigtryg, King of the Swedes† | ^{(1)} **Skiold** ♕ | ^{(1)} Alfhild
^{(1)} daughter of Roar | ^{(1)} Bess
^{(1)} sister of Gram | ^{(1)} Gróa | ^{(1)} **Gram** ♕† | ^{(1)} Sumble, King of the Finns
^{(1)} Wagnhofde
^{(1)} Signe | ^{(1)} Henry, King of the Saxons | ^{(1)} Hakon, King of the Nitherians
^{(1)} Hardgrep
^{(1)} **Swipdag** ♕†, King of Norway | ^{(1)} sister of Guthorm | ^{(1)} **Guthorm** ♕ | ^{(1,2,5)} **Hadding** ♕ | ^{(1)} Ragnhild
^{(1)} Asmund† | ^{(1)} Gunnhild | ^{(1)} Guthorm
^{(1,2)} Ulfhild | ^{(2)} **Ubbe** ♕
^{(1)} Henry | ^{(1)} Uffe† | ^{(1,2)} Hunding† | ^{(2)} Thorhild | ^{(2)} Scot
^{(1)} daughter of Uffe | ^{(2)} Ragnar† | ^{(2)} Swanhwid | ^{(2)} sisters of Swanhwid | ^{(2)} Handwan
^{(2)} Thorwald
^{(2,5)} **Frode** ♕ | ^{(2)} daughter of Handwan
^{(2,3)} Hothbrodd† | ^{(2)} **Halfdan** ♕ | ^{(2)} Ro | ^{(2)} Skat
^{(2)} Thora
^{(2,3)} **Helge** ♕ | ^{(2)} **Ro** ♕
^{(2,3)} Athisl† | ^{(2)} Urse
^{(2,3)} King Gewar | ^{(2,3)} **Rolf** Krage ♕† | ^{(2)} Rute | ^{(2)} Bjarke | ^{(2)} Skulde | ^{(2,3)} **Hiartuar** †♕
^{(2,3)} **Hother** †♕ | ^{(3)} Nanna | ^{(3)} Herlek | ^{(3)} Gerit
^{(3)} former King of Britain | ^{(3)} mother of the King of Britain | ^{(3)} a slave | ^{(3)} a bondmaid | ^{(3)} **Rorik** Slyngebond ♕ | ^{(3)} Gerwendil
^{(3,4)} King of Britain | ^{(3,4)} Queen of Britain | ^{(3,4)} Gerutha | ^{(3,4)} Horwendil | ^{(3,4)} Feng
^{(3,4)} foster sister of Amleth | ^{(3,4)} daughter of the King of Britain | ^{(3,4)} Amleth | ^{(4)} Hermutrude, Queen of Scotland | ^{(4)} **Wiglek** ♕
^{(4)} son of Amleth | ^{(4)} **Wermund** ♕ | ^{(4)} Frowin, governor of Sleswik
^{(4)} **Uffe** ♕, aka Olaf the Gentle | ^{(4)} daughter of Frowin | ^{(4)} Ket | ^{(4)} Wig
^{(4)} **Dan** ♕
^{(4)} **Hugleik** ♕
^{(4)} **Frode** the Vigorous ♕
^{(4)} **Dan** ♕
^{(5)} Kraka | ^{(5)} Ragnar | ^{(5)} Brak | ^{(4,5)} **Fridleif** the Swift ♕ | ^{(5)} Hun, King of the Huns | ^{(5)} Hun
^{(5)} Gotar, King of Norway | ^{(5)} Westmar | ^{(5)} Koll | ^{(5)} Gotwar
^{(5)} Roller | ^{(5,6)} Erik† Shrewd-spoken | ^{(5)} Gunwar the Fair | ^{(5)} Alfhild | ^{(5,6)} **Frode** ♕ | ^{(5)} Hanund | ^{(5)} Grep (eldest of three) | ^{(5)} 11 other sons (two named Grep)
^{(6)} Hythin, King of Tellemark | ^{(5)} Alf | ^{(5)} Eyfura | ^{(5)} Arngrim | ^{(6)} Grubb | ^{(6)} **Hiarn** ♕ | ^{(6)} Amund, King of Norway
^{(6)} child of Hythin | ^{(6)} Halfdan† | ^{(5)} 12 sons, including Anganty | ^{(6)} Ane | ^{(6)} Juritha | ^{(6)} **Fridleif** ♕ | ^{(6)} Frogertha
^{(6)} Hanef, King of Saxony | ^{(6)} Swerting, King of Saxony | ^{(6)} Olaf | ^{(6)} **Frode** ♕
^{(6,7)} Siward† | ^{(6)} sons of Swerting | ^{(6)} sister of the sons of Swerting | ^{(6,7)} **Ingild** ♕ | ^{(6)} Helga | ^{(6)} Helge | ^{(6)} Asa
^{(6,7)} Frode | ^{(6,7)} Fridleif | ^{(6,7)} Ingild | ^{(6,7)} **Olaf** ♕ | ^{(7)} Karl, governor of Gothland
^{(7)} Ulfhild | ^{(7)} **Frode** ♕ | ^{(7)} Hather, a chief | ^{(7)} **Harald** ♕ | ^{(7)} Signe
^{(7)} Erik† | ^{(7)} Thorhild | ^{(7)} **Halfdan** Biargramm ♕† | ^{(7)} Harald
^{(7)} Asmund
Kings of Norway

Name spellings are derived from Oliver Elton's 1905 translation, The First Nine Books of the Danish History of Saxo Grammaticus, via Wikisource.
