= Lotherus =

King of the Danes
- Predecessor: Humble
- Successor: Skiod
- Issue: Skiod
- House: Scylding
- Father: Dan I
- Mother: Grytha
- Religion: Pagan

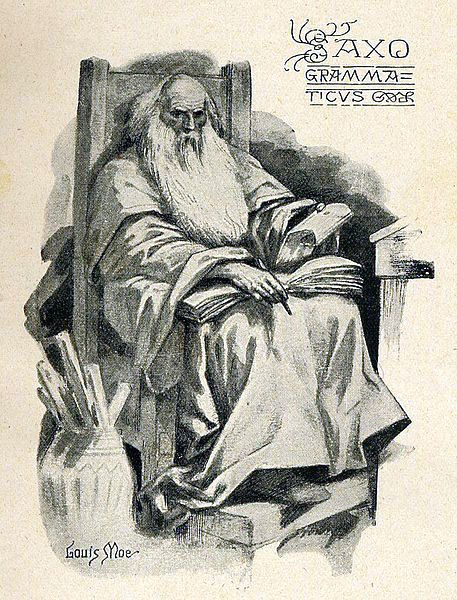
Iconography of the Danish historian Saxo Grammaticus by cartoonist and painter Louis Moe.

Lotherus (Lother) was one of the earliest kings of Denmark according to Saxo Grammaticus's Gesta Danorum.

The name Lotherus may be of the same origin as the Old Norse Hlǫðr of Hervarar saga and Hlöðskviða, or the Old English Hliþe of Widsith.

== Text ==
Gesta Danorum, 1.1–1.2	The Danish History, Book One
Verum a Dan (ut fert antiquitas) regum nostrorum stemmata, ceu quodam derivata principio, splendido successionis ordine profluxerunt. Huic filii Humblus et Lotherus fuere, ex Grytha summae inter Theutones dignitatis matrona suscepti. Lecturi regem veteres affixis humo saxis insistere suffragiaque promere consueverant, subiectorum lapidum firmitate facti constantiam ominaturi. Quo ritu Humblus, decedente patre, novo patriae beneficio rex creatus sequentis fortunae malignitate ex rege privatus evasit. Bello siquidem a Lothero captus regni depositione spiritum mercatus est; haec sola quippe victo salutis condicio reddebatur. Ita fraternis iniuriis imperium abdicare coactus documentum hominibus praebuit, ut plus splendoris, ita minus securitatis aulis quam tuguriis inesse. Ceterum iniuriae tam patiens fuit, ut honoris damno tamquam beneficio gratulari crederetur, sagaciter, ut puto, regiae condicionis habitum contemplatus. Sed nec Lotherus tolerabiliorem regem quam militem egit, ut prorsus insolentia ac scelere regnum auspicari videretur; siquidem illustrissimum quemque vita aut opibus spoliare patriamque bonis civibus vacuefacere probitatis loco duxit, regni aemulos ratus quos nobilitate pares habuerat. Nec diu scelerum impunitus patriae consternatione perimitur, eadem spiritum eripiente, quae regnum largita fuerat.	From Dan, however, so saith antiquity; the pedigrees of our kings have flowed in glorious series, like channels from some parent spring. Grytha, a matron most highly revered among the Teutons, bore him two sons, HUMBLE and LOTHER. The ancients, when they were to choose a king, were wont to stand on stones planted in the ground, and to proclaim their votes, in order to foreshadow from the steadfastness of the stones that the deed would be lasting. By this ceremony Humble was elected king at his father's death, thus winning a novel favour from his country; but by the malice of ensuing fate he fell from a king into a common man. For he was taken by Lother in war, and bought his life by yielding up his crown; such, in truth, were the only terms of escape offered him in his defeat. Forced, therefore, by the injustice of a brother to lay down his sovereignty, he furnished the lesson to mankind, that there is less safety, though more pomp, in the palace than in the cottage. Also, he bore his wrong so meekly that he seemed to rejoice at his loss of title as though it were a blessing; and I think he had a shrewd sense of the quality of a king's estate. But Lother played the king as insupportably as he had played the soldier, inaugurating his reign straightway with arrogance and crime; for he counted it uprightness to strip all the most eminent of life or goods, and to clear his country of its loyal citizens, thinking all his equals in birth his rivals for the crown. He was soon chastised for his wickedness; for he met his end in an insurrection of his country; which had once bestowed on him his kingdom, and now bereft him of his life.

The family tree of legendary Kings of the Danes, according to the Gesta Danorum (Books I to VII)

Kings of the Danes are in bold and marked with a crown (♕). Kings of the Swedes are marked with a dagger (†). Superscript numbers before a name indicate in which books of Gesta Danorum the individual is mentioned.

^{(1)} Humble
KEY
^{(1)} Angul	^{(1)} **Dan** ♕	^{(1)} Grytha	Marriage or coupling
Parent and child
The Angles	^{(1)} **Humble** ♕	^{(1)} **Lother** ♕	^{(1)} King of the Saxons	Succession by other or unclear means
^{(1)} Roar
^{(1)} Sigtryg, King of the Swedes†	^{(1)} **Skiold** ♕	^{(1)} Alfhild
^{(1)} daughter of Roar	^{(1)} Bess
^{(1)} sister of Gram	^{(1)} Gróa	^{(1)} **Gram** ♕†	^{(1)} Sumble, King of the Finns
^{(1)} Wagnhofde
^{(1)} Signe	^{(1)} Henry, King of the Saxons	^{(1)} Hakon, King of the Nitherians
^{(1)} Hardgrep
^{(1)} **Swipdag** ♕†, King of Norway	^{(1)} sister of Guthorm	^{(1)} **Guthorm** ♕	^{(1,2,5)} **Hadding** ♕	^{(1)} Ragnhild
^{(1)} Asmund†	^{(1)} Gunnhild	^{(1)} Guthorm
^{(1,2)} Ulfhild	^{(2)} **Ubbe** ♕
^{(1)} Henry	^{(1)} Uffe†	^{(1,2)} Hunding†	^{(2)} Thorhild	^{(2)} Scot
^{(1)} daughter of Uffe	^{(2)} Ragnar†	^{(2)} Swanhwid	^{(2)} sisters of Swanhwid	^{(2)} Handwan
^{(2)} Thorwald
^{(2,5)} **Frode** ♕	^{(2)} daughter of Handwan
^{(2,3)} Hothbrodd†	^{(2)} **Halfdan** ♕	^{(2)} Ro	^{(2)} Skat
^{(2)} Thora
^{(2,3)} **Helge** ♕	^{(2)} **Ro** ♕
^{(2,3)} Athisl†	^{(2)} Urse
^{(2,3)} King Gewar	^{(2,3)} **Rolf** Krage ♕†	^{(2)} Rute	^{(2)} Bjarke	^{(2)} Skulde	^{(2,3)} **Hiartuar** †♕
^{(2,3)} **Hother** †♕	^{(3)} Nanna	^{(3)} Herlek	^{(3)} Gerit
^{(3)} former King of Britain	^{(3)} mother of the King of Britain	^{(3)} a slave	^{(3)} a bondmaid	^{(3)} **Rorik** Slyngebond ♕	^{(3)} Gerwendil
^{(3,4)} King of Britain	^{(3,4)} Queen of Britain	^{(3,4)} Gerutha	^{(3,4)} Horwendil	^{(3,4)} Feng
^{(3,4)} foster sister of Amleth	^{(3,4)} daughter of the King of Britain	^{(3,4)} Amleth	^{(4)} Hermutrude, Queen of Scotland	^{(4)} **Wiglek** ♕
^{(4)} son of Amleth	^{(4)} **Wermund** ♕	^{(4)} Frowin, governor of Sleswik
^{(4)} **Uffe** ♕, aka Olaf the Gentle	^{(4)} daughter of Frowin	^{(4)} Ket	^{(4)} Wig
^{(4)} **Dan** ♕
^{(4)} **Hugleik** ♕
^{(4)} **Frode** the Vigorous ♕
^{(4)} **Dan** ♕
^{(5)} Kraka	^{(5)} Ragnar	^{(5)} Brak	^{(4,5)} **Fridleif** the Swift ♕	^{(5)} Hun, King of the Huns	^{(5)} Hun
^{(5)} Gotar, King of Norway	^{(5)} Westmar	^{(5)} Koll	^{(5)} Gotwar
^{(5)} Roller	^{(5,6)} Erik† Shrewd-spoken	^{(5)} Gunwar the Fair	^{(5)} Alfhild	^{(5,6)} **Frode** ♕	^{(5)} Hanund	^{(5)} Grep (eldest of three)	^{(5)} 11 other sons (two named Grep)
^{(6)} Hythin, King of Tellemark	^{(5)} Alf	^{(5)} Eyfura	^{(5)} Arngrim	^{(6)} Grubb	^{(6)} **Hiarn** ♕	^{(6)} Amund, King of Norway
^{(6)} child of Hythin	^{(6)} Halfdan†	^{(5)} 12 sons, including Anganty	^{(6)} Ane	^{(6)} Juritha	^{(6)} **Fridleif** ♕	^{(6)} Frogertha
^{(6)} Hanef, King of Saxony	^{(6)} Swerting, King of Saxony	^{(6)} Olaf	^{(6)} **Frode** ♕
^{(6,7)} Siward†	^{(6)} sons of Swerting	^{(6)} sister of the sons of Swerting	^{(6,7)} **Ingild** ♕	^{(6)} Helga	^{(6)} Helge	^{(6)} Asa
^{(6,7)} Frode	^{(6,7)} Fridleif	^{(6,7)} Ingild	^{(6,7)} **Olaf** ♕	^{(7)} Karl, governor of Gothland
^{(7)} Ulfhild	^{(7)} **Frode** ♕	^{(7)} Hather, a chief	^{(7)} **Harald** ♕	^{(7)} Signe
^{(7)} Erik†	^{(7)} Thorhild	^{(7)} **Halfdan** Biargramm ♕†	^{(7)} Harald
^{(7)} Asmund
Kings of Norway

Name spellings are derived from Oliver Elton's 1905 translation, The First Nine Books of the Danish History of Saxo Grammaticus, via Wikisource.

== See also ==
- Heremod

== Notes ==
Legendary titles
Preceded by Humblus	King of the Danes	Succeeded by Skioldus
