= Dan II of Denmark =

Dan II is one of the legendary Danish kings, the son of Offa of Angel, described in Saxo Grammaticus' Gesta Danorum.

== Text ==
Gesta Danorum, 4.6	The Danish History, Book Four
Uffoni Dan filius succedit. Qui cum, transfusis in exteros proeliis, trophaeorum frequentia rerum dominium propagasset, partum gloriae fulgorem taetro superbiae squalore fuscavit, ita a clarissimi parentis honestate degenerans, ut, cum ille ceteris moderatione praestiterit, hic ceteros fastuosa tumidus elatione contempserit. Sed et paterna bona, vel quae ipse exterarum gentium manubiis pepererat, flagitiis disiciebat, opes, quae regio splendori servire debuerant, voracibus sumptuum impensis tribuens. Sic interdum a maioribus suis similia portentis pignora desciscunt.	Uffe was succeeded by his son DAN, who carried his arms against foreigners, and increased his sovereignty with many a trophy; but he tarnished the brightness of the glory he had won by foul and abominable presumption; falling so far away from the honour of his famous father, who surpassed all others in modesty, that he contrariwise was puffed up and proudly exalted in spirit, so that he scorned all other men. He also squandered the goods of his father on infamies, as well as his own winnings from the spoils of foreign nations; and he devoured in expenditure on luxuries the wealth which should have ministered to his royal estate. Thus do sons sometimes, like monstrous births, degenerate from their ancestors.

The family tree of legendary Kings of the Danes, according to the Gesta Danorum (Books I to VII)

Kings of the Danes are in bold and marked with an asterisk (*). Kings of the Swedes are marked with a dagger (†). Superscript numbers before a name indicate in which books of Gesta Danorum the individual is mentioned.

^{(1)} Humble
KEY
^{(1)} Angul	^{(1)} **Dan***	^{(1)} Grytha	Marriage or coupling
Parent and child
The Angles	^{(1)} **Humble***	^{(1)} **Lother***	^{(1)} King of the Saxons	Succession by other or unclear means
^{(1)} Roar
^{(1)} Sigtryg, King of the Swedes†	^{(1)} **Skiold***	^{(1)} Alfhild
^{(1)} daughter of Roar	^{(1)} Bess
^{(1)} sister of Gram	^{(1)} Gróa	^{(1)} **Gram***†	^{(1)} Sumble, King of the Finns
^{(1)} Wagnhofde
^{(1)} Signe	^{(1)} Henry, King of the Saxons	^{(1)} Hakon, King of the Nitherians
^{(1)} Hardgrep
^{(1)} **Swipdag***†, King of Norway	^{(1)} sister of Guthorm	^{(1)} **Guthorm***	^{(1,2,5)} **Hadding***	^{(1)} Ragnhild
^{(1)} Asmund†	^{(1)} Gunnhild	^{(1)} Guthorm
^{(1,2)} Ulfhild	^{(2)} **Ubbe***
^{(1)} Henry	^{(1)} Uffe†	^{(1,2)} Hunding†	^{(2)} Thorhild	^{(2)} Scot
^{(1)} daughter of Uffe	^{(2)} Ragnar†	^{(2)} Swanhwid	^{(2)} sisters of Swanhwid	^{(2)} Handwan
^{(2)} Thorwald
^{(2,5)} **Frode***	^{(2)} daughter of Handwan
^{(2,3)} Hothbrodd†	^{(2)} **Halfdan***	^{(2)} Ro	^{(2)} Skat
^{(2)} Thora
^{(2,3)} **Helge***	^{(2)} **Ro***
^{(2,3)} Athisl†	^{(2)} Urse
^{(2,3)} King Gewar	^{(2,3)} **Rolf***† Krage	^{(2)} Rute	^{(2)} Bjarke	^{(2)} Skulde	^{(2,3)} **Hiartuar**†*
^{(2,3)} **Hother**†*	^{(3)} Nanna	^{(3)} Herlek	^{(3)} Gerit
^{(3)} former King of Britain	^{(3)} mother of the King of Britain	^{(3)} a slave	^{(3)} a bondmaid	^{(3)} **Rorik***	^{(3)} Gerwendil
^{(3,4)} King of Britain	^{(3,4)} Queen of Britain	^{(3,4)} Gerutha	^{(3,4)} Horwendil	^{(3,4)} Feng
^{(3,4)} foster sister of Amleth	^{(3,4)} daughter of the King of Britain	^{(3,4)} Amleth	^{(4)} Hermutrude, Queen of Scotland	^{(4)} **Wiglek***
^{(4)} son of Amleth	^{(4)} **Wermund***	^{(4)} Frowin, governor of Sleswik
^{(4)} **Uffe***, aka Olaf the Gentle	^{(4)} daughter of Frowin	^{(4)} Ket	^{(4)} Wig
^{(4)} **Dan***
^{(4)} **Hugleik***
^{(4)} **Frode*** the Vigorous
^{(4)} **Dan***
^{(5)} Kraka	^{(5)} Ragnar	^{(5)} Brak	^{(4,5)} **Fridleif*** the Swift	^{(5)} Hun, King of the Huns	^{(5)} Hun
^{(5)} Gotar, King of Norway	^{(5)} Westmar	^{(5)} Koll	^{(5)} Gotwar
^{(5)} Roller	^{(5,6)} Erik† Shrewd-spoken	^{(5)} Gunwar the Fair	^{(5)} Alfhild	^{(5,6)} **Frode***	^{(5)} Hanund	^{(5)} Grep (eldest of three)	^{(5)} 11 other sons (two named Grep)
^{(6)} Hythin, King of Tellemark	^{(5)} Alf	^{(5)} Eyfura	^{(5)} Arngrim	^{(6)} Grubb	^{(6)} **Hiarn***	^{(6)} Amund, King of Norway
^{(6)} child of Hythin	^{(6)} Halfdan†	^{(5)} 12 sons, including Anganty	^{(6)} Ane	^{(6)} Juritha	^{(6)} **Fridleif***	^{(6)} Frogertha
^{(6)} Hanef, King of Saxony	^{(6)} Swerting, King of Saxony	^{(6)} Olaf	^{(6)} **Frode***
^{(6,7)} Siward†	^{(6)} sons of Swerting	^{(6)} sister of the sons of Swerting	^{(6,7)} **Ingild***	^{(6)} Helga	^{(6)} Helge	^{(6)} Asa
^{(6,7)} Frode	^{(6,7)} Fridleif	^{(6,7)} Ingild	^{(6,7)} **Olaf***	^{(7)} Karl, governor of Gothland
^{(7)} Ulfhild	^{(7)} **Frode***	^{(7)} Hather, a chief	^{(7)} **Harald***	^{(7)} Signe
^{(7)} Erik†	^{(7)} Thorhild	^{(7)} **Halfdan***† Biargramm	^{(7)} Harald
^{(7)} Asmund
Kings of Norway

Name spellings are derived from Oliver Elton's 1905 translation, The First Nine Books of the Danish History of Saxo Grammaticus, via Wikisource.

== See also ==
- Dan (king)

== Notes ==
Legendary titles
Preceded by Uffo	King of Denmark	Succeeded by Huglecus
