= Dan III =

Danish king

Dan III is one of the legendary Danish kings described in Saxo Grammaticus' Gesta Danorum.

== Text ==
**Gesta Danorum**, 4.9

Post hunc Dan regnum capessit. Qui cum duodecimum aetatis annum ageret, legationum petulantia fatigatur, Saxonibus bellum aut tributum afferre iussus. Sed rubor pugnam pensioni anteposuit, potius ad strenue moriendum quam timide vivendum impellens. Itaque praelata pugnandi sorte, Danorum iuventus Albyam fluvium tanta navigiorum frequentia complevit, ut facilem eius transitum perinde ac continuo ponte iuncta puppium tabulata praestarent. Quo evenit, ut Saxoniae rex eidem quam a Danis exigebat condicioni adigeretur.

**The Danish History**, Book Four

After him DAN came to the throne. When he was in the twelfth year of his age, he was wearied by the insolence of the embassies, which commanded him either to fight the Saxons or to pay them tribute. Ashamed, he preferred fighting to payment and was moved to die stoutly rather than live a coward. So he elected to fight; and the warriors of the Danes filled the Elbe with such a throng of vessels, that the decks of the ships lashed together made it quite easy to cross, as though along a continuous bridge. The end was that the King of Saxony had to accept the very terms he was demanding from the Danes.

The family tree of legendary Kings of the Danes, according to the Gesta Danorum (Books I to VII)

Kings of the Danes are in bold and marked with an asterisk (*). Kings of the Swedes are marked with a dagger (†). Superscript numbers before a name indicate in which books of Gesta Danorum the individual is mentioned.

^{(1)} Humble
KEY
^{(1)} Angul | ^{(1)} **Dan*** | ^{(1)} Grytha | Marriage or coupling
Parent and child
The Angles | ^{(1)} **Humble*** | ^{(1)} **Lother*** | ^{(1)} King of the Saxons | Succession by other or unclear means
^{(1)} Roar
^{(1)} Sigtryg, King of the Swedes† | ^{(1)} **Skiold*** | ^{(1)} Alfhild
^{(1)} daughter of Roar | ^{(1)} Bess
^{(1)} sister of Gram | ^{(1)} Gróa | ^{(1)} **Gram***† | ^{(1)} Sumble, King of the Finns
^{(1)} Wagnhofde
^{(1)} Signe | ^{(1)} Henry, King of the Saxons | ^{(1)} Hakon, King of the Nitherians
^{(1)} Hardgrep
^{(1)} **Swipdag***†, King of Norway | ^{(1)} sister of Guthorm | ^{(1)} **Guthorm*** | ^{(1,2,5)} **Hadding*** | ^{(1)} Ragnhild
^{(1)} Asmund† | ^{(1)} Gunnhild | ^{(1)} Guthorm
^{(1,2)} Ulfhild | ^{(2)} **Ubbe***
^{(1)} Henry | ^{(1)} Uffe† | ^{(1,2)} Hunding† | ^{(2)} Thorhild | ^{(2)} Scot
^{(1)} daughter of Uffe | ^{(2)} Ragnar† | ^{(2)} Swanhwid | ^{(2)} sisters of Swanhwid | ^{(2)} Handwan
^{(2)} Thorwald
^{(2,5)} **Frode*** | ^{(2)} daughter of Handwan
^{(2,3)} Hothbrodd† | ^{(2)} **Halfdan*** | ^{(2)} Ro | ^{(2)} Skat
^{(2)} Thora
^{(2,3)} **Helge*** | ^{(2)} **Ro***
^{(2,3)} Athisl† | ^{(2)} Urse
^{(2,3)} King Gewar | ^{(2,3)} **Rolf***† Krage | ^{(2)} Rute | ^{(2)} Bjarke | ^{(2)} Skulde | ^{(2,3)} **Hiartuar**†*
^{(2,3)} **Hother**†* | ^{(3)} Nanna | ^{(3)} Herlek | ^{(3)} Gerit
^{(3)} former King of Britain | ^{(3)} mother of the King of Britain | ^{(3)} a slave | ^{(3)} a bondmaid | ^{(3)} **Rorik*** | ^{(3)} Gerwendil
^{(3,4)} King of Britain | ^{(3,4)} Queen of Britain | ^{(3,4)} Gerutha | ^{(3,4)} Horwendil | ^{(3,4)} Feng
^{(3,4)} foster sister of Amleth | ^{(3,4)} daughter of the King of Britain | ^{(3,4)} Amleth | ^{(4)} Hermutrude, Queen of Scotland | ^{(4)} **Wiglek***
^{(4)} son of Amleth | ^{(4)} **Wermund*** | ^{(4)} Frowin, governor of Sleswik
^{(4)} **Uffe***, aka Olaf the Gentle | ^{(4)} daughter of Frowin | ^{(4)} Ket | ^{(4)} Wig
^{(4)} **Dan***
^{(4)} **Hugleik***
^{(4)} **Frode*** the Vigorous
^{(4)} **Dan***
^{(5)} Kraka | ^{(5)} Ragnar | ^{(5)} Brak | ^{(4,5)} **Fridleif*** the Swift | ^{(5)} Hun, King of the Huns | ^{(5)} Hun
^{(5)} Gotar, King of Norway | ^{(5)} Westmar | ^{(5)} Koll | ^{(5)} Gotwar
^{(5)} Roller | ^{(5,6)} Erik† Shrewd-spoken | ^{(5)} Gunwar the Fair | ^{(5)} Alfhild | ^{(5,6)} **Frode*** | ^{(5)} Hanund | ^{(5)} Grep (eldest of three) | ^{(5)} 11 other sons (two named Grep)
^{(6)} Hythin, King of Tellemark | ^{(5)} Alf | ^{(5)} Eyfura | ^{(5)} Arngrim | ^{(6)} Grubb | ^{(6)} **Hiarn*** | ^{(6)} Amund, King of Norway
^{(6)} child of Hythin | ^{(6)} Halfdan† | ^{(5)} 12 sons, including Anganty | ^{(6)} Ane | ^{(6)} Juritha | ^{(6)} **Fridleif*** | ^{(6)} Frogertha
^{(6)} Hanef, King of Saxony | ^{(6)} Swerting, King of Saxony | ^{(6)} Olaf | ^{(6)} **Frode***
^{(6,7)} Siward† | ^{(6)} sons of Swerting | ^{(6)} sister of the sons of Swerting | ^{(6,7)} **Ingild*** | ^{(6)} Helga | ^{(6)} Helge | ^{(6)} Asa
^{(6,7)} Frode | ^{(6,7)} Fridleif | ^{(6,7)} Ingild | ^{(6,7)} **Olaf*** | ^{(7)} Karl, governor of Gothland
^{(7)} Ulfhild | ^{(7)} **Frode*** | ^{(7)} Hather, a chief | ^{(7)} **Harald*** | ^{(7)} Signe
^{(7)} Erik† | ^{(7)} Thorhild | ^{(7)} **Halfdan***† Biargramm | ^{(7)} Harald
^{(7)} Asmund
Kings of Norway

Name spellings are derived from Oliver Elton's 1905 translation, The First Nine Books of the Danish History of Saxo Grammaticus, via Wikisource.

== See also ==
- Dan (king)

== Notes ==
Legendary titles
| Preceded by Frotho II | King of Denmark | Succeeded by Fridlevus I |
