= Guthorm =

Legendary king of the Danes

King of the Danes
- Predecessor: Svipdagr
- Successor: Svipdagr
- House: Scylding
- Father: Gram
- Mother: Groa
- Religion: Pagan

Guthorm or Guthormus was one of the earliest legendary Danish kings according to Saxo Grammaticus. He was a son of the Danish king, Gram, and a Swedish princess, Groa.

== History ==
His father was slain by the Norwegian king, Svipdagr. After the incident, Svipdagr installed him as the puppet king of the Danes. However, his half-brother, Hading refused the offer and entered exile, later he returned and retook his father's kingdom, but lack of mentions of Guthorm implies that his half-brother died before his return. (It is also stated that when Hading defeated Svipdag, he had vengeance not only for his father but also his brother, supporting the idea that Guthorm had already died.)

== Text ==
Gesta Danorum, Book One
**GUTHORM** and HADDING, the son of Gram (Groa being the mother of the first and Signe of the second), were sent over to Sweden in a ship by their foster-father, Brage (Swipdag being now master of Denmark), and put in charge of the giants Wagnhofde and Hafle, for guard as well as rearing.
Swipdag, now that he had slain Gram, was enriched with the realms of Denmark and Sweden; and because of the frequent importunities of his wife he brought back from banishment her brother **Guthorm**, upon his promising tribute, and made him ruler of the Danes. But Hadding preferred to avenge his father rather than take a boon from his foe.

The family tree of legendary Kings of the Danes, according to the Gesta Danorum (Books I to VII)

Kings of the Danes are in bold and marked with a crown (♕). Kings of the Swedes are marked with a dagger (†). Superscript numbers before a name indicate in which books of Gesta Danorum the individual is mentioned.

^{(1)} Humble
KEY
^{(1)} Angul	^{(1)} **Dan** ♕	^{(1)} Grytha	Marriage or coupling
Parent and child
The Angles	^{(1)} **Humble** ♕	^{(1)} **Lother** ♕	^{(1)} King of the Saxons	Succession by other or unclear means
^{(1)} Roar
^{(1)} Sigtryg, King of the Swedes†	^{(1)} **Skiold** ♕	^{(1)} Alfhild
^{(1)} daughter of Roar	^{(1)} Bess
^{(1)} sister of Gram	^{(1)} Gróa	^{(1)} **Gram** ♕†	^{(1)} Sumble, King of the Finns
^{(1)} Wagnhofde
^{(1)} Signe	^{(1)} Henry, King of the Saxons	^{(1)} Hakon, King of the Nitherians
^{(1)} Hardgrep
^{(1)} **Swipdag** ♕†, King of Norway	^{(1)} sister of Guthorm	^{(1)} **Guthorm** ♕	^{(1,2,5)} **Hadding** ♕	^{(1)} Ragnhild
^{(1)} Asmund†	^{(1)} Gunnhild	^{(1)} Guthorm
^{(1,2)} Ulfhild	^{(2)} **Ubbe** ♕
^{(1)} Henry	^{(1)} Uffe†	^{(1,2)} Hunding†	^{(2)} Thorhild	^{(2)} Scot
^{(1)} daughter of Uffe	^{(2)} Ragnar†	^{(2)} Swanhwid	^{(2)} sisters of Swanhwid	^{(2)} Handwan
^{(2)} Thorwald
^{(2,5)} **Frode** ♕	^{(2)} daughter of Handwan
^{(2,3)} Hothbrodd†	^{(2)} **Halfdan** ♕	^{(2)} Ro	^{(2)} Skat
^{(2)} Thora
^{(2,3)} **Helge** ♕	^{(2)} **Ro** ♕
^{(2,3)} Athisl†	^{(2)} Urse
^{(2,3)} King Gewar	^{(2,3)} **Rolf** Krage ♕†	^{(2)} Rute	^{(2)} Bjarke	^{(2)} Skulde	^{(2,3)} **Hiartuar** †♕
^{(2,3)} **Hother** †♕	^{(3)} Nanna	^{(3)} Herlek	^{(3)} Gerit
^{(3)} former King of Britain	^{(3)} mother of the King of Britain	^{(3)} a slave	^{(3)} a bondmaid	^{(3)} **Rorik** Slyngebond ♕	^{(3)} Gerwendil
^{(3,4)} King of Britain	^{(3,4)} Queen of Britain	^{(3,4)} Gerutha	^{(3,4)} Horwendil	^{(3,4)} Feng
^{(3,4)} foster sister of Amleth	^{(3,4)} daughter of the King of Britain	^{(3,4)} Amleth	^{(4)} Hermutrude, Queen of Scotland	^{(4)} **Wiglek** ♕
^{(4)} son of Amleth	^{(4)} **Wermund** ♕	^{(4)} Frowin, governor of Sleswik
^{(4)} **Uffe** ♕, aka Olaf the Gentle	^{(4)} daughter of Frowin	^{(4)} Ket	^{(4)} Wig
^{(4)} **Dan** ♕
^{(4)} **Hugleik** ♕
^{(4)} **Frode** the Vigorous ♕
^{(4)} **Dan** ♕
^{(5)} Kraka	^{(5)} Ragnar	^{(5)} Brak	^{(4,5)} **Fridleif** the Swift ♕	^{(5)} Hun, King of the Huns	^{(5)} Hun
^{(5)} Gotar, King of Norway	^{(5)} Westmar	^{(5)} Koll	^{(5)} Gotwar
^{(5)} Roller	^{(5,6)} Erik† Shrewd-spoken	^{(5)} Gunwar the Fair	^{(5)} Alfhild	^{(5,6)} **Frode** ♕	^{(5)} Hanund	^{(5)} Grep (eldest of three)	^{(5)} 11 other sons (two named Grep)
^{(6)} Hythin, King of Tellemark	^{(5)} Alf	^{(5)} Eyfura	^{(5)} Arngrim	^{(6)} Grubb	^{(6)} **Hiarn** ♕	^{(6)} Amund, King of Norway
^{(6)} child of Hythin	^{(6)} Halfdan†	^{(5)} 12 sons, including Anganty	^{(6)} Ane	^{(6)} Juritha	^{(6)} **Fridleif** ♕	^{(6)} Frogertha
^{(6)} Hanef, King of Saxony	^{(6)} Swerting, King of Saxony	^{(6)} Olaf	^{(6)} **Frode** ♕
^{(6,7)} Siward†	^{(6)} sons of Swerting	^{(6)} sister of the sons of Swerting	^{(6,7)} **Ingild** ♕	^{(6)} Helga	^{(6)} Helge	^{(6)} Asa
^{(6,7)} Frode	^{(6,7)} Fridleif	^{(6,7)} Ingild	^{(6,7)} **Olaf** ♕	^{(7)} Karl, governor of Gothland
^{(7)} Ulfhild	^{(7)} **Frode** ♕	^{(7)} Hather, a chief	^{(7)} **Harald** ♕	^{(7)} Signe
^{(7)} Erik†	^{(7)} Thorhild	^{(7)} **Halfdan** Biargramm ♕†	^{(7)} Harald
^{(7)} Asmund
Kings of Norway

Name spellings are derived from Oliver Elton's 1905 translation, The First Nine Books of the Danish History of Saxo Grammaticus, via Wikisource.

Legendary titles
Preceded by Svipdagr	King of the Danes	Succeeded by Svipdagr
