= Frotho II =

Legendary king of Denmark

Frotho II is one of the legendary Danish kings described in Saxo Grammaticus' Gesta Danorum.

== Text ==
| Gesta Danorum, 4.8 | The Danish History, Book Four |
|---|---|
| Cui Frotho succedit cognomento Vegetus, qui ipsam cognominis speciem corporis animique firmitate testatus, denis Norvagiae ducibus bello consumptis, insulam, quae ex eo postmodum nomen obtinuit, ipsum postremo regem invasurus accessit. Frogerus hic erat gemina admodum sorte conspicuus, quod non minus armis quam opibus illustris regiam ditionem athletico decoraret officio tantumque gymnicis palmis quantum dignitatis ornamentis polleret. Hic, ut quidam ferunt, Othino patre natus a diis immortalibus beneficium praestare rogatis muneris loco obtinuit non ab alio vinci quam, qui certaminis tempore subiectum pedibus eius pulverem manu convellere potuisset. Quem Frotho tanta a superis firmitate donatum comperiens duelli postulatione sollicitat, deorum indulgentiam fallacia tentaturus. Primum igitur imperitiae simulatione dimicationis ab ipso documentum efflagitat, cuius eum usu experientiaque callere sciat. Ille hostem professioni suae non solum cedere, sed etiam supplicare gavisus, sapere eum asseruit, senili industriae iuvenilem animum subiciendo, quod ei facies cicatricibus vacua fronsque nullis armorum vestigiis exarata tenuem huius rei notitiam exstare testetur. Ita e diverso bina quadratae formae spatia cubitalibus figurata lateribus humi denotat, a locorum usu documenti initium editurus. Quibus descriptis, assignatam uterque sibi partem complectitur. Tum Frogerum Frotho arma secum ac locum permutare iubet. Nec difficilis admissio fuit: Frogerum siquidem hostilium nitor concitabat armorum, quod Frotho praeditum auro capulum loricamque pari specie radiantem, sed et cassidem in eundem modum eximio comptam fulgore gestaret. Igitur Frotho, loco, quo Frogerus excesserat, pulvere correpto, omen sibi victoriae datum existimavit. Nec augurio elusus continuo Frogerum occidit, tam parvulo vaframento maximam fortitudinis gloriam assecutus. Quippe, quod nullius ante viribus licuit, astutia praestitit. | To him succeeded FRODE, surnamed the Vigorous, who bore out his name by the strength of his body and mind. He destroyed in war ten captains of Norway, and finally approached the island which afterwards had its name from him, meaning to attack the king himself last of all. This king, Froger, was in two ways very distinguished, being notable in arms no less than in wealth; and graced his sovereignty with the deeds of a champion, being as rich in prizes for bodily feats as in the honours of rank. According to some, he was the son of Odin, and when he begged the immortal gods to grant him a boon, received the privilege that no man should conquer him, save he who at the time of the conflict could catch up in his hand the dust lying beneath Froger's feet. When Frode found that Heaven had endowed this king with such might, he challenged him to a duel, meaning to try to outwit the favour of the gods. So at first, feigning inexperience, he besought the king for a lesson in fighting, knowing (he said) his skill and experience in the same. The other, rejoicing that his enemy not only yielded to his pretensions, but even made him a request, said that he was wise to submit his youthful mind to an old man's wisdom; for his unscarred face and his brow, ploughed by no marks of battle, showed that his knowledge of such matters was but slender. So he marked off on the ground two square spaces with sides an ell long, opposite one another, meaning to begin by instructing him about the use of these plots. When they had been marked off, each took the side assigned to him. Then Frode asked Froger to exchange arms and ground with him, and the request was readily granted. For Froger was excited with the dashing of his enemy's arms, because Frode wore a gold-hilted sword, a breastplate equally bright, and a headpiece most brilliantly adorned in the same manner. So Frode caught up some dust from the ground whence Froger had gone, and thought that he had been granted an omen of victory. Nor was he deceived in his presage; for he straightway slew Froger, and by this petty trick won the greatest name for bravery; for he gained by craft what had been permitted to no man's strength before. |

The family tree of legendary Kings of the Danes, according to the Gesta Danorum (Books I to VII)

Kings of the Danes are in bold and marked with a crown (♕). Kings of the Swedes are marked with a dagger (†). Superscript numbers before a name indicate in which books of Gesta Danorum the individual is mentioned.

^{(1)} Humble
KEY
^{(1)} Angul | ^{(1)} **Dan** ♕ | ^{(1)} Grytha | Marriage or coupling
Parent and child
The Angles | ^{(1)} **Humble** ♕ | ^{(1)} **Lother** ♕ | ^{(1)} King of the Saxons | Succession by other or unclear means
^{(1)} Roar
^{(1)} Sigtryg, King of the Swedes† | ^{(1)} **Skiold** ♕ | ^{(1)} Alfhild
^{(1)} daughter of Roar | ^{(1)} Bess
^{(1)} sister of Gram | ^{(1)} Gróa | ^{(1)} **Gram** ♕† | ^{(1)} Sumble, King of the Finns
^{(1)} Wagnhofde
^{(1)} Signe | ^{(1)} Henry, King of the Saxons | ^{(1)} Hakon, King of the Nitherians
^{(1)} Hardgrep
^{(1)} **Swipdag** ♕†, King of Norway | ^{(1)} sister of Guthorm | ^{(1)} **Guthorm** ♕ | ^{(1,2,5)} **Hadding** ♕ | ^{(1)} Ragnhild
^{(1)} Asmund† | ^{(1)} Gunnhild | ^{(1)} Guthorm
^{(1,2)} Ulfhild | ^{(2)} **Ubbe** ♕
^{(1)} Henry | ^{(1)} Uffe† | ^{(1,2)} Hunding† | ^{(2)} Thorhild | ^{(2)} Scot
^{(1)} daughter of Uffe | ^{(2)} Ragnar† | ^{(2)} Swanhwid | ^{(2)} sisters of Swanhwid | ^{(2)} Handwan
^{(2)} Thorwald
^{(2,5)} **Frode** ♕ | ^{(2)} daughter of Handwan
^{(2,3)} Hothbrodd† | ^{(2)} **Halfdan** ♕ | ^{(2)} Ro | ^{(2)} Skat
^{(2)} Thora
^{(2,3)} **Helge** ♕ | ^{(2)} **Ro** ♕
^{(2,3)} Athisl† | ^{(2)} Urse
^{(2,3)} King Gewar | ^{(2,3)} **Rolf** Krage ♕† | ^{(2)} Rute | ^{(2)} Bjarke | ^{(2)} Skulde | ^{(2,3)} **Hiartuar** †♕
^{(2,3)} **Hother** †♕ | ^{(3)} Nanna | ^{(3)} Herlek | ^{(3)} Gerit
^{(3)} former King of Britain | ^{(3)} mother of the King of Britain | ^{(3)} a slave | ^{(3)} a bondmaid | ^{(3)} **Rorik** Slyngebond ♕ | ^{(3)} Gerwendil
^{(3,4)} King of Britain | ^{(3,4)} Queen of Britain | ^{(3,4)} Gerutha | ^{(3,4)} Horwendil | ^{(3,4)} Feng
^{(3,4)} foster sister of Amleth | ^{(3,4)} daughter of the King of Britain | ^{(3,4)} Amleth | ^{(4)} Hermutrude, Queen of Scotland | ^{(4)} **Wiglek** ♕
^{(4)} son of Amleth | ^{(4)} **Wermund** ♕ | ^{(4)} Frowin, governor of Sleswik
^{(4)} **Uffe** ♕, aka Olaf the Gentle | ^{(4)} daughter of Frowin | ^{(4)} Ket | ^{(4)} Wig
^{(4)} **Dan** ♕
^{(4)} **Hugleik** ♕
^{(4)} **Frode** the Vigorous ♕
^{(4)} **Dan** ♕
^{(5)} Kraka | ^{(5)} Ragnar | ^{(5)} Brak | ^{(4,5)} **Fridleif** the Swift ♕ | ^{(5)} Hun, King of the Huns | ^{(5)} Hun
^{(5)} Gotar, King of Norway | ^{(5)} Westmar | ^{(5)} Koll | ^{(5)} Gotwar
^{(5)} Roller | ^{(5,6)} Erik† Shrewd-spoken | ^{(5)} Gunwar the Fair | ^{(5)} Alfhild | ^{(5,6)} **Frode** ♕ | ^{(5)} Hanund | ^{(5)} Grep (eldest of three) | ^{(5)} 11 other sons (two named Grep)
^{(6)} Hythin, King of Tellemark | ^{(5)} Alf | ^{(5)} Eyfura | ^{(5)} Arngrim | ^{(6)} Grubb | ^{(6)} **Hiarn** ♕ | ^{(6)} Amund, King of Norway
^{(6)} child of Hythin | ^{(6)} Halfdan† | ^{(5)} 12 sons, including Anganty | ^{(6)} Ane | ^{(6)} Juritha | ^{(6)} **Fridleif** ♕ | ^{(6)} Frogertha
^{(6)} Hanef, King of Saxony | ^{(6)} Swerting, King of Saxony | ^{(6)} Olaf | ^{(6)} **Frode** ♕
^{(6,7)} Siward† | ^{(6)} sons of Swerting | ^{(6)} sister of the sons of Swerting | ^{(6,7)} **Ingild** ♕ | ^{(6)} Helga | ^{(6)} Helge | ^{(6)} Asa
^{(6,7)} Frode | ^{(6,7)} Fridleif | ^{(6,7)} Ingild | ^{(6,7)} **Olaf** ♕ | ^{(7)} Karl, governor of Gothland
^{(7)} Ulfhild | ^{(7)} **Frode** ♕ | ^{(7)} Hather, a chief | ^{(7)} **Harald** ♕ | ^{(7)} Signe
^{(7)} Erik† | ^{(7)} Thorhild | ^{(7)} **Halfdan** Biargramm ♕† | ^{(7)} Harald
^{(7)} Asmund
Kings of Norway

Name spellings are derived from Oliver Elton's 1905 translation, The First Nine Books of the Danish History of Saxo Grammaticus, via Wikisource.

== See also ==
- Fróði

== Notes ==
Legendary titles
| Preceded by Huglecus | King of Denmark | Succeeded by Dan III |
