= Fridlevus I =

Fridlevus I is one of the legendary Danish kings described in Saxo Grammaticus' Gesta Danorum.

== Text ==
Gesta Danorum, 4.10	The Danish History, Book Four
Post Dan Fridlevus cognomento Celer imperium sumit. Quo regnante, Huyrvillus Holandiae princeps, icto cum Danis foedere, Norvagiam incessebat. Cuius operibus haud parva claritatis accessio fuit, quod Rusilam virginem militari voto res bellicas aemulatam armis oppressit virilemque gloriam ex muliebri hoste corripuit. Sed et quinque eius complices: Broddonem, Bildum, Bugonem, Fanningum et Gunnolmum, quorum pater Fyn exstitit, ob res ab ipsis praeclare editas in societatem ascivit. Quorum collegio fretus foedus, quod cum Danis contraxerat, ferro disicit. Cuius irruptio hoc nocivior quo fallacior fuit. Neque enim Dani tam repente eum ex amico hostem evasurum credebant. Adeo facilis quorundam ex gratia ad odium transitus exsistere consuevit. Crediderim nostri temporis mores huius viri auspiciis inchoatos, qui mentiri ac fallere inter vitia sordesque non ducimus. Quem Fridlevus australes Syalandiae partes adortum in portu, qui postmodum eius est nomine vocitatus, proelio tentat. In quo ob gloriae aemulationem tanta militum fortitudine concursum est, ut, perpaucis periculum fuga vitantibus, ambae penitus acies consumerentur, nec in partem victoria concessit, ubi par utrosque vulnus implicuit. Adeo omnibus maior gloriae quam vitae cupiditas fuit. Igitur, qui ex Huyrvilli agmine superfuerant, servandae societatis gratia noctu classis suae reliquias mutuis nexibus obligandas curabant. Eadem nocte Bildus et Broddo, rescissis quibus rates cohaesere funiculis, tacite sua a ceterorum complexu navigia submovere, fratrum desertione formidini consulentes magisque timoris quam consanguineae pietatis ductibus obtemperantes. Luce reddita, Fridlevus Huyrvillum, Gunnolmum, Bugonem et Fanningum ex tanta sociorum clade relictos comperiens, unus cum omnibus decernere statuit, ne lacerae copiarum reliquiae denuo discrimen subire cogerentur. Cui praeter insitam animo fortitudinem etiam contemptrix ferri tunica fiduciam ministrabat. Hac in publicis privatisque conflictibus tamquam servatore salutis cultu utebatur. Nec rem fortius quam prosperius exsecutus felicem pugnae eventum habuit, siquidem Huyrvillo, Bugone et Fanningo oppressis, Gunnolmum hostile ferrum carminibus obtundere solitum crebro capuli ictu exanimavit. Dum autem mucroni manum cupidius inserit, elisa nervorum officia reductos in palmam digitos perpetuo curvitatis vinculo perstrinxerunt. Idem cum Duflynum Hyberniae oppidum obsideret murorumque firmitate expugnationis facultatem negari conspiceret, Hadingiani acuminis ingenium aemulatus hirundinum alis inclusum fungis ignem affigi praecepit. Quibus propria nidificatione receptis, subito flammis tecta luxerunt. Quas oppidanis restinguere concurrentibus maioremque sopiendi ignis quam cavendi hostis curam praestantibus, Duflyno potitur. Post haec apud Britanniam amissis bello militibus, cum difficilem ad litus reditum habiturus videretur, interfectorum cadaveribus erectis et in acie collocatis, ita pristinum multitudinis habitum repraesentabat, ut nil ex eius specie tanto vulnere detractum videretur. Quo facto hosti non solum conserendae manus fiduciam abstulit, sed etiam carpendae fugae cupidinem incussit.	After Dan, FRIDLEIF, surnamed the Swift, assumed the sovereignty. During his reign, Huyrwil, the lord of Oland, made a league with the Danes and attacked Norway. No small fame was added to his deeds by the defeat of the amazon Rusila, who aspired with military ardour to prowess in battle: but he gained manly glory over a female foe. Also he took into his alliance, on account of their deeds of prowess, her five partners, the children of Finn, named Brodd, Bild, Bug, Fanning, and Gunholm. Their confederacy emboldened him to break the treaty which he made with the Danes; and the treachery of the violation made it all the more injurious, for the Danes could not believe that he could turn so suddenly from a friend into an enemy; so easily can some veer from goodwill into hate. I suppose that this man inaugurated the morals of our own day, for we do not account lying and treachery as sinful and sordid. When Huyrwil attacked the southern side of Zealand, Fridleif assailed him in the harbour which was afterwards called by Huyrwil's name. In this battle the soldiers, in their rivalry for glory, engaged with such bravery that very few fled to escape peril, and both armies were utterly destroyed; nor did the victory fall to either side, where both were enveloped in an equal ruin. So much more desirous were they all of glory than of life. So the survivors of Huyrwil's army, in order to keep united, had the remnants of their fleet lashed together at night. But, in the same night, Bild and Brodd cut the cables with which the ships were joined, and stealthily severed their own vessels from the rest, thus yielding to their own terrors by deserting their brethren, and obeying the impulses of fear rather than fraternal love. When daylight returned, Fridleif, finding that after the great massacre of their friends only Huyrwil, Gunholm, Bug, and Fanning were left, determined to fight them all single-handed, so that the mangled relics of his fleet might not again have to be imperilled. Besides his innate courage, a shirt of steel-defying mail gave him confidence; a garb which he used to wear in all public battles and in duels, as a preservative of his life. He accomplished his end with as much fortune as courage, and ended the battle successfully. For, after slaying Huyrwil, Bug, and Fanning, he killed Gunholm, who was accustomed to blunt the blade of an enemy with spells, by a shower of blows from his hilt. But while he gripped the blade too eagerly, the sinews, being cut and disabled, contracted the fingers upon the palm, and cramped them with lifelong curvature. While Fridleif was besieging Dublin, a town in Ireland, and saw from the strength of the walls that there was no chance of storming them, he imitated the shrewd wit of Hadding, and ordered fire to be shut up in wicks and fastened to the wings of swallows. When the birds got back in their own nesting-place, the dwellings suddenly flared up; and while the citizens all ran up to quench them, and paid more heed to abating the fire than to looking after the enemy, Fridleif took Dublin. After this he lost his soldiers in Britain, and, thinking that he would find it hard to get back to the coast, he set up the corpses of the slain (Amleth's device) and stationed them in line, thus producing so nearly the look of his original host that its great reverse seemed not to have lessened the show of it a whit. By this deed he not only took out of the enemy all heart for fighting, but inspired them with the desire to make their escape.

The family tree of legendary Kings of the Danes, according to the Gesta Danorum (Books I to VII)

Kings of the Danes are in bold and marked with an asterisk (*). Kings of the Swedes are marked with a dagger (†). Superscript numbers before a name indicate in which books of Gesta Danorum the individual is mentioned.

^{(1)} Humble
KEY
^{(1)} Angul	^{(1)} **Dan***	^{(1)} Grytha	Marriage or coupling
Parent and child
The Angles	^{(1)} **Humble***	^{(1)} **Lother***	^{(1)} King of the Saxons	Succession by other or unclear means
^{(1)} Roar
^{(1)} Sigtryg, King of the Swedes†	^{(1)} **Skiold***	^{(1)} Alfhild
^{(1)} daughter of Roar	^{(1)} Bess
^{(1)} sister of Gram	^{(1)} Gróa	^{(1)} **Gram***†	^{(1)} Sumble, King of the Finns
^{(1)} Wagnhofde
^{(1)} Signe	^{(1)} Henry, King of the Saxons	^{(1)} Hakon, King of the Nitherians
^{(1)} Hardgrep
^{(1)} **Swipdag***†, King of Norway	^{(1)} sister of Guthorm	^{(1)} **Guthorm***	^{(1,2,5)} **Hadding***	^{(1)} Ragnhild
^{(1)} Asmund†	^{(1)} Gunnhild	^{(1)} Guthorm
^{(1,2)} Ulfhild	^{(2)} **Ubbe***
^{(1)} Henry	^{(1)} Uffe†	^{(1,2)} Hunding†	^{(2)} Thorhild	^{(2)} Scot
^{(1)} daughter of Uffe	^{(2)} Ragnar†	^{(2)} Swanhwid	^{(2)} sisters of Swanhwid	^{(2)} Handwan
^{(2)} Thorwald
^{(2,5)} **Frode***	^{(2)} daughter of Handwan
^{(2,3)} Hothbrodd†	^{(2)} **Halfdan***	^{(2)} Ro	^{(2)} Skat
^{(2)} Thora
^{(2,3)} **Helge***	^{(2)} **Ro***
^{(2,3)} Athisl†	^{(2)} Urse
^{(2,3)} King Gewar	^{(2,3)} **Rolf***† Krage	^{(2)} Rute	^{(2)} Bjarke	^{(2)} Skulde	^{(2,3)} **Hiartuar**†*
^{(2,3)} **Hother**†*	^{(3)} Nanna	^{(3)} Herlek	^{(3)} Gerit
^{(3)} former King of Britain	^{(3)} mother of the King of Britain	^{(3)} a slave	^{(3)} a bondmaid	^{(3)} **Rorik***	^{(3)} Gerwendil
^{(3,4)} King of Britain	^{(3,4)} Queen of Britain	^{(3,4)} Gerutha	^{(3,4)} Horwendil	^{(3,4)} Feng
^{(3,4)} foster sister of Amleth	^{(3,4)} daughter of the King of Britain	^{(3,4)} Amleth	^{(4)} Hermutrude, Queen of Scotland	^{(4)} **Wiglek***
^{(4)} son of Amleth	^{(4)} **Wermund***	^{(4)} Frowin, governor of Sleswik
^{(4)} **Uffe***, aka Olaf the Gentle	^{(4)} daughter of Frowin	^{(4)} Ket	^{(4)} Wig
^{(4)} **Dan***
^{(4)} **Hugleik***
^{(4)} **Frode*** the Vigorous
^{(4)} **Dan***
^{(5)} Kraka	^{(5)} Ragnar	^{(5)} Brak	^{(4,5)} **Fridleif*** the Swift	^{(5)} Hun, King of the Huns	^{(5)} Hun
^{(5)} Gotar, King of Norway	^{(5)} Westmar	^{(5)} Koll	^{(5)} Gotwar
^{(5)} Roller	^{(5,6)} Erik† Shrewd-spoken	^{(5)} Gunwar the Fair	^{(5)} Alfhild	^{(5,6)} **Frode***	^{(5)} Hanund	^{(5)} Grep (eldest of three)	^{(5)} 11 other sons (two named Grep)
^{(6)} Hythin, King of Tellemark	^{(5)} Alf	^{(5)} Eyfura	^{(5)} Arngrim	^{(6)} Grubb	^{(6)} **Hiarn***	^{(6)} Amund, King of Norway
^{(6)} child of Hythin	^{(6)} Halfdan†	^{(5)} 12 sons, including Anganty	^{(6)} Ane	^{(6)} Juritha	^{(6)} **Fridleif***	^{(6)} Frogertha
^{(6)} Hanef, King of Saxony	^{(6)} Swerting, King of Saxony	^{(6)} Olaf	^{(6)} **Frode***
^{(6,7)} Siward†	^{(6)} sons of Swerting	^{(6)} sister of the sons of Swerting	^{(6,7)} **Ingild***	^{(6)} Helga	^{(6)} Helge	^{(6)} Asa
^{(6,7)} Frode	^{(6,7)} Fridleif	^{(6,7)} Ingild	^{(6,7)} **Olaf***	^{(7)} Karl, governor of Gothland
^{(7)} Ulfhild	^{(7)} **Frode***	^{(7)} Hather, a chief	^{(7)} **Harald***	^{(7)} Signe
^{(7)} Erik†	^{(7)} Thorhild	^{(7)} **Halfdan***† Biargramm	^{(7)} Harald
^{(7)} Asmund
Kings of Norway

Name spellings are derived from Oliver Elton's 1905 translation, The First Nine Books of the Danish History of Saxo Grammaticus, via Wikisource.

== Notes ==
Legendary titles
Preceded by Dan III	King of Denmark	Succeeded by Frotho III
