= Roar (Dane) =

Danish man in Gesta Danorum

- Religion: Pagan

Roar or Roari was a Danish man in Gesta Danorum. He helped raise Prince Gram and trained him in swordsmanship. He later married his daughter to him. However, this marriage ended when Gram grew tired of his wife and arranged her marriage to his retainer, Bess.

== The text ==
Gesta Danorum, Book One
He took to wife the daughter of his upbringer, Roar, she being his foster-sister and of his own years, in order the better to show his gratefulness for his nursing. A little while after he gave her in marriage to a certain Bess, since he had ofttimes used his strenuous service.
