= Harðgreipr =

Norse mythical character

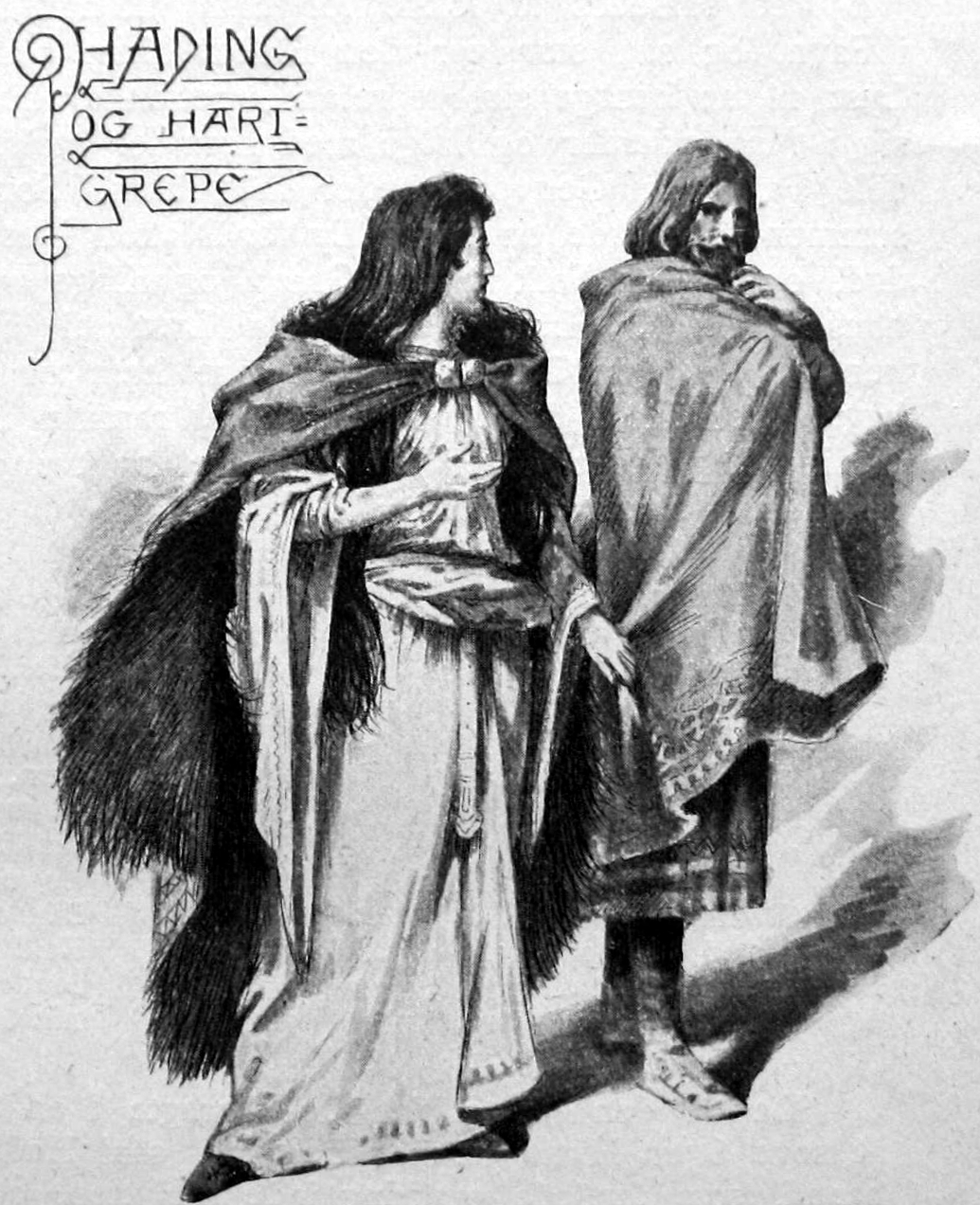
Hartgrepe, depicted seducing King Hadingus

Harðgreipr (or Harthgrepa; Old Norse: [ˈhɑrðˌɡrɛipz̠], 'Hard-grip') is a jötunn in Norse mythology. In Gesta Danorum, she is the daughter of the jötunn Vagnophtus and the nurse of the Danish hero Hadingus.

== Name ==
The Old Norse name 'Harðgreipr' has been translated as 'hard-grip'. It is a compound formed with the adjective harðr ('hard, strong') attached to the root greip- ('hand [with spread thumbs], handle'). The meaning could be explained by the episode in which Harthgrepa (Harðgreipr) grips a gigantic hand that is trying to enter her shelter.

The 13th-century Danish historian Saxo Grammaticus gives her name as Harthgrepa in Gesta Danorum.

== Attestations ==
In Gesta Danorum (Deed of Danes), Harthgrepa (Harðgreipr) becomes the wet-nurse, lover and road companion of the Danish hero Hadingus (Hadding), who his seeking revenge after the murder of his father the king Gram.

Harthgrepa, the child of Vagnhofth, tried to soften his [Hadding's] stout spirit by her allurement to love, with repeated assertions that he must pay her the first gift of his nuptial bed by marrying her, since she had nurtured him in his infancy with particular devotion and given him his first rattle.

— Gesta Danorum, 1.6.2, transl. P. Fisher, 2015.

Harthgrepa is trying to seduce Hadingus, but the latter answers that "the size her body [is] unwieldy for human embrace". Since she is a jötunn, however, Harthgrepa is able to disguise as a man and accompany Hadingus on his journey.

'Don't let the sight of my strange largeness affect you. I can make the substance of my body smaller or greater, now thin, now capacious ... I become huge to fright the fierce, but small to lie with men.' ... With these declarations she won over Hadding to sleep with her and burned so strongly with love for the young man that, when she discovered that he yearned to revisit his own country, she lost no time in accompanying him, dressed like a man...

— Gesta Danorum, 1.6.3–1.6.4, transl. P. Fisher, 2015.

Later on, "desiring to probe the will of the gods by her clairvoyant magic", she has Hadingus place a stick carved with "most gruesome spells" (perhaps in runes) under the tongue of a dead man. The corpse, forced to speak "in a voice terrible to ear" by the magical item, curses the one who summoned him, then predicts the death of Harthgrepa, "weighted down by her own offence".

In the following episode, she is able to defeat a gigantic hand that is trying to enter their brushwood-made shelter as she and Haddingus are sleeping.

...they saw a hand of enormous magnitude creeping right inside their small hut distraught at this apparition and cried for his nurse's help. Harthgrepa, unfolding her limbs and swelling to giant dimensions, gripped the hand fast...

— Gesta Danorum, 1.6.6, transl. P. Fisher, 2015.

As the corpse has predicted, Harthgrepa eventually pays for the offence she has made to him, and she ends up "lacerated by companions of her own race [jötnar]". The author of Gesta Danorum, Saxo Grammaticus, adds that "neither her special nature nor her bodily size helped her to escape the savage nails of her assailants".

In the Icelandic þulur, Harðgreipr appears in a list of jötnar.

== Theories ==
According to scholar John Lindow, Hadingus has "numerous Odinic traits" and "certainly tarrying with a giantess is an Odinic act..." Lindow interprets the episode of Harðgreipr having Hadingus place spells under the tongue of a corpse as an initiation into one of Odin's realms, necromancy.

=== Georges Dumézil's interpretation ===
In The Saga of Hadingus, Georges Dumézil tries to demonstrate that the legend of Hadingus shows many similarities with myths concerning the god Njörðr, and more generally that Hadingus shares many features with the Vanir. Some of his arguments have to do with Hadingus' relationship with Harthgrepa.

Before their integration into the Æsir, the Vanir used to have incestuous relationships (Freyr and Freyja are for instance Njörðr and his sister's children). Hadingus' relationship with Harthgrepa is a quasi-incestuous one, all the more so that Harthgrepa insists on the fact that she was like a mother to him.

Dumézil also draws a parallel between Hadingus / Harthgrepa relationship and the one between Freyr / Gunnar helming and Freyr’s priestess as related in Ögmundar þáttr dytts.

He also reminds that the Vanir used to practise this kind of magic known as seid. Even if Harthgrepa's magic (compelling a dead man to speak) does not come within the seid practices, both are described as shameful and liable to a punishment. In this respect, Harthgrepa's death can be compared to the Æsir's attempts to kill Gullveig.
