= Bess (Dane) =

Legendary Danish general

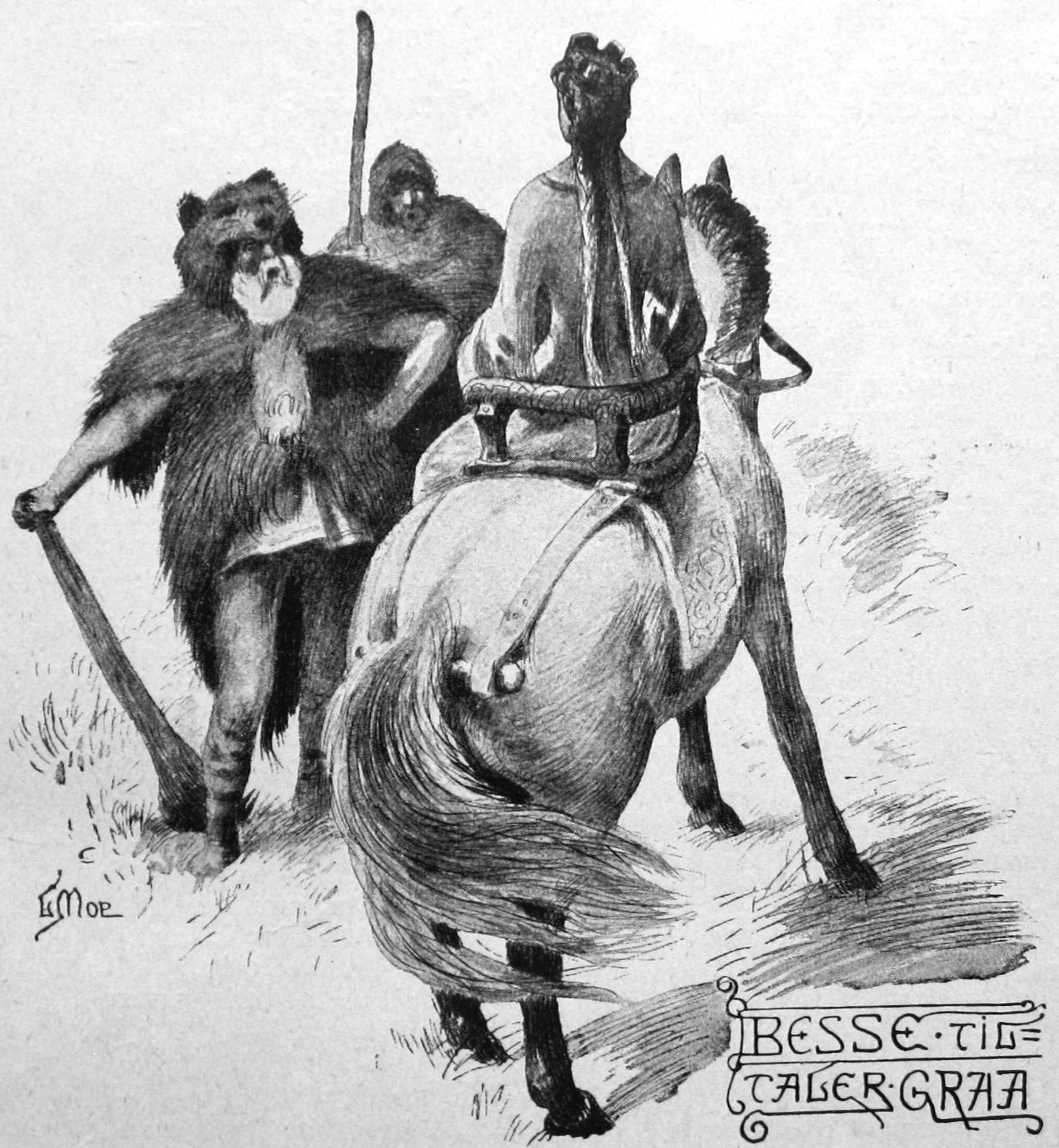
- Religion: Pagan

Bess or Bessus was a legendary Danish general mentioned in Gesta Danorum. His master, Prince Gram gave his wife to him after he grew tired of her. Later Bess served as the principal general of Gram during his invasion of Sweden and led the negotiations with the future wife of Gram, Groa. After Gram married Groa, Bess urged the continuation of war, which eventually led to the death of the Swedish king.

== The text ==
Gesta Danorum, Book One
A little while after he gave her in marriage to a certain Bess, since he had ofttimes used his strenuous service. In this partner of his warlike deeds he put his trust; and he has left it a question whether he has won more renown by Bess's valour or his own.
Having won Groa, Bess proceeded and learnt that the road was beset by two robbers. These he slew simply by charging them as they rushed covetously forth to despoil him. This done, loth to seem to have done any service to the soil of an enemy, he put timbers under the carcases of the slain, fastened them thereto, and stretched them so as to counterfeit an upright standing position; so that in their death they might menace in seeming those whom their life had harmed in truth; and that, terrible even after their decease, they might block the road in effigy as much as they had once in deed. Whence it appears that in slaying the robbers he took thought for himself and not for Sweden: for he betokened by so singular an act how great a hatred of Sweden filled him. Having heard from the diviners that Sigtryg could only be conquered by gold, he straightway fixed a knob of gold to a wooden mace, equipped himself therewith in the war wherein he attacked the king, and obtained his desire.
