= Oliver Elton =

English literary scholar

Oliver Elton, FBA (3 June 1861 – 4 June 1945) was an English literary scholar whose works include A Survey of English Literature (1730–1880) in six volumes, criticism, biography, and translations from several languages including Icelandic and Russian. He was King Alfred Professor of English at Liverpool University. He also helped set up the Department of English at the University of the Punjab, Lahore, Pakistan.

== Early life ==
Born at Holt, Norfolk, on 3 June 1861, Elton was the only child of Sarah and the Reverend Charles Allen Elton (1820–1887), the headmaster of Gresham's School, where Oliver was taught by his father until he proceeded to Marlborough College and Corpus Christi College, Oxford, where he was a scholar from 1880 to 1885. He graduated with a BA with first class honours in Literae Humaniores in 1884.

His friends at Oxford included Leonard Huxley, Michael Sadler and Dugald Sutherland MacColl, whose sister he later married.

== Career ==
Elton's first work was as a tutor and lecturer in London, while preparing school editions of Shakespeare and Milton. He translated Einar Hafliðason's Laurentius Saga as The Life of Laurence Bishop of Hólar in Iceland (Lárentíus Kálfsson) into English. In this he was encouraged by Frederick York Powell, whose biography Elton would later publish in 1906.

In 1890 he went as a lecturer to Owens College, Manchester, remaining for ten years. During his time there he published a translation of nine of the books of the Gesta Danorum by Saxo Grammaticus, a study of Michael Drayton, and The Augustan Ages (1899) which brought him recognition from the academic literary world. Meanwhile, he got to know Charles Edward Montague and wrote for the Manchester Guardian.

He went to Liverpool in 1901 as Professor of English Literature and stayed till his retirement in 1925. While there, he completed two-thirds (four volumes) of his Survey of English Literature and lectured and wrote on Milton, Tennyson, Henry James, Chekhov and others.

After retirement he went to Harvard as a visiting professor and later settled in Oxford. He completed the Survey of English Literature, and published a book on English poetry: The English Muse: a Sketch (1933). He also continued an interest in Russian and other Slavic literature (mainly Serbian) which had begun during the first world war, and published further translations, notably of Pushkin's Eugene Onegin (1937).

Elton's encyclopedic range is impressive. George Sampson, in the Cambridge History of English Literature, brackets him with two of his contemporaries who were also "scholars on the heroic scale of learning": William Paton Ker and George Saintsbury.

== Family ==
In 1888 Elton married Letitia Maynard MacColl, the sister of his Oxford friend Dugald Sutherland MacColl. Letitia became a children's writer. They had three sons, one of whom was the biologist Charles Sutherland Elton.
