= Dit de l'empereur Constant =

Old French fictional text about the birth and youth of Constantine the Great

Dit de l'empereur Constant (Le dit de l'empereour Coustant) is an Old French work about the birth and youth of Constantine the Great. It survives in a verse and in a prose version. The verse version has 630 octosyllabic rhyming lines. It survives in a single manuscript, Det Kongelige Bibliotek, GKS 2061 4°, foll. 149vb-154ra (ed. Wesselofsky, 1877). The prose version is from BNF français, 24430. A critical edition of both versions was published by Coveney (1955).

Dated to the second half of the 13th century, the work redeploys the motif of the "swan-children" known from earlier romances, as well as a number of episodes known from the Roman de Silence. It is the earliest known representative of the medieval cycle of legends attached to Constantine the Great. The narrative follows the following lines: Prophesy to the emperor announcing the wedding of his newly-born daughter with the newly-born son of a commoner, opposition of the emperor against this dishonorable union, attempted infanticide, abandonment and fostering of the child, rediscovery of the young Constantine, renewed attempt at having Constantine killed by sending him as a messenger bearing a "treacherous letter" (advising the recipient to kill the bearer, as in Bellerophon and Amleth), chance meeting with the emperor's daughter in the imperial gardens, substitution of the traitorous letter with one advising the marriage of the bearer to the princess, and finally the marriage of the hero and his inheritance of the realm.

== Translations ==
- E. M. Wilmot-Buxton, Stories from Old French Romance, around 1910, F. A. Stokes Company, New York, pp. 22-29.
- Eugene Mason, The Story of King Constant, Cambridge (Ontario), 2001.

== Bibliography ==
- Raynaud de Lage, Guy, et Christine Ruby, « Empereur Constant », Dictionnaire des lettres françaises: le Moyen Âge, éd. Geneviève Hasenohr et Michel Zink, Paris, Fayard, 1992, p. 405.
- Wesselofsky, A. N., « Constantinische Sagen », Russische Revue, 6, 1875, p. 178-207.
- Wesselofsky, A. N., « Le dit de l'empereur Coustant », Romania, 6, 1877, p. 161-198.
- Taylor, Steven M., « Constantine the Great: folk hero of the fourth crusade », Neophilologus, 64, 1980, p. 32-37.
- L. Moland, C. d'Héricault (eds.), Nouvelles françoises en prose du XIIIe siècle publiées d'après les manuscrits, Paris, Jannet (Bibliothèque elzévirienne), 1856, pp. 3-32.
- James Coveney, Édition critique des versions en vers et en prose de "La légende de l'empereur Constant" avec une étude linguistique et littéraire, Paris, Les Belles Lettres (Publications de la Faculté des lettres de l'Université de Strasbourg, 126), 1955.
