= Wermund =

Ancestor of the Mercian royal family

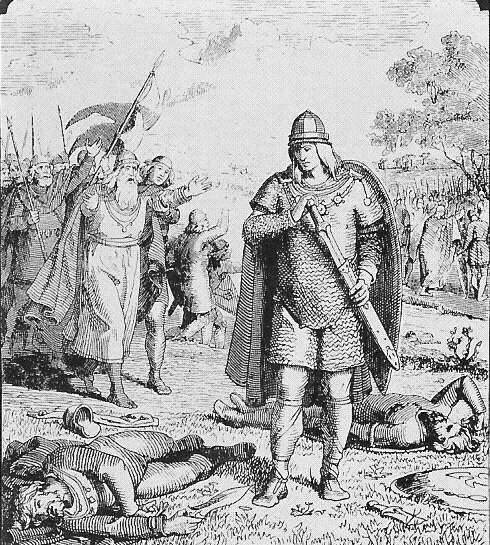
Wermund runs to embrace his victorious son Offa. Illustration by the Danish Lorenz Frølich in a 19th-century book.

Wermund, Vermund or Garmund is an ancestor of the Mercian royal family, a son of Wihtlaeg and father of Offa. The Anglo-Saxon Chronicle makes him a grandson of Woden, but the Gesta Danorum written by Saxo Grammaticus goes no further than his father, while the Brevis Historia Regum Dacie of Sven Aggesen makes Wermund son of king Frothi hin Frokni.

According to the Gesta Danorum, his reign was long and happy, though its prosperity was eventually marred by the raids of a warlike king named Athislus, who slew Frowinus, the governor of Schleswig, in battle. Frowinus's death was avenged by his two sons, Keto and Wigo, but their conduct in fighting together against a single man was thought to constitute a national disgrace, which was only reconciled by the subsequent single combat of Offa.

It has been suggested that Athislus, though called king of the Swedes by Saxo, was really identical with the Eadgils, king of the Myrgings, mentioned in Widsith, and Frowinus and Wigo are identified with the Freawine and Wig who figure among the ancestors of the kings of Wessex in the Anglo-Saxon royal genealogies. As Eadgils was a contemporary of Ermanaric, who died about 376, his date would agree with the indication given by the genealogies which place Wermund nine generations before Penda of Mercia.

He is mentioned in lines 1958-1963 of the Anglo-Saxon epic Beowulf as Garmund the father of Offa of Angel and grandfather of Eomer.

...forþam Offa wæs geofum and guðum gar-cene man, wide geweorðod; wisdome heold eðel sinne, þonon Eomær woc hæleðum to helpe, Heminges mæg, nefa Garmundes, niða cræftig.	...Hence Offa was praised for his fighting and feeing by far-off men, the spear-bold warrior; wisely he ruled over his empire. Eomer woke to him, help of heroes, Hemming's kinsman, Grandson of Garmund, grim in war.(Gummere's translation)

The family tree of legendary Kings of the Danes, according to the Gesta Danorum (Books I to VII)

Kings of the Danes are in bold and marked with an asterisk (*). Kings of the Swedes are marked with a dagger (†). Superscript numbers before a name indicate in which books of Gesta Danorum the individual is mentioned.

^{(1)} Humble
KEY
^{(1)} Angul	^{(1)} **Dan***	^{(1)} Grytha	Marriage or coupling
Parent and child
The Angles	^{(1)} **Humble***	^{(1)} **Lother***	^{(1)} King of the Saxons	Succession by other or unclear means
^{(1)} Roar
^{(1)} Sigtryg, King of the Swedes†	^{(1)} **Skiold***	^{(1)} Alfhild
^{(1)} daughter of Roar	^{(1)} Bess
^{(1)} sister of Gram	^{(1)} Gróa	^{(1)} **Gram***†	^{(1)} Sumble, King of the Finns
^{(1)} Wagnhofde
^{(1)} Signe	^{(1)} Henry, King of the Saxons	^{(1)} Hakon, King of the Nitherians
^{(1)} Hardgrep
^{(1)} **Swipdag***†, King of Norway	^{(1)} sister of Guthorm	^{(1)} **Guthorm***	^{(1,2,5)} **Hadding***	^{(1)} Ragnhild
^{(1)} Asmund†	^{(1)} Gunnhild	^{(1)} Guthorm
^{(1,2)} Ulfhild	^{(2)} **Ubbe***
^{(1)} Henry	^{(1)} Uffe†	^{(1,2)} Hunding†	^{(2)} Thorhild	^{(2)} Scot
^{(1)} daughter of Uffe	^{(2)} Ragnar†	^{(2)} Swanhwid	^{(2)} sisters of Swanhwid	^{(2)} Handwan
^{(2)} Thorwald
^{(2,5)} **Frode***	^{(2)} daughter of Handwan
^{(2,3)} Hothbrodd†	^{(2)} **Halfdan***	^{(2)} Ro	^{(2)} Skat
^{(2)} Thora
^{(2,3)} **Helge***	^{(2)} **Ro***
^{(2,3)} Athisl†	^{(2)} Urse
^{(2,3)} King Gewar	^{(2,3)} **Rolf***† Krage	^{(2)} Rute	^{(2)} Bjarke	^{(2)} Skulde	^{(2,3)} **Hiartuar**†*
^{(2,3)} **Hother**†*	^{(3)} Nanna	^{(3)} Herlek	^{(3)} Gerit
^{(3)} former King of Britain	^{(3)} mother of the King of Britain	^{(3)} a slave	^{(3)} a bondmaid	^{(3)} **Rorik***	^{(3)} Gerwendil
^{(3,4)} King of Britain	^{(3,4)} Queen of Britain	^{(3,4)} Gerutha	^{(3,4)} Horwendil	^{(3,4)} Feng
^{(3,4)} foster sister of Amleth	^{(3,4)} daughter of the King of Britain	^{(3,4)} Amleth	^{(4)} Hermutrude, Queen of Scotland	^{(4)} **Wiglek***
^{(4)} son of Amleth	^{(4)} **Wermund***	^{(4)} Frowin, governor of Sleswik
^{(4)} **Uffe***, aka Olaf the Gentle	^{(4)} daughter of Frowin	^{(4)} Ket	^{(4)} Wig
^{(4)} **Dan***
^{(4)} **Hugleik***
^{(4)} **Frode*** the Vigorous
^{(4)} **Dan***
^{(5)} Kraka	^{(5)} Ragnar	^{(5)} Brak	^{(4,5)} **Fridleif*** the Swift	^{(5)} Hun, King of the Huns	^{(5)} Hun
^{(5)} Gotar, King of Norway	^{(5)} Westmar	^{(5)} Koll	^{(5)} Gotwar
^{(5)} Roller	^{(5,6)} Erik† Shrewd-spoken	^{(5)} Gunwar the Fair	^{(5)} Alfhild	^{(5,6)} **Frode***	^{(5)} Hanund	^{(5)} Grep (eldest of three)	^{(5)} 11 other sons (two named Grep)
^{(6)} Hythin, King of Tellemark	^{(5)} Alf	^{(5)} Eyfura	^{(5)} Arngrim	^{(6)} Grubb	^{(6)} **Hiarn***	^{(6)} Amund, King of Norway
^{(6)} child of Hythin	^{(6)} Halfdan†	^{(5)} 12 sons, including Anganty	^{(6)} Ane	^{(6)} Juritha	^{(6)} **Fridleif***	^{(6)} Frogertha
^{(6)} Hanef, King of Saxony	^{(6)} Swerting, King of Saxony	^{(6)} Olaf	^{(6)} **Frode***
^{(6,7)} Siward†	^{(6)} sons of Swerting	^{(6)} sister of the sons of Swerting	^{(6,7)} **Ingild***	^{(6)} Helga	^{(6)} Helge	^{(6)} Asa
^{(6,7)} Frode	^{(6,7)} Fridleif	^{(6,7)} Ingild	^{(6,7)} **Olaf***	^{(7)} Karl, governor of Gothland
^{(7)} Ulfhild	^{(7)} **Frode***	^{(7)} Hather, a chief	^{(7)} **Harald***	^{(7)} Signe
^{(7)} Erik†	^{(7)} Thorhild	^{(7)} **Halfdan***† Biargramm	^{(7)} Harald
^{(7)} Asmund
Kings of Norway

Name spellings are derived from Oliver Elton's 1905 translation, The First Nine Books of the Danish History of Saxo Grammaticus, via Wikisource.

Legendary titles
Preceded by Wihtlæg	King of the Angles	Succeeded by Offa of Angel
Preceded by Wiglek	King of Denmark	Succeeded by Uffo
