= Dan I of Denmark =

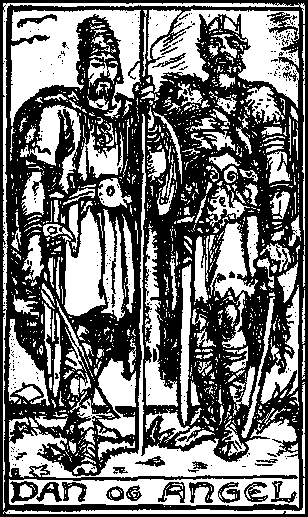

King of the Danes
- Successor: Humblus
- Consort: Grytha
- Issue: Humble; Lother
- House: Scylding
- Father: Humble
- Religion: Pagan

Dan I was the progenitor of the Danish royal house according to Saxo Grammaticus's Gesta Danorum. He supposedly held the lordship of Denmark along with his brother Angul, the father of the Angles in Angeln, which later formed the Anglo-Saxons in England.

== Text ==
Gesta Danorum, 1.1	The Danish History, Book One
Dan igitur et Angul, a quibus Danorum coepit origo, patre Humblo procreati non solum conditores gentis nostrae, verum etiam rectores fuere. Quamquam Dudo, rerum Aquitanicarum scriptor, Danos a Danais ortos nuncupatosque recenseat. Hi licet faventibus patriae votis regni dominio potirentur rerumque summam ob egregia fortitudinis merita assentientibus civium suffragiis obtinerent, regii tamen nominis expertes degebant, cuius usum nulla tunc temporis apud nostros consuetudinum frequentabat auctoritas. Ex quibus Angul, a quo gentis Anglicae principia manasse memoriae proditum est, nomen suum provinciae, cui praeerat, aptandum curavit, levi monumenti genere perennem sui notitiam traditurus. Cuius successores postmodum Britannia potiti priscum insulae nomen novo patriae suae vocabulo permutarunt. Magni id factum a veteribus aestimatum. Testis est Beda, non minima pars divini stili, qui in Anglia ortus sanctissimis suorum voluminum thesauris res patrias sociare curae habuit, aeque ad religionem pertinere iudicans patriae facta litteris illustrare et res divinas conscribere. Verum a Dan (ut fert antiquitas) regum nostrorum stemmata, ceu quodam derivata principio, splendido successionis ordine profluxerunt. Huic filii Humblus et Lotherus fuere, ex Grytha summae inter Theutones dignitatis matrona suscepti.	Now Dan and Angul, with whom the stock of the Danes begins, were begotten of Humble, their father, and were the governors and not only the founders of our race. (Yet Dudo, the historian of Normandy, considers that the Danes are sprung and named from the Danai. And these two men, though by the wish and favour of their country they gained the lordship of the realm, and, owing to the wondrous deserts of their bravery, got the supreme power by the consenting voice of their countrymen, yet lived without the name of king: the usage whereof was not then commonly resorted to by any authority among our people. Of these two, Angul, the fountain, so runs the tradition, of the beginnings of the Anglian race, caused his name to be applied to the district which he ruled. This was an easy kind of memorial wherewith to immortalise his fame: for his successors a little later, when they gained possession of Britain, changed the original name of the island for a fresh title, that of their own land. This action was much thought of by the ancients: witness Bede, no mean figure among the writers of the Church, who was a native of England, and made it his care to embody the doings of his country in the most hallowed treasury of his pages; deeming it equally a religious duty to glorify in writing the deeds of his land, and to chronicle the history of the Church. From Dan, however, so saith antiquity; the pedigrees of our kings have flowed in glorious series, like channels from some parent spring. Grytha, a matron most highly revered among the Teutons, bore him two sons, HUMBLE and LOTHER.

The family tree of legendary Kings of the Danes, according to the Gesta Danorum (Books I to VII)

Kings of the Danes are in bold and marked with a crown (♕). Kings of the Swedes are marked with a dagger (†). Superscript numbers before a name indicate in which books of Gesta Danorum the individual is mentioned.

^{(1)} Humble
KEY
^{(1)} Angul	^{(1)} **Dan** ♕	^{(1)} Grytha	Marriage or coupling
Parent and child
The Angles	^{(1)} **Humble** ♕	^{(1)} **Lother** ♕	^{(1)} King of the Saxons	Succession by other or unclear means
^{(1)} Roar
^{(1)} Sigtryg, King of the Swedes†	^{(1)} **Skiold** ♕	^{(1)} Alfhild
^{(1)} daughter of Roar	^{(1)} Bess
^{(1)} sister of Gram	^{(1)} Gróa	^{(1)} **Gram** ♕†	^{(1)} Sumble, King of the Finns
^{(1)} Wagnhofde
^{(1)} Signe	^{(1)} Henry, King of the Saxons	^{(1)} Hakon, King of the Nitherians
^{(1)} Hardgrep
^{(1)} **Swipdag** ♕†, King of Norway	^{(1)} sister of Guthorm	^{(1)} **Guthorm** ♕	^{(1,2,5)} **Hadding** ♕	^{(1)} Ragnhild
^{(1)} Asmund†	^{(1)} Gunnhild	^{(1)} Guthorm
^{(1,2)} Ulfhild	^{(2)} **Ubbe** ♕
^{(1)} Henry	^{(1)} Uffe†	^{(1,2)} Hunding†	^{(2)} Thorhild	^{(2)} Scot
^{(1)} daughter of Uffe	^{(2)} Ragnar†	^{(2)} Swanhwid	^{(2)} sisters of Swanhwid	^{(2)} Handwan
^{(2)} Thorwald
^{(2,5)} **Frode** ♕	^{(2)} daughter of Handwan
^{(2,3)} Hothbrodd†	^{(2)} **Halfdan** ♕	^{(2)} Ro	^{(2)} Skat
^{(2)} Thora
^{(2,3)} **Helge** ♕	^{(2)} **Ro** ♕
^{(2,3)} Athisl†	^{(2)} Urse
^{(2,3)} King Gewar	^{(2,3)} **Rolf** Krage ♕†	^{(2)} Rute	^{(2)} Bjarke	^{(2)} Skulde	^{(2,3)} **Hiartuar** †♕
^{(2,3)} **Hother** †♕	^{(3)} Nanna	^{(3)} Herlek	^{(3)} Gerit
^{(3)} former King of Britain	^{(3)} mother of the King of Britain	^{(3)} a slave	^{(3)} a bondmaid	^{(3)} **Rorik** Slyngebond ♕	^{(3)} Gerwendil
^{(3,4)} King of Britain	^{(3,4)} Queen of Britain	^{(3,4)} Gerutha	^{(3,4)} Horwendil	^{(3,4)} Feng
^{(3,4)} foster sister of Amleth	^{(3,4)} daughter of the King of Britain	^{(3,4)} Amleth	^{(4)} Hermutrude, Queen of Scotland	^{(4)} **Wiglek** ♕
^{(4)} son of Amleth	^{(4)} **Wermund** ♕	^{(4)} Frowin, governor of Sleswik
^{(4)} **Uffe** ♕, aka Olaf the Gentle	^{(4)} daughter of Frowin	^{(4)} Ket	^{(4)} Wig
^{(4)} **Dan** ♕
^{(4)} **Hugleik** ♕
^{(4)} **Frode** the Vigorous ♕
^{(4)} **Dan** ♕
^{(5)} Kraka	^{(5)} Ragnar	^{(5)} Brak	^{(4,5)} **Fridleif** the Swift ♕	^{(5)} Hun, King of the Huns	^{(5)} Hun
^{(5)} Gotar, King of Norway	^{(5)} Westmar	^{(5)} Koll	^{(5)} Gotwar
^{(5)} Roller	^{(5,6)} Erik† Shrewd-spoken	^{(5)} Gunwar the Fair	^{(5)} Alfhild	^{(5,6)} **Frode** ♕	^{(5)} Hanund	^{(5)} Grep (eldest of three)	^{(5)} 11 other sons (two named Grep)
^{(6)} Hythin, King of Tellemark	^{(5)} Alf	^{(5)} Eyfura	^{(5)} Arngrim	^{(6)} Grubb	^{(6)} **Hiarn** ♕	^{(6)} Amund, King of Norway
^{(6)} child of Hythin	^{(6)} Halfdan†	^{(5)} 12 sons, including Anganty	^{(6)} Ane	^{(6)} Juritha	^{(6)} **Fridleif** ♕	^{(6)} Frogertha
^{(6)} Hanef, King of Saxony	^{(6)} Swerting, King of Saxony	^{(6)} Olaf	^{(6)} **Frode** ♕
^{(6,7)} Siward†	^{(6)} sons of Swerting	^{(6)} sister of the sons of Swerting	^{(6,7)} **Ingild** ♕	^{(6)} Helga	^{(6)} Helge	^{(6)} Asa
^{(6,7)} Frode	^{(6,7)} Fridleif	^{(6,7)} Ingild	^{(6,7)} **Olaf** ♕	^{(7)} Karl, governor of Gothland
^{(7)} Ulfhild	^{(7)} **Frode** ♕	^{(7)} Hather, a chief	^{(7)} **Harald** ♕	^{(7)} Signe
^{(7)} Erik†	^{(7)} Thorhild	^{(7)} **Halfdan** Biargramm ♕†	^{(7)} Harald
^{(7)} Asmund
Kings of Norway

Name spellings are derived from Oliver Elton's 1905 translation, The First Nine Books of the Danish History of Saxo Grammaticus, via Wikisource.

== See also ==
- Dan (king)

== Notes ==
Legendary titles
First	King of the Danes	Succeeded by Humblus
