= Hadingus =

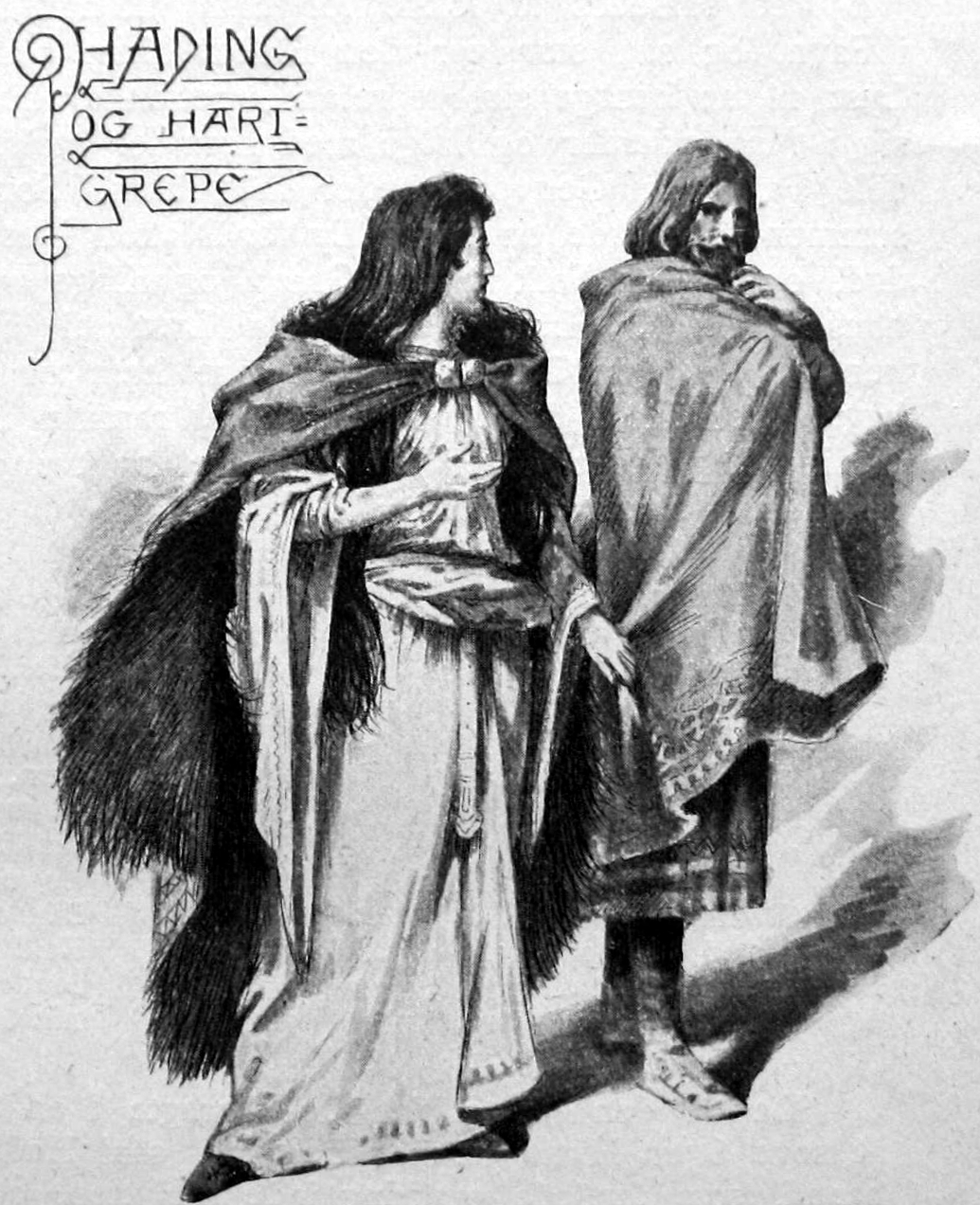

King of the Danes
- Predecessor: Svipdagr
- Successor: Frotho I
- House: Scylding
- Father: Gram
- Mother: Signe
- Religion: Pagan

Hadingus or Hading was one of the earliest legendary Danish kings. He is mentioned is Saxo Grammaticus' Gesta Danorum, where he has a detailed biography, and briefly in the Codex Runicus. Georges Dumézil and others have argued that Hadingus was partially modelled on the god Njörðr.

== Gesta Danorum ==
Hadingus is the legendary son of Gram of Denmark and Signe, the daughter of Finnish King Sumble. Gram steals Signe from her wedding, kills the husband (Henry, King of Saxony) and takes her to Denmark, where Hadingus is born. When Gram is killed by Swipdag, King of Norway, Hadingus is taken to Sweden and is fostered by the giant Wagnofthus and his daughter Harthgrepa. He is eager to become a warrior but Harthgrepa tries to dissuade him from it in favor of entering into a quasi-incestuous love-relationship with her.

Why doth thy life thus waste and wander? Why dost thou pass thy years unwed, following arms, thirsting for throats? Nor does my beauty draw thy vows. Carried away by excess of frenzy, thou art little prone to love. Steeped in blood and slaughter, thou judgest wars better than the bed, nor refreshest thy soul with incitements. Thy fierceness finds no leisure; dalliance is far from thee, and savagery fostered. Nor is thy hand free from blasphemy while thou loathest the rites of love. Let this hateful strictness pass away, let that loving warmth approach, and plight the troth of love to me, who gave thee the first breasts of milk in childhood, and helped thee, playing a mother's part, duteous to thy needs. The Danish History, Book One

Hadingus accepts Harthgrepa's embraces and when he wants to travel back to Denmark she accompanies him. After raising a man from the dead to obtain information, Harthgrepa is killed by supernatural beings. At this point Hadingus acquires a new patron, Odin, who predicts his future and gives him advice.

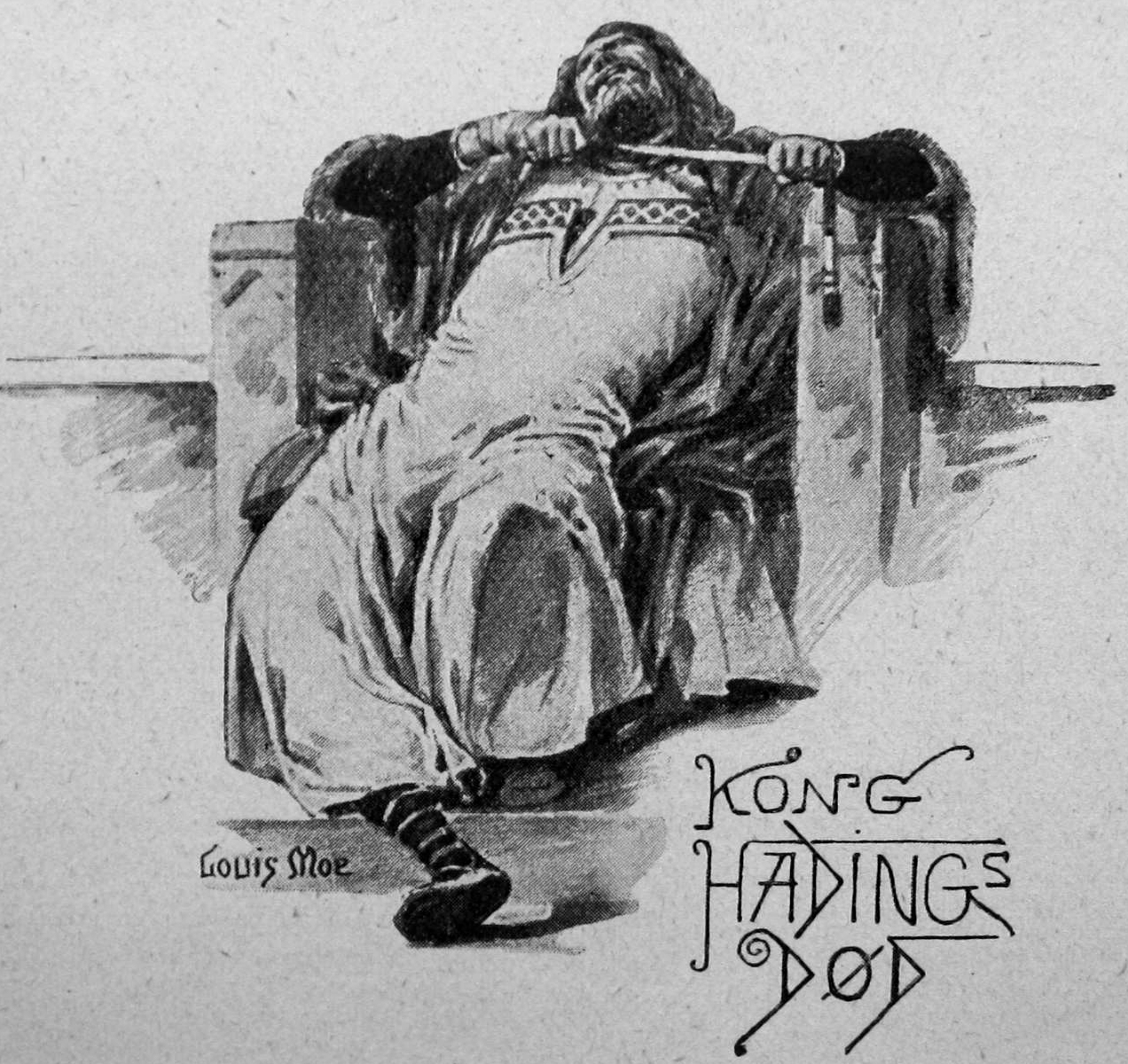
The death of Hadingus, illustration by Louis Moe

Hadingus wages wars in the Baltic and achieves victory and renown. He then returns to Scandinavia, defeats Suibdagerus, his father's slayer, and becomes king of Denmark. As king he has an eventful career ahead of him. He wars with Norwegians and Swedes, offends a god by killing a divine animal and atones for it by a sacrifice to Freyr, he rescues the princess Regnilda from giants and takes her as a wife, visits the underworld, participates in more wars and dies by hanging himself in front of his subjects.

The story of Hadding is retold in fictionalized form by Poul Anderson in the novel War of the Gods.

The family tree of legendary Kings of the Danes, according to the Gesta Danorum (Books I to VII)

Kings of the Danes are in bold and marked with a crown (♕). Kings of the Swedes are marked with a dagger (†). Superscript numbers before a name indicate in which books of Gesta Danorum the individual is mentioned.

^{(1)} Humble
KEY
^{(1)} Angul | ^{(1)} **Dan** ♕ | ^{(1)} Grytha | Marriage or coupling
Parent and child
The Angles | ^{(1)} **Humble** ♕ | ^{(1)} **Lother** ♕ | ^{(1)} King of the Saxons | Succession by other or unclear means
^{(1)} Roar
^{(1)} Sigtryg, King of the Swedes† | ^{(1)} **Skiold** ♕ | ^{(1)} Alfhild
^{(1)} daughter of Roar | ^{(1)} Bess
^{(1)} sister of Gram | ^{(1)} Gróa | ^{(1)} **Gram** ♕† | ^{(1)} Sumble, King of the Finns
^{(1)} Wagnhofde
^{(1)} Signe | ^{(1)} Henry, King of the Saxons | ^{(1)} Hakon, King of the Nitherians
^{(1)} Hardgrep
^{(1)} **Swipdag** ♕†, King of Norway | ^{(1)} sister of Guthorm | ^{(1)} **Guthorm** ♕ | ^{(1,2,5)} **Hadding** ♕ | ^{(1)} Ragnhild
^{(1)} Asmund† | ^{(1)} Gunnhild | ^{(1)} Guthorm
^{(1,2)} Ulfhild | ^{(2)} **Ubbe** ♕
^{(1)} Henry | ^{(1)} Uffe† | ^{(1,2)} Hunding† | ^{(2)} Thorhild | ^{(2)} Scot
^{(1)} daughter of Uffe | ^{(2)} Ragnar† | ^{(2)} Swanhwid | ^{(2)} sisters of Swanhwid | ^{(2)} Handwan
^{(2)} Thorwald
^{(2,5)} **Frode** ♕ | ^{(2)} daughter of Handwan
^{(2,3)} Hothbrodd† | ^{(2)} **Halfdan** ♕ | ^{(2)} Ro | ^{(2)} Skat
^{(2)} Thora
^{(2,3)} **Helge** ♕ | ^{(2)} **Ro** ♕
^{(2,3)} Athisl† | ^{(2)} Urse
^{(2,3)} King Gewar | ^{(2,3)} **Rolf** Krage ♕† | ^{(2)} Rute | ^{(2)} Bjarke | ^{(2)} Skulde | ^{(2,3)} **Hiartuar** †♕
^{(2,3)} **Hother** †♕ | ^{(3)} Nanna | ^{(3)} Herlek | ^{(3)} Gerit
^{(3)} former King of Britain | ^{(3)} mother of the King of Britain | ^{(3)} a slave | ^{(3)} a bondmaid | ^{(3)} **Rorik** Slyngebond ♕ | ^{(3)} Gerwendil
^{(3,4)} King of Britain | ^{(3,4)} Queen of Britain | ^{(3,4)} Gerutha | ^{(3,4)} Horwendil | ^{(3,4)} Feng
^{(3,4)} foster sister of Amleth | ^{(3,4)} daughter of the King of Britain | ^{(3,4)} Amleth | ^{(4)} Hermutrude, Queen of Scotland | ^{(4)} **Wiglek** ♕
^{(4)} son of Amleth | ^{(4)} **Wermund** ♕ | ^{(4)} Frowin, governor of Sleswik
^{(4)} **Uffe** ♕, aka Olaf the Gentle | ^{(4)} daughter of Frowin | ^{(4)} Ket | ^{(4)} Wig
^{(4)} **Dan** ♕
^{(4)} **Hugleik** ♕
^{(4)} **Frode** the Vigorous ♕
^{(4)} **Dan** ♕
^{(5)} Kraka | ^{(5)} Ragnar | ^{(5)} Brak | ^{(4,5)} **Fridleif** the Swift ♕ | ^{(5)} Hun, King of the Huns | ^{(5)} Hun
^{(5)} Gotar, King of Norway | ^{(5)} Westmar | ^{(5)} Koll | ^{(5)} Gotwar
^{(5)} Roller | ^{(5,6)} Erik† Shrewd-spoken | ^{(5)} Gunwar the Fair | ^{(5)} Alfhild | ^{(5,6)} **Frode** ♕ | ^{(5)} Hanund | ^{(5)} Grep (eldest of three) | ^{(5)} 11 other sons (two named Grep)
^{(6)} Hythin, King of Tellemark | ^{(5)} Alf | ^{(5)} Eyfura | ^{(5)} Arngrim | ^{(6)} Grubb | ^{(6)} **Hiarn** ♕ | ^{(6)} Amund, King of Norway
^{(6)} child of Hythin | ^{(6)} Halfdan† | ^{(5)} 12 sons, including Anganty | ^{(6)} Ane | ^{(6)} Juritha | ^{(6)} **Fridleif** ♕ | ^{(6)} Frogertha
^{(6)} Hanef, King of Saxony | ^{(6)} Swerting, King of Saxony | ^{(6)} Olaf | ^{(6)} **Frode** ♕
^{(6,7)} Siward† | ^{(6)} sons of Swerting | ^{(6)} sister of the sons of Swerting | ^{(6,7)} **Ingild** ♕ | ^{(6)} Helga | ^{(6)} Helge | ^{(6)} Asa
^{(6,7)} Frode | ^{(6,7)} Fridleif | ^{(6,7)} Ingild | ^{(6,7)} **Olaf** ♕ | ^{(7)} Karl, governor of Gothland
^{(7)} Ulfhild | ^{(7)} **Frode** ♕ | ^{(7)} Hather, a chief | ^{(7)} **Harald** ♕ | ^{(7)} Signe
^{(7)} Erik† | ^{(7)} Thorhild | ^{(7)} **Halfdan** Biargramm ♕† | ^{(7)} Harald
^{(7)} Asmund
Kings of Norway

Name spellings are derived from Oliver Elton's 1905 translation, The First Nine Books of the Danish History of Saxo Grammaticus, via Wikisource.

== Codex Runicus ==
Hading is mentioned in the Runekrønike (runic chronicle) section of the Codex Runicus. The Runekrønike is a fragment that begins partway through a line, and Hading (ᚼᛆᛑᛁᚿᚵ) is given as the father of King Froþe (ᚠᚱᚮᚦᛅ), who is mentioned on the first full line. If the partial first line refers to Hading, then he is noted as having won a place called Dynuborg for tribute or tax, and having accomplished a feat (cut off by the fragment of the manuscript) at the Hellespont.

== See also ==
- Haddingjar

== Notes ==
Legendary titles
| Preceded by Svipdagr | King of Denmark | Succeeded by Frotho I |
