= Gríðr =

Character in Norse mythology and legendary Danish queen

Gríðr (Old Norse: [ˈɡriːðz̠]) often anglicized as Gríd, is a jötunn in Norse mythology. She is the mother of Víðarr the Silent and the consort of Óðinn. Saturn's moon Gridr was named after her.

== Name ==
The poetic Old Norse name Gríðr has been translated as "vehemence, violence, or impetuosity". Its etymology is unclear.

== Attestations ==
=== Prose Edda ===
In Skáldskaparmál (The Language of Poetry), Gríðr is portrayed as equipping the thunder god Thor with her belt of strength, her iron glove, and her staff Gríðarvöl (Gríðr's-staff) on Thor's journey to the abode of Geirröðr.

Thor lodged for the night with a giantess called Grid. She was Víðarr the silent's mother. She told Thor the truth about Geirrod, that he was a cunning giant and awkward to deal with. She lent him a girdle of might and some iron gauntlets of hers, and her staff, called Grid's pole.

— Snorri Sturluson, Skáldskaparmál, 18, trans. A. Faulkes, 1987.

Gríðr is also mentioned in a list of troll-wives ("I shall list the names of troll-wives. Grid and Gnissa, Gryla...").

=== Skaldic poetry ===
Gríðarvöl (Gríðr's staff) is also mentioned in the poem Þórsdrápa by the late-10th-century skald Eilífr Goðrúnarson.

The feller of the dolphins of the steeps [giants] advanced with violent temper with Grid's pole.

— Eilífr Goðrúnarson, Þórsdrápa, trans. A. Faulkes, 1987.

Gríðr appears in 10th-century kennings for 'wolf' (the steed of troll-wife) and for 'axe' (that which is dangerous to the life-protector, i.e. shield or helmet).

Battle raged when the feeder of Grid's steed [wolf], he who waged war, advanced with ringing Gaut's [Odin's] fire. Weird rose from the well.

— Kormákr Ögmundarson, Skáldskaparmál 49, trans. A. Faulkes, 1987.

Riders [seafarers] of Ræfil's land's [sea's] horses [ships] can see how beautifully engraved dragons lie just by the brow of the Grid of the life-protector.

— Einarr Skúlason, Skáldskaparmál 49, trans. A. Faulkes, 1987.

=== Other texts ===
Saxo Grammaticus refers to her as Grytha, the wife of the legendary king Dan I of Denmark, "a lady whom the Teutons accorded the highest honour". A witch of the same name appears in Illuga saga Gríðarfóstra.

The family tree of legendary Kings of the Danes, according to the Gesta Danorum (Books I to VII)

Kings of the Danes are in bold and marked with a crown (♕). Kings of the Swedes are marked with a dagger (†). Superscript numbers before a name indicate in which books of Gesta Danorum the individual is mentioned.

^{(1)} Humble
KEY
^{(1)} Angul	^{(1)} **Dan** ♕	^{(1)} Grytha	Marriage or coupling
Parent and child
The Angles	^{(1)} **Humble** ♕	^{(1)} **Lother** ♕	^{(1)} King of the Saxons	Succession by other or unclear means
^{(1)} Roar
^{(1)} Sigtryg, King of the Swedes†	^{(1)} **Skiold** ♕	^{(1)} Alfhild
^{(1)} daughter of Roar	^{(1)} Bess
^{(1)} sister of Gram	^{(1)} Gróa	^{(1)} **Gram** ♕†	^{(1)} Sumble, King of the Finns
^{(1)} Wagnhofde
^{(1)} Signe	^{(1)} Henry, King of the Saxons	^{(1)} Hakon, King of the Nitherians
^{(1)} Hardgrep
^{(1)} **Swipdag** ♕†, King of Norway	^{(1)} sister of Guthorm	^{(1)} **Guthorm** ♕	^{(1,2,5)} **Hadding** ♕	^{(1)} Ragnhild
^{(1)} Asmund†	^{(1)} Gunnhild	^{(1)} Guthorm
^{(1,2)} Ulfhild	^{(2)} **Ubbe** ♕
^{(1)} Henry	^{(1)} Uffe†	^{(1,2)} Hunding†	^{(2)} Thorhild	^{(2)} Scot
^{(1)} daughter of Uffe	^{(2)} Ragnar†	^{(2)} Swanhwid	^{(2)} sisters of Swanhwid	^{(2)} Handwan
^{(2)} Thorwald
^{(2,5)} **Frode** ♕	^{(2)} daughter of Handwan
^{(2,3)} Hothbrodd†	^{(2)} **Halfdan** ♕	^{(2)} Ro	^{(2)} Skat
^{(2)} Thora
^{(2,3)} **Helge** ♕	^{(2)} **Ro** ♕
^{(2,3)} Athisl†	^{(2)} Urse
^{(2,3)} King Gewar	^{(2,3)} **Rolf** Krage ♕†	^{(2)} Rute	^{(2)} Bjarke	^{(2)} Skulde	^{(2,3)} **Hiartuar** †♕
^{(2,3)} **Hother** †♕	^{(3)} Nanna	^{(3)} Herlek	^{(3)} Gerit
^{(3)} former King of Britain	^{(3)} mother of the King of Britain	^{(3)} a slave	^{(3)} a bondmaid	^{(3)} **Rorik** Slyngebond ♕	^{(3)} Gerwendil
^{(3,4)} King of Britain	^{(3,4)} Queen of Britain	^{(3,4)} Gerutha	^{(3,4)} Horwendil	^{(3,4)} Feng
^{(3,4)} foster sister of Amleth	^{(3,4)} daughter of the King of Britain	^{(3,4)} Amleth	^{(4)} Hermutrude, Queen of Scotland	^{(4)} **Wiglek** ♕
^{(4)} son of Amleth	^{(4)} **Wermund** ♕	^{(4)} Frowin, governor of Sleswik
^{(4)} **Uffe** ♕, aka Olaf the Gentle	^{(4)} daughter of Frowin	^{(4)} Ket	^{(4)} Wig
^{(4)} **Dan** ♕
^{(4)} **Hugleik** ♕
^{(4)} **Frode** the Vigorous ♕
^{(4)} **Dan** ♕
^{(5)} Kraka	^{(5)} Ragnar	^{(5)} Brak	^{(4,5)} **Fridleif** the Swift ♕	^{(5)} Hun, King of the Huns	^{(5)} Hun
^{(5)} Gotar, King of Norway	^{(5)} Westmar	^{(5)} Koll	^{(5)} Gotwar
^{(5)} Roller	^{(5,6)} Erik† Shrewd-spoken	^{(5)} Gunwar the Fair	^{(5)} Alfhild	^{(5,6)} **Frode** ♕	^{(5)} Hanund	^{(5)} Grep (eldest of three)	^{(5)} 11 other sons (two named Grep)
^{(6)} Hythin, King of Tellemark	^{(5)} Alf	^{(5)} Eyfura	^{(5)} Arngrim	^{(6)} Grubb	^{(6)} **Hiarn** ♕	^{(6)} Amund, King of Norway
^{(6)} child of Hythin	^{(6)} Halfdan†	^{(5)} 12 sons, including Anganty	^{(6)} Ane	^{(6)} Juritha	^{(6)} **Fridleif** ♕	^{(6)} Frogertha
^{(6)} Hanef, King of Saxony	^{(6)} Swerting, King of Saxony	^{(6)} Olaf	^{(6)} **Frode** ♕
^{(6,7)} Siward†	^{(6)} sons of Swerting	^{(6)} sister of the sons of Swerting	^{(6,7)} **Ingild** ♕	^{(6)} Helga	^{(6)} Helge	^{(6)} Asa
^{(6,7)} Frode	^{(6,7)} Fridleif	^{(6,7)} Ingild	^{(6,7)} **Olaf** ♕	^{(7)} Karl, governor of Gothland
^{(7)} Ulfhild	^{(7)} **Frode** ♕	^{(7)} Hather, a chief	^{(7)} **Harald** ♕	^{(7)} Signe
^{(7)} Erik†	^{(7)} Thorhild	^{(7)} **Halfdan** Biargramm ♕†	^{(7)} Harald
^{(7)} Asmund
Kings of Norway

Name spellings are derived from Oliver Elton's 1905 translation, The First Nine Books of the Danish History of Saxo Grammaticus, via Wikisource.

== Theory ==
Her role as the donor of information and necessary items to the hero has been analyzed by folklorists as a commonplace of folk narrative.
