= Gridr (moon) =

Moon of Saturn

Discovery
- Discovered by: Sheppard et al.
- Discovery date: 2019

Designations
- Pronunciation: /ˈɡriːðər/
- Named after: Gríðr
- Alternative names: Saturn LIV; S/2004 S 20; S2423b

Orbital characteristics
- Semi-major axis: 19211000 km
- Eccentricity: 0.204
- Orbital period (sidereal): −990.23 days
- Inclination: 163.1°
- Satellite of: Saturn
- Group: Norse group

Physical characteristics
- Mean diameter: 4 km
- Apparent magnitude: 25.0

Gridr (Saturn LIV), originally known as S/2004 S 20, is a natural satellite of Saturn. Its discovery was announced by Scott S. Sheppard, David C. Jewitt, and Jan Kleyna on October 7, 2019 from observations taken between December 12, 2004 and March 22, 2007. It was given its permanent designation in June 2021. On 24 August 2022, it was officially named after Gríðr, a jötunn in Norse mythology. She is the mother of Víðarr the silent and the consort of Odin. She warned Thor about the treachery of Geirröðr and equipped him with her belt of strength, her iron glove, and her staff Gríðarvöl (Gríðr's-staff).

Gridr is about 4 kilometres in diameter, and orbits Saturn at an average distance of 19.418 million km in 1010.55 days, at an inclination of 163° to the ecliptic, in a retrograde direction and with an eccentricity of 0.197.
