= Hamlet's Grave =

Two burial sites in Denmark

There are two sites in Denmark presented as Hamlet's Grave (Hamlets Grav), the burial site of Amleth (Amlethus, Amlodi, Amblett), the Jutish chieftain of historical legend on whom Hamlet, the hero of Shakespeare's tragedy was based; one is in the grounds of Marienlyst Castle in Helsingør, the other is a Bronze Age tumulus in Ammelhede, Randers Municipality, Jutland.

== Marienlyst ==
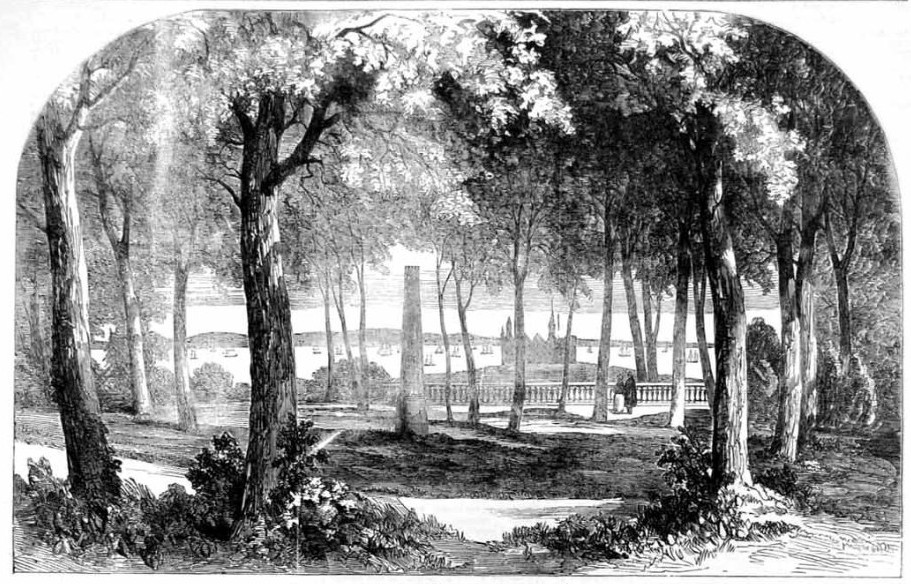
View of "Hamlet's Grave" published in The Illustrated London News in 1856.

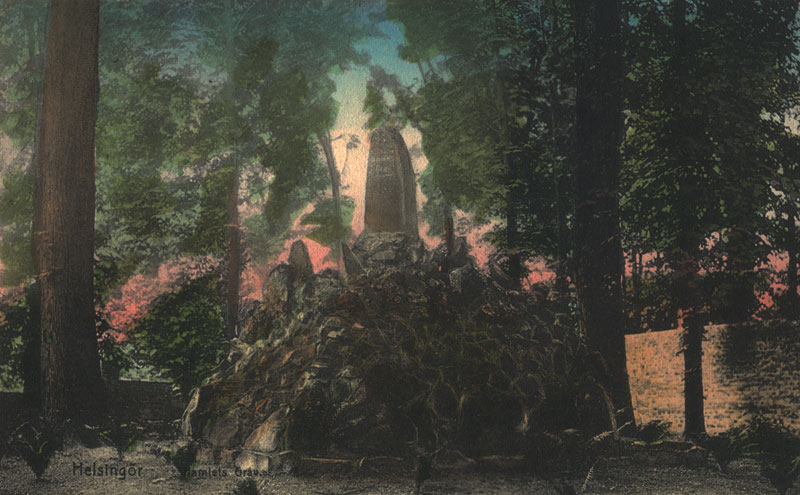
Postcard showing a hand-coloured photograph of the memorial as it stood between 1879 and 1926.

In Helsingør, tradition since at least the late 18th century located "Hamlet's grave" just north of what is now Højstrup halt. Touristic interest in visiting Hamlet's Grave arose in the 1850s. By that time, a stone obelisk marked Hamlet's Grave in the park of Marienlyst Castle (56.0423°N 12.6005°E), on an old fortification on the crest of a hill.

According to Jacob Riis, there were two stone obelisks erected (subsequently) at the spot, which were both eventually carried away by relic-seekers. Therefore, in 1879, J.S. Nathanson, who rented Marienlyst castle and operated a luxury hotel there from 1859 to 1896, marked Hamlet's grave with a large heap of stones. He would re-supply the stones regularly as they were carried away as relics by tourists. Nathanson's display of Hamlet's grave for the benefit of "the credulous and sentimental" and the aggressive use of the name of Hamlet in the advertisement of Hotel Marienlyst was much criticized at the time.

A granite stone shaped like a sarcophagus was erected on the site in 1926, on the occasion of Helsingør's 500-years anniversary. The relief on the stone was designed by Einar Utzon-Frank. At this point, no pretence was made to the effect that the site was in any way the historical burial-place of Hamlet. Postcards of the period identify the monument as Hamlets mindesten ("Hamlet's memorial stone"). At a later time, a bronze plaque was added to the stone reading

Einar Utzon-Frank, Hamlets Mindegrav, på Sarkofagen Symboler for mandlig Styrke og Jomfruelighed, 1926
"Einar Utzon-Frank, Hamlet's memorial grave, on the sarcophagus symbols of virile strength and of virginity, 1926"

This refers to the design of Utzon-Frank's relief, showing a lion-like creature on one side (for Hamlet) and a unicorn on the other (for Ophelia).

== Ammelhede ==
On 27 April 1932, O. Løye, pharmacist at the Løveapoteket drug store in Randers, Jutland, published an article in the local newspaper in which he claimed to be able to prove that a local burial mound known as Kongshøj ('king's howe'; 56.434°N 10.221°E) was the tomb of Hamlet. The mound in question is situated in Ammelhede, the name of a pasture and farmstead in Essenbæk Sogn (formerly Sønderhald Municipality, since 2007 part of Randers Municipality). Løye interpreted the toponym as Amleds hede 'Amleth's heath'. In the account of Saxo Grammaticus, Amlethus dies in battle against Wiglek and is indeed buried on a plain in Jutland, which was afterwards named after him.

Løye's article triggered a lively debate, including scathing criticism published in Fyns Venstreblad. On 30 April, Politiken published a sarcastic article which made the tongue-in-cheek suggestion that the people of Randers were free to exploit the theory and erect a stone to Hamlet on the mound in an attempt to draw away tourism from the much-criticized "fraudulent" monument in Marienlyst park.

The following year, on 3 September 1933, such a stone was indeed raised on the mound by the recently founded Randers tourist board (Turistforeningen), citing the support of Jørgen Olrik, curator of the Danish folklore museum, and Hans Ellekilde, archivist of the Danish folklore collection. The stone is inscribed with an alliterating poem:

Amled Ypperste / Oldtids-snille
Teed sig taabe / Til hævnens time
Kaaret på ting / Af Jyder til konge
Højsat han hviler / Paa Amled Hede

"Amled, the chieftain, craftiest of old,"
"made himself a fool until the time of vengeance,"
"Chosen as king at the thing of the Jutes,"
"High-seated he rests on Amled's heath."

Excavations in 1950 established that the burial mound in fact dates to the Bronze Age.

== See also ==
- List of tombs and mausoleums
