= Hermuthruda =

Hermuthruda, Hermutrude (Old English: Eormenthryth) was a figure in Scandinavian romance.

The chief authority for the legend of Hermuthruda is the Danish chronicle Gesta Danorum by Saxo Grammaticus. Described as "the wild queen of Scotland", she became the wife of Wihtlaeg or Vigletus and is described as a Wicked Queen type of character such as found in a variety of fiction.

In the chronicle, Amlethus is sent to court Hermuthruda by the King of England. However the queen had a reputation for killing all suitors, Saxo saying "in the cruelty of her arrogance she had always loathed her wooers, and inflicted upon them the supreme punishment, so that out of many there was not one but paid for his boldness with his head". Hermuthruda takes a liking to Amlethus after stealing his shield and learning of his past. The couple are married until a battle with Wihtlaeg, before which Hermuthruda promises Amlethus her undying love for him, and that she will never marry another. After Wihtlaeg is victorious, Hermuthruda switches sides and immediately marries him in a display of inconsistency that leads to her becoming the "ancestress of Offa".

The family tree of legendary Kings of the Danes, according to the Gesta Danorum (Books I to VII)

Kings of the Danes are in bold and marked with an asterisk (*). Kings of the Swedes are marked with a dagger (†). Superscript numbers before a name indicate in which books of Gesta Danorum the individual is mentioned.

^{(1)} Humble
KEY
^{(1)} Angul	^{(1)} **Dan***	^{(1)} Grytha	Marriage or coupling
Parent and child
The Angles	^{(1)} **Humble***	^{(1)} **Lother***	^{(1)} King of the Saxons	Succession by other or unclear means
^{(1)} Roar
^{(1)} Sigtryg, King of the Swedes†	^{(1)} **Skiold***	^{(1)} Alfhild
^{(1)} daughter of Roar	^{(1)} Bess
^{(1)} sister of Gram	^{(1)} Gróa	^{(1)} **Gram***†	^{(1)} Sumble, King of the Finns
^{(1)} Wagnhofde
^{(1)} Signe	^{(1)} Henry, King of the Saxons	^{(1)} Hakon, King of the Nitherians
^{(1)} Hardgrep
^{(1)} **Swipdag***†, King of Norway	^{(1)} sister of Guthorm	^{(1)} **Guthorm***	^{(1,2,5)} **Hadding***	^{(1)} Ragnhild
^{(1)} Asmund†	^{(1)} Gunnhild	^{(1)} Guthorm
^{(1,2)} Ulfhild	^{(2)} **Ubbe***
^{(1)} Henry	^{(1)} Uffe†	^{(1,2)} Hunding†	^{(2)} Thorhild	^{(2)} Scot
^{(1)} daughter of Uffe	^{(2)} Ragnar†	^{(2)} Swanhwid	^{(2)} sisters of Swanhwid	^{(2)} Handwan
^{(2)} Thorwald
^{(2,5)} **Frode***	^{(2)} daughter of Handwan
^{(2,3)} Hothbrodd†	^{(2)} **Halfdan***	^{(2)} Ro	^{(2)} Skat
^{(2)} Thora
^{(2,3)} **Helge***	^{(2)} **Ro***
^{(2,3)} Athisl†	^{(2)} Urse
^{(2,3)} King Gewar	^{(2,3)} **Rolf***† Krage	^{(2)} Rute	^{(2)} Bjarke	^{(2)} Skulde	^{(2,3)} **Hiartuar**†*
^{(2,3)} **Hother**†*	^{(3)} Nanna	^{(3)} Herlek	^{(3)} Gerit
^{(3)} former King of Britain	^{(3)} mother of the King of Britain	^{(3)} a slave	^{(3)} a bondmaid	^{(3)} **Rorik***	^{(3)} Gerwendil
^{(3,4)} King of Britain	^{(3,4)} Queen of Britain	^{(3,4)} Gerutha	^{(3,4)} Horwendil	^{(3,4)} Feng
^{(3,4)} foster sister of Amleth	^{(3,4)} daughter of the King of Britain	^{(3,4)} Amleth	^{(4)} Hermutrude, Queen of Scotland	^{(4)} **Wiglek***
^{(4)} son of Amleth	^{(4)} **Wermund***	^{(4)} Frowin, governor of Sleswik
^{(4)} **Uffe***, aka Olaf the Gentle	^{(4)} daughter of Frowin	^{(4)} Ket	^{(4)} Wig
^{(4)} **Dan***
^{(4)} **Hugleik***
^{(4)} **Frode*** the Vigorous
^{(4)} **Dan***
^{(5)} Kraka	^{(5)} Ragnar	^{(5)} Brak	^{(4,5)} **Fridleif*** the Swift	^{(5)} Hun, King of the Huns	^{(5)} Hun
^{(5)} Gotar, King of Norway	^{(5)} Westmar	^{(5)} Koll	^{(5)} Gotwar
^{(5)} Roller	^{(5,6)} Erik† Shrewd-spoken	^{(5)} Gunwar the Fair	^{(5)} Alfhild	^{(5,6)} **Frode***	^{(5)} Hanund	^{(5)} Grep (eldest of three)	^{(5)} 11 other sons (two named Grep)
^{(6)} Hythin, King of Tellemark	^{(5)} Alf	^{(5)} Eyfura	^{(5)} Arngrim	^{(6)} Grubb	^{(6)} **Hiarn***	^{(6)} Amund, King of Norway
^{(6)} child of Hythin	^{(6)} Halfdan†	^{(5)} 12 sons, including Anganty	^{(6)} Ane	^{(6)} Juritha	^{(6)} **Fridleif***	^{(6)} Frogertha
^{(6)} Hanef, King of Saxony	^{(6)} Swerting, King of Saxony	^{(6)} Olaf	^{(6)} **Frode***
^{(6,7)} Siward†	^{(6)} sons of Swerting	^{(6)} sister of the sons of Swerting	^{(6,7)} **Ingild***	^{(6)} Helga	^{(6)} Helge	^{(6)} Asa
^{(6,7)} Frode	^{(6,7)} Fridleif	^{(6,7)} Ingild	^{(6,7)} **Olaf***	^{(7)} Karl, governor of Gothland
^{(7)} Ulfhild	^{(7)} **Frode***	^{(7)} Hather, a chief	^{(7)} **Harald***	^{(7)} Signe
^{(7)} Erik†	^{(7)} Thorhild	^{(7)} **Halfdan***† Biargramm	^{(7)} Harald
^{(7)} Asmund
Kings of Norway

Name spellings are derived from Oliver Elton's 1905 translation, The First Nine Books of the Danish History of Saxo Grammaticus, via Wikisource.

== See also ==
- Queen of Elphame
