= Fridlevus II =

Fridleif, Fridlevus or Fritleff is a legendary king of the Danes.

== Ynglinga saga ==
According to Ynglinga saga, he was a son of Fróði of the Skjöldung (Scylding) lineage. In that work he was the brother of Halfdan and the father of Áli the Strong.

== Gesta Danorum ==
Fridleif is also mentioned in Book VI of Gesta Danorum by Saxo Grammaticus. In this, he was also a son of Frode and was being reared in Russia at the time of Frode's death. The Danes believed that Fridleif had also perished, and therefore gave the crown instead to a poet named Hiarn. Fridleif was called to the aid of his kinsman Halfdan, governor of Sweden after his father Erik, to help defeat 12 Norwegian brothers who were attacking his country. Fridleif killed 11 of the brothers, but subsequently recruited the strongest of the brothers, Biorn. During this adventure, he learned of his father's passing and then returned to Denmark, revealing to the people that he had not died as previously believed. Hiarn refused to yield the throne, leading to civil war. Hiarn disguised himself to infiltrate Fridleif's court and kill him, but was discovered. Fridleif defeated Hiarn in single combat and became king of Denmark.

The family tree of legendary Kings of the Danes, according to the Gesta Danorum (Books I to VII)

Kings of the Danes are in bold and marked with a crown (♕). Kings of the Swedes are marked with a dagger (†). Superscript numbers before a name indicate in which books of Gesta Danorum the individual is mentioned.

^{(1)} Humble
KEY
^{(1)} Angul | ^{(1)} **Dan** ♕ | ^{(1)} Grytha | Marriage or coupling
Parent and child
The Angles | ^{(1)} **Humble** ♕ | ^{(1)} **Lother** ♕ | ^{(1)} King of the Saxons | Succession by other or unclear means
^{(1)} Roar
^{(1)} Sigtryg, King of the Swedes† | ^{(1)} **Skiold** ♕ | ^{(1)} Alfhild
^{(1)} daughter of Roar | ^{(1)} Bess
^{(1)} sister of Gram | ^{(1)} Gróa | ^{(1)} **Gram** ♕† | ^{(1)} Sumble, King of the Finns
^{(1)} Wagnhofde
^{(1)} Signe | ^{(1)} Henry, King of the Saxons | ^{(1)} Hakon, King of the Nitherians
^{(1)} Hardgrep
^{(1)} **Swipdag** ♕†, King of Norway | ^{(1)} sister of Guthorm | ^{(1)} **Guthorm** ♕ | ^{(1,2,5)} **Hadding** ♕ | ^{(1)} Ragnhild
^{(1)} Asmund† | ^{(1)} Gunnhild | ^{(1)} Guthorm
^{(1,2)} Ulfhild | ^{(2)} **Ubbe** ♕
^{(1)} Henry | ^{(1)} Uffe† | ^{(1,2)} Hunding† | ^{(2)} Thorhild | ^{(2)} Scot
^{(1)} daughter of Uffe | ^{(2)} Ragnar† | ^{(2)} Swanhwid | ^{(2)} sisters of Swanhwid | ^{(2)} Handwan
^{(2)} Thorwald
^{(2,5)} **Frode** ♕ | ^{(2)} daughter of Handwan
^{(2,3)} Hothbrodd† | ^{(2)} **Halfdan** ♕ | ^{(2)} Ro | ^{(2)} Skat
^{(2)} Thora
^{(2,3)} **Helge** ♕ | ^{(2)} **Ro** ♕
^{(2,3)} Athisl† | ^{(2)} Urse
^{(2,3)} King Gewar | ^{(2,3)} **Rolf** Krage ♕† | ^{(2)} Rute | ^{(2)} Bjarke | ^{(2)} Skulde | ^{(2,3)} **Hiartuar** †♕
^{(2,3)} **Hother** †♕ | ^{(3)} Nanna | ^{(3)} Herlek | ^{(3)} Gerit
^{(3)} former King of Britain | ^{(3)} mother of the King of Britain | ^{(3)} a slave | ^{(3)} a bondmaid | ^{(3)} **Rorik** ♕ | ^{(3)} Gerwendil
^{(3,4)} King of Britain | ^{(3,4)} Queen of Britain | ^{(3,4)} Gerutha | ^{(3,4)} Horwendil | ^{(3,4)} Feng
^{(3,4)} foster sister of Amleth | ^{(3,4)} daughter of the King of Britain | ^{(3,4)} Amleth | ^{(4)} Hermutrude, Queen of Scotland | ^{(4)} **Wiglek** ♕
^{(4)} son of Amleth | ^{(4)} **Wermund** ♕ | ^{(4)} Frowin, governor of Sleswik
^{(4)} **Uffe** ♕, aka Olaf the Gentle | ^{(4)} daughter of Frowin | ^{(4)} Ket | ^{(4)} Wig
^{(4)} **Dan** ♕
^{(4)} **Hugleik** ♕
^{(4)} **Frode** the Vigorous ♕
^{(4)} **Dan** ♕
^{(5)} Kraka | ^{(5)} Ragnar | ^{(5)} Brak | ^{(4,5)} **Fridleif** the Swift ♕ | ^{(5)} Hun, King of the Huns | ^{(5)} Hun
^{(5)} Gotar, King of Norway | ^{(5)} Westmar | ^{(5)} Koll | ^{(5)} Gotwar
^{(5)} Roller | ^{(5,6)} Erik† Shrewd-spoken | ^{(5)} Gunwar the Fair | ^{(5)} Alfhild | ^{(5,6)} **Frode** ♕ | ^{(5)} Hanund | ^{(5)} Grep (eldest of three) | ^{(5)} 11 other sons (two named Grep)
^{(6)} Hythin, King of Tellemark | ^{(5)} Alf | ^{(5)} Eyfura | ^{(5)} Arngrim | ^{(6)} Grubb | ^{(6)} **Hiarn** ♕ | ^{(6)} Amund, King of Norway
^{(6)} child of Hythin | ^{(6)} Halfdan† | ^{(5)} 12 sons, including Anganty | ^{(6)} Ane | ^{(6)} Juritha | ^{(6)} **Fridleif** ♕ | ^{(6)} Frogertha
^{(6)} Hanef, King of Saxony | ^{(6)} Swerting, King of Saxony | ^{(6)} Olaf | ^{(6)} **Frode** ♕
^{(6,7)} Siward† | ^{(6)} sons of Swerting | ^{(6)} sister of the sons of Swerting | ^{(6,7)} **Ingild** ♕ | ^{(6)} Helga | ^{(6)} Helge | ^{(6)} Asa
^{(6,7)} Frode | ^{(6,7)} Fridleif | ^{(6,7)} Ingild | ^{(6,7)} **Olaf** ♕ | ^{(7)} Karl, governor of Gothland
^{(7)} Ulfhild | ^{(7)} **Frode** ♕ | ^{(7)} Hather, a chief | ^{(7)} **Harald** ♕ | ^{(7)} Signe
^{(7)} Erik† | ^{(7)} Thorhild | ^{(7)} **Halfdan** Biargramm ♕† | ^{(7)} Harald
^{(7)} Asmund
Kings of Norway

Name spellings are derived from Oliver Elton's 1905 translation, The First Nine Books of the Danish History of Saxo Grammaticus, via Wikisource.

== Chronicon Lethrense ==
In the Chronicon Lethrense, Fritleff came from the northern regions during the reign of Aki, married the daughter of Rolf Kraki, and had a son by her named Frothi. He then killed King Aki and became king in his place. When he died, he was succeeded by Frothi, who was nicknamed Largus (possibly meaning "the Generous" or "the Tall").

The family tree of legendary Kings of the Danes, according to Chronicon Lethrense

Kings of the Danes are in bold and marked with a crown (♕).

Ypper, King of Uppsala ♂
KEY
Nori ♂ | Østen ♂ | ♕ **Dan** ♂ | Dannia ♀ | Marriage or coupling
Parent and child
Rolfcarl, aka Rolf, a baron ♂ | ♕ **Ro** ♂ | Ro's wife ♀ | Succession by other means
Thora ♀
♕ **Helgi** ♂ | ♕ **Haldan** ♂
Athisl, King of Swethia ♂ | Ursula ♀ | ♕ **Raka**, a dog ♂
Siward Albus ♂ | ♕ **Snyo** ♂
♕ **Hiarwart** ♂ | Sculd ♀ | ♕ **Rolf** Kraki ♂
Hamund ♂
♕ **Aki** ♂ | Haghbard ♂ | daughter of Rolf Kraki ♀ | ♕ **Fritleff** ♂
♕ **Frothi** Largus ♂
♕ **Ingyald** ♂
♕ **Olav** ♂
♕ **Asa** ♀
♕ **Harald** Hildetan (war-tooth) ♂
♕ **Hethae** ♀

The source used for the genealogical information and name spellings is the English translation provided by Mischa Hooker of Augustana College.

== Sources ==
Legendary titles
| Preceded by Hiarn | King of Denmark (according to Gesta Danorum) | Succeeded by Frotho IV |

Legendary titles
| Preceded by Aki | King of Denmark (according to Chronicon Lethrense) | Succeeded by Frothi Largus |
