= Amleth =

Figure in medieval Scandinavian romance

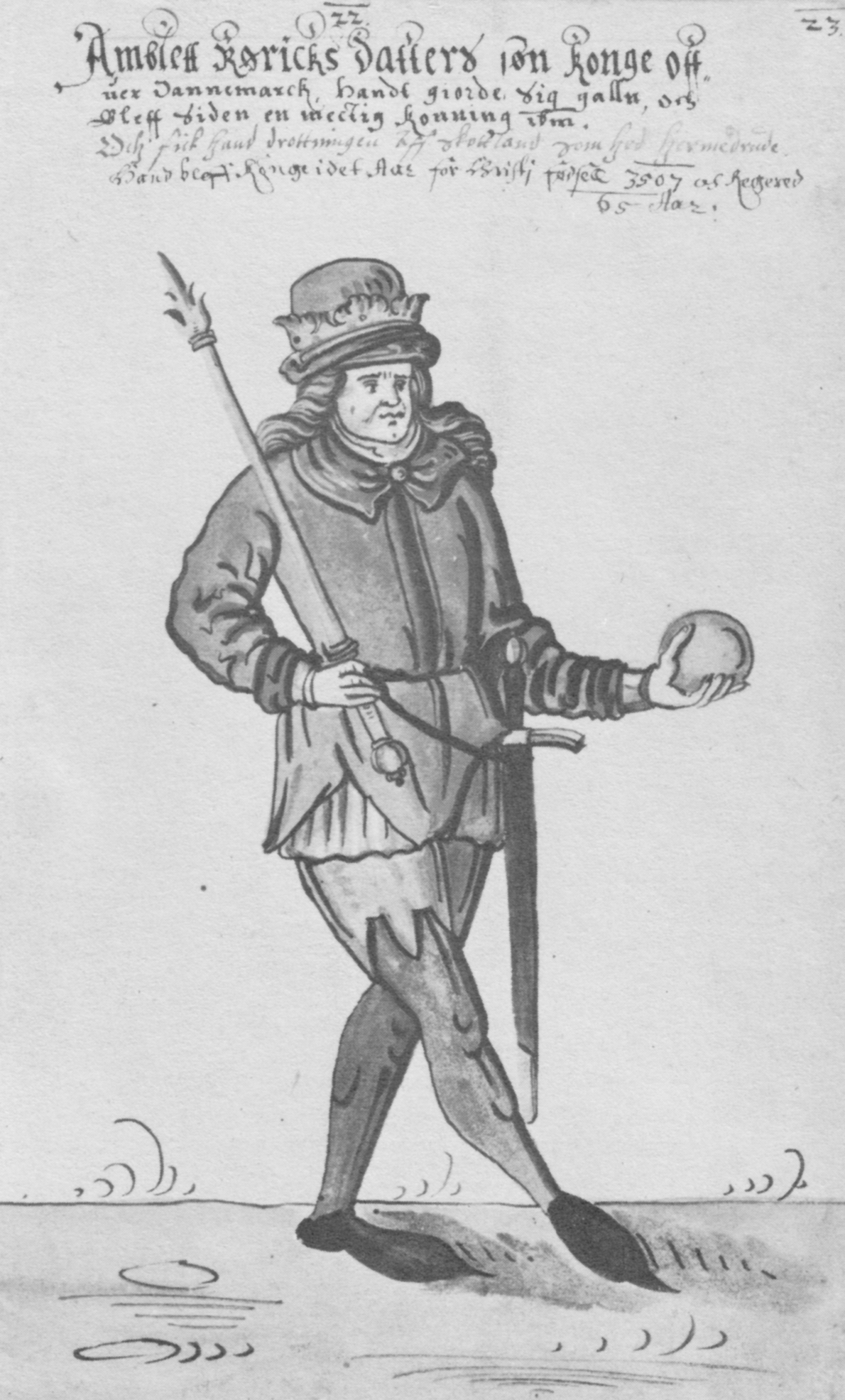
Amblett in a 17th-century Danish manuscript illustration

Amleth (Old Norse: Amlóði; Latinized as Amlethus) is a figure in a medieval Scandinavian legend.

He is the direct inspiration of the character of Prince Hamlet, the hero of William Shakespeare's tragedy The Tragedy of Hamlet, Prince of Denmark.

The chief authority for the legend of Amleth is Saxo Grammaticus, who devotes to it parts of the third and fourth books of his Gesta Danorum, completed at the beginning of the 13th century. Saxo's version is supplemented by Latin and vernacular compilations from a much later date. In all versions, prince Amleth (Amblothæ) is the son of Horvendill (Orwendel), king of the Jutes. It has often been assumed that the story is ultimately derived from an Old Icelandic poem, but no such poem has been found; the extant Icelandic versions, known as the Ambales-saga or Amloda-saga, are considerably later than Saxo.

Amleth's name is not mentioned in Old-Icelandic regnal lists before Saxo. Only the 15th-century Sagnkrønike from Stockholm may contain some older elements.

== Name ==
The Old Icelandic form Amlóði is recorded twice in Snorri Sturluson's Prose Edda. According to the section Skaldskaparmal, the expression Amlóða mólu ('Amlóði's quern-stone') is a kenning for the sea, which similarly grinds the skerries to sand. In a poem by the 10th-century skald Snæbjörn the name of the legendary hero Amlóði is intrinsically connected to the word líðmeldr ('ale-flower'), leading to the conclusion that the nine mermaids, who operated the "hand-mill of the sea", "long ago ground the ale-flour of Amlóði". The association with flour milling and beer brewing, the gold carried around, the net used to catch people and the association with the nine female waves place Amleth on a par with the deity Aegir and his wife Rán.

The late 12th-century Amlethus, Amblothæ may easily be latinizations of the Old Norse name. The etymology of the name is unknown, but there are various suggestions.

Icelandic Amlóði is recorded as a term for a fool or simpleton in reference to the simulated madness of the legendary Danish prince. One suggestion is based on the "fool" or "trickster" interpretation of the name, composing the name from Old Norse ama "to vex, annoy, molest" and óðr "fierceness, madness" (also in the theonym Odin). The Irish and Scottish word amhlair, which in contemporary vernacular denotes a dull, stupid person, is handed down from the ancient name for a court jester or fool, who entertained the king but also surreptitiously advised him through riddles and antics.

A more recent suggestion is based on the Eddaic kenning associating Amlóði with the mythological mill grótti, and derives it from the Old Irish name Admlithi "great-grinding", attested in Togail Bruidne Dá Derga.

Attention has also been drawn to the similarity of Amleth to the Irish name Amhladh (variously Amhlaidh, Amhlaigh, Amhlaide), itself a Gaelic adaptation of the Norse name Olaf.

In a controversial suggestion going back to 1937, the sequence æmluþ contained in the 8th-century Old Frisian runic inscription on the Westeremden yew-stick has been interpreted as a reference to "Amleth". Contemporary runic research does not support this conclusion.

== Scandinavian legend ==
It has frequently been assumed that the Scandinavian legend ultimately goes back to an Old Norse (Old Icelandic) poem of about the 10th century. Nevertheless, no such poem has survived, and the late 12th-century Latin version of the story told by Saxo Grammaticus is the oldest source. There are, however, striking parallels with Gaimar's 12th-century Anglo-Norman Lay of Haveloc and the subsequent English romance of Havelok the Dane. Like the story of Amleth, that of Haveloc is set in Jutland in a more or less maritime context. Both protagonists fake madness. Still, Haveloc has special abilities that we do not find in Amleth, such as a fire coming from his mouth during sleep, an oversized stature, a birth-mark indicating his royal descent and the ability to blow a miraculous horn. Comparable motifs emerge in the romance of Bevis of Hampton. Saxo Grammaticus must also have been inspired by the classical story of Brutus (see below).

There was in addition an early modern (17th century) Icelandic version of the tale. Historian Thormodus Torfæus had asserted that a story of Amlodi was part of popular folklore in the mid-17th century, but it is unclear whether the early modern Icelandic tale is substantially influenced by Saxo's account, or if it represents an independent tradition derived from the unattested Old Icelandic source.

=== Saxo's version ===
Gervendill, governor of Jutland, was succeeded by his sons Horvendill and Feng. Horvendill, on his return from a Viking expedition in which he had slain Koll, king of Norway, married Gerutha, daughter of Rørik Slyngebond, king of Denmark; they had a son, Amleth. However, Feng murdered Horvendill out of jealousy and persuaded Gerutha to become his wife on the plea that he had committed the crime for no other reason than to avenge her of a husband who had hated her. Amleth, afraid of sharing his father's fate, pretended to be an imbecile. However, Feng's suspicions put him to various tests related in detail. Among other things, they sought to entangle him with a young girl, his foster-sister (the prototype of Ophelia), but his cunning saved him. However, when Amleth slew the eavesdropper hidden, like Polonius in Shakespeare's play, in his mother's room, and destroyed all trace of the deed, Feng was assured that the young man's madness was feigned. Accordingly, he dispatched him to Britain in company with two attendants, who bore a letter urging the country's king to put him to death. Amleth surmised the purport of their instructions and secretly altered the message on their wooden tablets to instead direct the king to kill the attendants and give Amleth his daughter in marriage.

After marrying the princess, Amleth returned to Denmark at the end of a year. Of the wealth he had accumulated, he took with him only certain hollow sticks filled with gold. He arrived in time for a funeral feast to celebrate his supposed death. During the feast, he plied the courtiers with wine. He executed his vengeance during their drunken sleep by fastening down over them the woolen hangings of the hall with pegs he had sharpened during his feigned madness, then setting fire to the palace. He slew Feng with his own sword. After a long harangue to the people, he was proclaimed king. Returning to Britain for his wife, he found that his father-in-law and Feng had pledged each to avenge the other's death. The English king, unwilling to personally carry out his pledge, sent Amleth as proxy wooer for the hand of a terrible Scottish queen, Hermuthruda, who had put all former wooers to death but fell in love with Amleth. On his return to Britain, his first wife, whose love proved stronger than her resentment, told him of her father's intended revenge. In the ensuing battle, Amleth won the day by setting up the fallen dead from the day before on stakes, thereby terrifying the enemy.

He then returned with his two wives to Jutland, where he encountered the enmity of Wiglek, Rørik's successor. He was slain in a battle against Wiglek. Although she had promised to die with him, Hermuthruda instead married the victor. Saxo states that Amleth was buried on a plain (or "heath") in Jutland, famous for his name and burial place. Wiglek later died of illness and was the father of Wermund, from whom the royal line of Kings of Mercia descended.

The family tree of legendary Kings of the Danes, according to the Gesta Danorum (Books 1 to 9)

Kings of the Danes are marked with a crown (♕). Kings of the Swedes are marked with a dagger (†). Superscript numbers after a name indicate in which books of Gesta Danorum the individual is mentioned.

Humblus ♂ ^{(1)}
KEY
Angul ♂ ^{(1)}	♕ Dan I ♂ ^{(1)}	Grytha ♀ ^{(1)}	Marriage or coupling
Parent and child
The Angles	♕ Humblus ♂ ^{(1)}	♕ Lotherus ♂ ^{(1)}	King of the Saxons ♂ ^{(1)}	Succession by other or unclear means
Roarus ♂ ^{(1)}
Sigtrugus, King of the Swedes† ♂ ^{(1)}	♕ Skioldus ♂ ^{(1)}	Alvilda ♀ ^{(1)}
daughter of Roarus ♀ ^{(1)}	Bessus ♂ ^{(1)}
sister of Gram ♀ ^{(1)}	Gro ♀ ^{(1)}	♕ Gram† ♂ ^{(1)}	Sumblus, King of the Finns ♂ ^{(1)}
Wagnofthus ♂ ^{(1)}
Signe ♀ ^{(1)}	Henricus, King of the Saxons ♂ ^{(1)}	Haquinus, King of the Nitherians ♂ ^{(1)}
Harthgrepa ♀ ^{(1)}
♕Suibdagerus, King of Norway† ♂ ^{(1)}	sister of Guthormus ♀ ^{(1)}	♕Guthormus ♂ ^{(1)}	♕Hadingus ♂ ^{(1,2,4,5)}	Regnilda ♀ ^{(1)}
Asmundus† ♂ ^{(1)}	Gunnilda ♀ ^{(1)}	Guthormus ♂ ^{(1)}
Ulvilda ♀ ^{(1,2)}	♕ Ubbo ♂ ^{(2)}
Henricus ♂ ^{(1)}	Uffo† ♂ ^{(1)}	Hundingus† ♂ ^{(1,2)}	Thorilda ♀ ^{(2)}	Scottus ♂ ^{(2)}
daughter of Uffo ♀ ^{(1)}	Regnerus† ♂ ^{(2)}	Suanhuita ♀ ^{(2)}	sisters of Suanhuita ♀♀ ^{(2)}	Andwan, King of the Hellespont ♂ ^{(2)}
Thoraldus ♂ ^{(2)}
♕ Frotho I ♂ ^{(2,5)}	daughter of Andwan ♀ ^{(2)}
Hothbrodus† ♂ ^{(2,3)}	♕ Haldanus I ♂ ^{(2)}	Roe ♂ ^{(2)}	Skato ♂ ^{(2)}
Thora ♀ ^{(2)}
♕ Helgo ♂ ^{(2,3)}	♕ Roe ♂ ^{(2)}
Athislus† ♂ ^{(2,3)}	Ursa ♀ ^{(2)}
King Gevarus ♂ ^{(2,3)}	♕ Rolvo Krake† ♂ ^{(2,3)}	Ruta ♀ ^{(2)}	Biarco ♂ ^{(2)}	Sculda ♀ ^{(2)}	♕Hiarwarthus † ♂ ^{(2,3)}
♕ Hotherus† ♂ ^{(2,3)}	Nanna ♀ ^{(3)}	Herlecus ♂ ^{(3)}	Gericus ♂ ^{(3)}
former King of Britain ♂ ^{(3)}	mother of the King of Britain ♀ ^{(3)}	a slave ♂ ^{(3)}	a bondmaid ♀ ^{(3)}	♕ Roricus Slyngebond ♂ ^{(3)}	Gerwendillus ♂ ^{(3)}
King of Britain ♂ ^{(3,4)}	Queen of Britain ♀ ^{(3,4)}	Gerutha ♀ ^{(3,4)}	Horwendillus ♂ ^{(3,4)}	Fengo ♂ ^{(3,4)}
foster sister of Amlethus ♀ ^{(3,4)}	daughter of the King of Britain ♀ ^{(3,4)}	Amlethus ♂ ^{(3,4)}	Herminthruda, Queen of Scotland ♀ ^{(4)}	♕ Wiglecus ♂ ^{(4)}
son of Amlethus ♂ ^{(4)}	♕Wermundus ♂ ^{(4)}	Frowinus, governor of Sleswik ♂ ^{(4)}
♕ Uffo, or Olavus the Gentle ♂ ^{(4)}	daughter of Frowin ♀ ^{(4)}	Keto ♂ ^{(4)}	Wigo ♂ ^{(4)}
♕ Dan II ♂ ^{(4)}
♕ Huglecus ♂ ^{(4)}
♕ Frotho II, the Vigorous ♂ ^{(4)}
♕ Dan III ♂ ^{(4)}
Craca ♀ ^{(5)}	Regnerus ♂ ^{(5)}	Bracus ♂ ^{(5)}	♕ Fridlevus I, the Swift ♂ ^{(4,5)}	Hun, King of the Huns ♂ ^{(5)}	Hun ♂ ^{(5)}
Gøtarus, King of Norway ♂ ^{(5)}	Westmarus ♂ ^{(5)}	Colo ♂ ^{(5)}	Gøtwara ♀ ^{(5)}
Rollerus ♂ ^{(5)}	Ericus the Shrewd-spoken† ♂ ^{(5,6)}	Gunwara the Fair ♀ ^{(5)}	Alvilda ♀ ^{(5)}	♕ Frotho III ♂ ^{(5,6)}	Hanunda ♀ ^{(5)}	Grep (eldest of three) ♂ ^{(5)}	11 other sons (two named Grep) ♂♂ ^{(5)}
Hythin, King of Tellemark ♂ ^{(6)}	Alvo ♂ ^{(5)}	Ofura ♀ ^{(5)}	Arngrimus ♂ ^{(5)}	Grubbus ♂ ^{(6)}	♕ Hiarnus ♂ ^{(6)}	Amundus, King of Norway ♂ ^{(6)}
child of Hythin ^{(6)}	Haldanus† ♂ ^{(6)}	12 sons, including Angantir ♂♂ ^{(5)}	Ano ♂ ^{(6)}	Iuritha ♀ ^{(6)}	♕ Fridlevus II ♂ ^{(6)}	Frogertha ♀ ^{(6)}
Hanevus, King of Saxony ♂ ^{(6)}	Suertingus, King of Saxony ♂ ^{(6)}	Olavus ♂ ^{(6)}	♕ Frotho IV ♂ ^{(6)}
Sywardus† ♂ ^{(6,7)}	sons of Suertingus ♂♂ ^{(6)}	sister of the sons of Suertingus ♀ ^{(6)}	♕ Ingellus ♂ ^{(6,7)}	Helga ♀ ^{(6)}	Helgo ♂ ^{(6)}	Asa ♀ ^{(6)}
three sons that died in war ♂♂ ^{(7)}	♕ Olavus I ♂ ^{(7)}	Karolus, governor of Gothland ♂ ^{(7)}
Ulvilda ♀ ^{(7)}	♕ Frotho V ♂ ^{(7)}	Hatherus ♂ ^{(7)}	♕ Haraldus I ♂ ^{(7)}	Sygne ♀ ^{(7)}
Ericus† ♂ ^{(7)}	Thorhilda ♀ ^{(7)}	♕ Haldanus II Biargrammus† ♂ ^{(7)}	♕Haraldus II ♂ ^{(7)}
Ebbo ♂ ^{(7)}	mother of Otharus ♀ ^{(7)}	♕ Unguinus, King of the Goths ♂ ^{(7)}	Asmundus ♂ ^{(7)}
sister of Otharus ♀ ^{(7)}	♕ Sywaldus I ♂ ^{(7)}	Sygrutha ♀ ^{(7)}	Kings of Norway
Sywardus, King of the Goths ♂ ^{(7)}	mother of Alvilda ♀ ^{(7)}	Otharus ♂ ^{(7)}	Syritha ♀ ^{(7)}	♕ Sygarus ♂ ^{(7)}	queen of Sygarus ♀ ^{(7)}	Hamundus, a petty king ♂ ^{(7)}
Wemundus ♂ ^{(7)}	Ostenus ♂ ^{(7)}	♕Sywaldus II ♂ ^{(7)}	Algerus ♂ ^{(7)}	Helwin ♂ ^{(7)}	Hamundus ♂ ^{(7)}
Regnaldus, King of the Northmen ♂ ^{(7)}	Alvilda ♀ ^{(7)}	Alf ♂ ^{(7)}	Sygne ♂ ^{(7)}	Hagbarthus ♂ ^{(7)}	Hako ♂ ^{(7)}
Gro ♀ ^{(7)}	Borcarus ♂ ^{(7)}	Drota ♀ ^{(7)}	Gunnarus ♂ ^{(7)}	Hano, ruler of Funen ♂ ^{(7)}	Ostmarus, ruler of Scania ♂ ^{(7)}	Hundingus, ruler of Zealand ♂ ^{(7)}	Roricus, co-ruler of Jutland ♂ ^{(7)}	Hatherus, co-ruler of Jutland ♂ ^{(7)}
Haraldus ♂ ^{(7)}	Hildigerus ♂ ^{(7)}	Røtho, a Ruthenian pirate ♂ ^{(7)}	Wesetus ♂
♕Haldanus III ♂ ^{(7)}	Guritha ♀ ^{(7)}
Alverus† ♂ ^{(7,8)}	♕ Haraldus III Hyldetan ♂ ^{(7)}
Olavus ♂ ^{(7)}	Ingo ♂ ^{(7)}	Ingeldus† ♂ ^{(7)}	sister of Haraldus ♀ ^{(7)}	Ubbo ♂ ^{(7)}	sister of Haraldus ♀ ^{(7)}	Sywardus ♂ ^{(7)}	sister of Haraldus ♀ ^{(7)}	Olavus, king of the Werms ♂ ^{(7)}
♕ Ringo I† ♂ ^{(7,8)}	♕ Hetha ♀ ^{(8)}	♕ Olo the Vigorous ♂ ^{(7,8)}	Esa ♀ ^{(7)}	son of the king ♂ ^{(7,8)}
Atylo the Scanian ♂ ^{(8)}	Ringo, ruler of Norway ♂ ^{(8)}
Tola ♂ ^{(8)}	Omothus, or Homothus ♂ ^{(8)}	daughter of Ringo ♀ ^{(8)}	Esa ♀ ^{(8)}	♕ Omundus ♂ ^{(7,8)}
Sibbo ♂ ^{(8)}	sister of Gøtarus ♀ ^{(8)}	Gøtarus† ♂ ^{(8)}	daughter of Omundus ♀ ^{(8)}	♕ Sywardus I ♂ ^{(8)}	♕ Buthlus ♂ ^{(8)}	daughter of Omundus ♀ ^{(8)}
Ebbo ♂ ^{(8)}
early wife of Iarmericus ♀ ^{(8)}	♕Iarmericus † ♂ ^{(8)}	Suanilda ♀ ^{(8)}	the Hellepontines, 4 brothers ♂♂ ^{(8)}	Iarmericus' sister, sold to Norwegians ♀ ^{(8)}	Iarmericus' sister, sold to Germans ♀ ^{(8)}
♕ Broderus ♂ ^{(8)}	nephews of Iarmericus ♂♂ ^{(8)}
King of the Goths ♂ ^{(8)}	♕ Sywaldus III ♂ ^{(8)}
King of Sweden† ♂ ^{(8)}	daughter of the King of the Goths ♀ ^{(8)}	♕ Snio ♂ ^{(8)}
♕ Biorn ♂ ^{(8)}
♕ Haraldus III ♂ ^{(8)}
a queen from Sweden ♀ ^{(8)}	♕ Gormo I ♂ ^{(8)}
♕ Gotricus, or Godefridus ♂ ^{(8,9)}
♕ Olavus III ♂ ^{(9)}	daughter of Gotricus ♀ ^{(9)}	Sywardus, King of Norway ♂ ^{(9)}	unknown
♕Hemmingus ♂ ^{(9)}	♕Siwardus II Ring ♂ ^{(9)}	♕ Ringo II ♂ ^{(9)}	Herothus† ♂ ^{(9)}	Hesbernus ♂ ^{(9)}
ruler in Norway ♂ ^{(9)}	Lathgertha ♀ ^{(9)}	♕Regnerus Lothbrog ♂ ^{(9)}	Thora ♀ ^{(9)}
Suanlogha ♀ ^{(9)}	a woman ♀ ^{(9)}
2 daughters ♀♀ ^{(9)}	Fridlevus ♂ ^{(9)}	♕ Haraldus ♂ ^{(9)}	♕ Siwardus & Ericus ♂♂ ^{(9)}	Rathbarthus ♂ ^{(9)}	Dunwatus ♂ ^{(9)}	Ubbo ♂ ^{(9)}
Regnaldus ♂ ^{(9)}	Withsercus ♂ ^{(9)}	Ericus Wind-hat ♂ ^{(9)}	Guthormus ♂ ^{(9)}	♕ Ericus I ♂ ^{(9)}	♕ Sywardus Snake-Eye ♂ ^{(9)}	Biornus ♂ ^{(9)}	Agnerus ♂ ^{(9)}	Ivarus ♂ ^{(9)}
daughter of Guthormus ♀ ^{(9)}	♕ Ericus II ♂ ^{(9)}
♕ Kanutus I ♂ ^{(9)}
♕ Frotho VI ♂ ^{(9)}
♕ Gormo II the English ♂ ^{(9)}
♕ Haraldus V ♂ ^{(9)}	Hedelradus, King of England ♂ ^{(9)}
♕ Gormo III ♂ ^{(9)}	Thira ♀ ^{(9)}
Kanutus ♂ ^{(9)}	Haraldus VI ♂ ^{(9)}

Genealogical information is derived from Oliver Elton's 1905 translation, The First Nine Books of the Danish History of Saxo Grammaticus (via Wikisource). Name spellings are from the 1931 Latin critical edition by Olrik and Ræder (via Wikisource). Regnal numbers, which do not appear in the original text, are included for clarity and taken from the engraving Veræ effigies regum omnium by Erico Olai Tormio.

=== Gesta Danorum pa Danskæ and Sagnkrønike ===
Late compilations such as the Gesta Danorum pa danskæ (dating around 1300) and the Compendium Saxonis (mid-14th century) summarize the story. References can also be found in the Annales Ryenses, the Annales Slesvicensis, the Runekrønike (Runic Chronicle) section of the Codex Runicus, and other manuscripts summarizing the Danish kings. None of these, however, precedes Saxo Grammaticus. According to Marijane Osborn the 15th-century Sagnkrønike from Stockholm contains several elements that may have been derived from an older story.

According to the Danish Gesta the legendary King Rorik Slengeborre of Denmark made Orwendel and Feng rulers in Jutland, and gave his daughter to Orwendel as a reward for his good service. Orwendel and the daughter had a son, Amblothæ. The jealous Feng killed Orwendel and took his wife. Amblothæ understood that his life was in danger and tried to survive by pretending to be insane. Feng sent Amblothæ to the king of Britain with two servants, who carried a message directing the British king to kill Amblothæ. While the servants slept, Amblothæ carved off the (probably runic) message and wrote that the servants were to be killed and that he should be married to the king's daughter. The British king did what the message said. Exactly one year later, Feng drank to the memory of Amblothæ, but Amblothæ appeared and killed him, burnt Feng's men to death in a tent, and became the ruler of Jutland. Then he went back to Britain to kill the British king, who wanted to avenge Feng's death and marry Scotland's queen. Amblothæ went back to Jutland and was killed in battle upon arrival.

According to the Sagnkrønike Amlæd was killed by his brother in law, the King of Norway (Shakespeare's Fortinbras) in a sea battle on the Øresund, as he tried to gain control over the neighbouring territory. His death was avenged, however, by his widow queen Yngafred, who slew the Norwegian king and many of his men.

The family tree of legendary Kings of the Danes, according to Gesta Danorum på danskæ (extract)

Kings of the Danes are marked with a crown (♕).

♕ Halfdan ♂	Ro ♂	Skat ♂	KEY
Marriage or coupling
♕ Ro or Halfdan ♂	♕ Helghe ♂	Thore ♀	Parent and child
Succession by other means
♕ A dog king ♂	Yrse ♀
♕ Snio ♂	♕ Rolf Krage ♂	Skulda ♀	♕ Hartwar ♂
Hodbrod ♂	Hadding's daughter ♀
♕ Hother ♂
♕ Rorik Slengeborre, also called Rake ♂	Rorik's sister ♀	Orwendel ♂	Feng ♂
King of Britain's daughter ♀	Amblothe ♂	Queen of Scotland ♀
♕ Wighlek ♂	Nanna ♀
♕ Wermund ♂
♕ Offe the Strong ♂

The source used for the genealogical information and name spellings is the English translation provided by Peter Tunstall.

=== Icelandic versions ===
In Iceland, the early modern Ambale's Saga is a romantic tale (the earliest manuscript dates from the 17th century). Thormodus Torfæus recorded in 1702 that he "often heard the story of Amlod related in Iceland by old women" in his youth. The folk-tale of Brjam was put in writing in 1707. In the Ambale's Saga, besides romantic additions, some traits point to an earlier version of the tale.

Also comparable is the medieval Hrólfs saga kraka, where the brothers Helgi (known as Halga in Beowulf) and Hroar (Hroðgar) take the place of the hero (corresponding to the tale of Harald and Halfdan in the seventh book of Saxo Grammaticus); Helgi and Hroar, like Harald and Halfdan, avenge their father's murder by their uncle by burning the uncle in his palace. Harald and Halfdan escape after their father's death by being brought up with dogs' names in a hollow oak, and subsequently by feigning madness. In the case of the other brothers, there are traces of a similar motive since the boys are called by dogs' names. Thomas Spray has shown that many of the Icelandic sagas are clearly structured similarly to the Hamlet narrative.

== Comparative mythology ==
The similarities of Saxo's version with the classical tale of Lucius Junius Brutus as told by Livy, by Valerius Maximus, and by Dionysius of Halicarnassus are likely deliberate, as the incident of the gold-filled sticks could hardly appear fortuitously in both, and a comparison of the harangues of Amleth (Saxo, Book iv.) and Brutus (Dionysius, iv. 77) shows marked similarities. In both tales, the usurping uncle is ultimately succeeded by the nephew. The latter has escaped notice during his youth by a feigned madness. Nevertheless, the parts played by the personages who in Shakespeare became Ophelia and Polonius, the method of revenge, and the whole narrative of Amleth's adventure in England, have no parallels in the Latin story.

Further resemblances exist in the Ambale's Saga with the tales of Bellerophon, of Heracles, and of Servius Tullius. This concerns especially the episode of the "traitorous letter" (ordering the death of the bearer), also found in the Old French (13th-century) Dit de l'empereur Constant, and further afield in various Arabian and Indian tales.

There are also striking similarities between the story of Amleth and that of Kai Khosrow in the Shahnameh (Book of the King) of the Persian poet Firdausi. In ancient Egyptian mythology, a similar tale of a king who is murdered by a jealous brother but avenged by his son appears in the narrative of Osiris, Set and Horus.

== 16th-century reception ==
Outside Scandinavia, the story of Amleth or Hamlet was popularized through François de Belleforest's French Histoires tragiques (Paris, Chez Jean Hupeau, 1572, Fueil 149), where it appears as the fifth story of the fifth volume. An English version, The Hystorie of Hamblet, was published in 1608. An English stage version, conventionally known as the Ur-Hamlet, appeared by 1589. The play is lost but is mentioned in a few other sources, the first being Thomas Nashe's 1589 preface to Robert Greene's Menaphon.

William Shakespeare wrote his play Hamlet sometime between 1599 and 1602. The Ur-Hamlet is thought to be his primary source; his version owes but the outline of the story to Saxo. In character, Shakespeare's Prince Hamlet is diametrically opposed to his prototype. Amleth's madness was certainly altogether feigned; he prepared his vengeance a year beforehand and carried it out deliberately and ruthlessly at every point. His riddling speech has little more than an outward similarity to the words of Hamlet. However, he resembles him in his disconcerting penetration into his enemies' plans.

== Modern adaptations ==
Henry Treece adapted the story of Amleth from Saxo for his 1966 novel The Green Man.

The legend was taken as the basis of a 1994 film by Gabriel Axel, Prince of Jutland (also known as Royal Deceit), with Gabriel Byrne as Fenge, Helen Mirren as Geruth and Christian Bale as Amled.

The Amleth story was also the basis for the 1994 Disney film The Lion King.

The legend, woven together with Shakespeare's play, forms the basis for Alan Gordon's novel An Antic Disposition (2004), the fifth novel in Gordon's "Fools' Guild" series.

Amleth's story was also adapted into the 2022 film The Northman, directed by the American director Robert Eggers who also co-wrote the script with Icelandic author Sjón, with Alexander Skarsgård as Amleth.

== See also ==
- Sources of Hamlet
- Hamlet's Grave
