= Frotho III =

Legendary king of Denmark

Frotho III (or Frode or Fróði) was a legendary king of Denmark. His life was recounted in book 5 of Gesta Danorum by Saxo Grammaticus, and in the Skjöldunga saga.

== Gesta Danorum ==
Frotho III was the son and successor of Fridlevus I. Frotho reigned together with twelve "Diaren". He fought against the Slavs (sclavi) and defeated them. Then he sought the hand Hanunda, daughter of the King of the Huns. When she refused, a sorceress in his retinue changed her mind. Hanunda became his wife, but later was unfaithful with a man named Grep (nephew of the sorceress, Gotwar). Frotho fell under the bad influence of Grep and certain other advisors until the arrival of Erik, who killed Grep and his father Westmar and exposed Hanunda's infidelity. Frotho initially tried to capture Erik until he saves the king from drowning. Frotho put aside Hanunda, marrying her instead of Erik's brother, while Erik himself married Frotho's sister. Frode married Alvhild, daughter of the Norwegian King Gothar who he killed in battle. The King of the Huns attacked Frode with an alliance of several princes. After three days you could go over the corpses through the water. Frode won after seven days, called for the lords to return to their dominions again. (Holmgard = Novgorod, Koenugard = Kiev, Revallis = Reval / Tallinn, Lapland, Eistland = Baltics). The King of the Huns was killed in battle and his ally, King Olmar of the Easterlings, surrendered. Frotho subsequently killed King Alrik of Sweden in single combat.

Frotho's reign, which Saxo said coincided with the life of Jesus, was marked by an uninterrupted worldwide peace. He was eventually killed by a sorceress in the shape of a sea-cow. Frode was succeeded by his son Fridlevus.

The family tree of legendary Kings of the Danes, according to the Gesta Danorum (Books I to VII)

Kings of the Danes are in bold and marked with a crown (♕). Kings of the Swedes are marked with a dagger (†). Superscript numbers before a name indicate in which books of Gesta Danorum the individual is mentioned.

^{(1)} Humble
KEY
^{(1)} Angul	^{(1)} **Dan** ♕	^{(1)} Grytha	Marriage or coupling
Parent and child
The Angles	^{(1)} **Humble** ♕	^{(1)} **Lother** ♕	^{(1)} King of the Saxons	Succession by other or unclear means
^{(1)} Roar
^{(1)} Sigtryg, King of the Swedes†	^{(1)} **Skiold** ♕	^{(1)} Alfhild
^{(1)} daughter of Roar	^{(1)} Bess
^{(1)} sister of Gram	^{(1)} Gróa	^{(1)} **Gram** ♕†	^{(1)} Sumble, King of the Finns
^{(1)} Wagnhofde
^{(1)} Signe	^{(1)} Henry, King of the Saxons	^{(1)} Hakon, King of the Nitherians
^{(1)} Hardgrep
^{(1)} **Swipdag** ♕†, King of Norway	^{(1)} sister of Guthorm	^{(1)} **Guthorm** ♕	^{(1,2,5)} **Hadding** ♕	^{(1)} Ragnhild
^{(1)} Asmund†	^{(1)} Gunnhild	^{(1)} Guthorm
^{(1,2)} Ulfhild	^{(2)} **Ubbe** ♕
^{(1)} Henry	^{(1)} Uffe†	^{(1,2)} Hunding†	^{(2)} Thorhild	^{(2)} Scot
^{(1)} daughter of Uffe	^{(2)} Ragnar†	^{(2)} Swanhwid	^{(2)} sisters of Swanhwid	^{(2)} Handwan
^{(2)} Thorwald
^{(2,5)} **Frode** ♕	^{(2)} daughter of Handwan
^{(2,3)} Hothbrodd†	^{(2)} **Halfdan** ♕	^{(2)} Ro	^{(2)} Skat
^{(2)} Thora
^{(2,3)} **Helge** ♕	^{(2)} **Ro** ♕
^{(2,3)} Athisl†	^{(2)} Urse
^{(2,3)} King Gewar	^{(2,3)} **Rolf** Krage ♕†	^{(2)} Rute	^{(2)} Bjarke	^{(2)} Skulde	^{(2,3)} **Hiartuar** †♕
^{(2,3)} **Hother** †♕	^{(3)} Nanna	^{(3)} Herlek	^{(3)} Gerit
^{(3)} former King of Britain	^{(3)} mother of the King of Britain	^{(3)} a slave	^{(3)} a bondmaid	^{(3)} **Rorik** Slyngebond ♕	^{(3)} Gerwendil
^{(3,4)} King of Britain	^{(3,4)} Queen of Britain	^{(3,4)} Gerutha	^{(3,4)} Horwendil	^{(3,4)} Feng
^{(3,4)} foster sister of Amleth	^{(3,4)} daughter of the King of Britain	^{(3,4)} Amleth	^{(4)} Hermutrude, Queen of Scotland	^{(4)} **Wiglek** ♕
^{(4)} son of Amleth	^{(4)} **Wermund** ♕	^{(4)} Frowin, governor of Sleswik
^{(4)} **Uffe** ♕, aka Olaf the Gentle	^{(4)} daughter of Frowin	^{(4)} Ket	^{(4)} Wig
^{(4)} **Dan** ♕
^{(4)} **Hugleik** ♕
^{(4)} **Frode** the Vigorous ♕
^{(4)} **Dan** ♕
^{(5)} Kraka	^{(5)} Ragnar	^{(5)} Brak	^{(4,5)} **Fridleif** the Swift ♕	^{(5)} Hun, King of the Huns	^{(5)} Hun
^{(5)} Gotar, King of Norway	^{(5)} Westmar	^{(5)} Koll	^{(5)} Gotwar
^{(5)} Roller	^{(5,6)} Erik† Shrewd-spoken	^{(5)} Gunwar the Fair	^{(5)} Alfhild	^{(5,6)} **Frode** ♕	^{(5)} Hanund	^{(5)} Grep (eldest of three)	^{(5)} 11 other sons (two named Grep)
^{(6)} Hythin, King of Tellemark	^{(5)} Alf	^{(5)} Eyfura	^{(5)} Arngrim	^{(6)} Grubb	^{(6)} **Hiarn** ♕	^{(6)} Amund, King of Norway
^{(6)} child of Hythin	^{(6)} Halfdan†	^{(5)} 12 sons, including Anganty	^{(6)} Ane	^{(6)} Juritha	^{(6)} **Fridleif** ♕	^{(6)} Frogertha
^{(6)} Hanef, King of Saxony	^{(6)} Swerting, King of Saxony	^{(6)} Olaf	^{(6)} **Frode** ♕
^{(6,7)} Siward†	^{(6)} sons of Swerting	^{(6)} sister of the sons of Swerting	^{(6,7)} **Ingild** ♕	^{(6)} Helga	^{(6)} Helge	^{(6)} Asa
^{(6,7)} Frode	^{(6,7)} Fridleif	^{(6,7)} Ingild	^{(6,7)} **Olaf** ♕	^{(7)} Karl, governor of Gothland
^{(7)} Ulfhild	^{(7)} **Frode** ♕	^{(7)} Hather, a chief	^{(7)} **Harald** ♕	^{(7)} Signe
^{(7)} Erik†	^{(7)} Thorhild	^{(7)} **Halfdan** Biargramm ♕†	^{(7)} Harald
^{(7)} Asmund
Kings of Norway

Name spellings are derived from Oliver Elton's 1905 translation, The First Nine Books of the Danish History of Saxo Grammaticus, via Wikisource.

== Theories and commentary ==
Saxo divided the life of Frotho III into two parts, each featuring counselors to the king. The first covered the king's ascendancy after the death of his father and was dominated by the issue of guardianship on account of his minority. This part was an unflattering account due to the influence of evil counselors. The second part, which roughly began in Book V, saw the emergence of the virtuous Ericus as a new counselor who guided the king towards the path of Fortitudo, Temperantia, and Constantia. The new period described Frotho III as a peacemaker and legislator (law-giver) with Saxo claiming he was responsible for the Danish hegemony.

Viktor Rydberg considered Saxo's account of Frotho's reign to be a historicized version of the Vana-god Frey, which was particularly demonstrated in the section detailing the king's war against the Huns.

== See also ==
- Fróði

== Literature ==
- Saxo Grammaticus, Gesta Danorum, 4.12, 13
- Skjöldunga saga
- V. A. Motornyĭ, Dietrich Scholze, Konstantin Konstantinovich Trofimovich: Prašenja sorabistiki, Sorbisches Institut (Institut slavistyky) Bautzen 2003 Digitalisat, S. 66
