= Angul (mythology) =

Legendary ancestor of the Angles and Danes

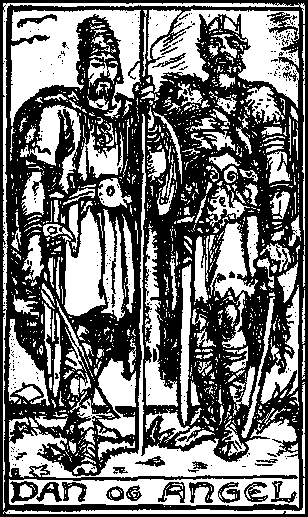
Angul, depicted with his brother Dan.

Angul (or Angel) is a figure in Nordic mythology who, according to the Gesta Danorum was the ancestor of the Danes, along with his brother Dan. He was also the ancestor of the Angles (or English) in Denmark, who later migrated to Great Britain, naming the land they settled England.

== Attestations ==
=== Gesta Danorum ===
Saxo Grammaticus' Gesta Danorum describes how the two sons of Humble, Angul and Dan, are the forefathers and founders of the Danes. Together, they became rulers of their realm through the support of their kinsmen but did not use the term "king".

Angul is then described as also being the ancestor of the Angles, who later migrated to Britain, naming the region England ultimately after Angul:

Latin text

Ex quibus Angul, a quo gentis Anglicae principia manasse memoriae proditum est, nomen suum provinciae, cui praeerat, aptandum curavit, levi monumenti genere perennem sui notitiam traditurus. Cuius successores postmodum Britannia potiti priscum insulae nomen novo patriae suae vocabulo permutarunt. Magni id factum a veteribus aestimatum. Testis est Beda, non minima pars divini stili, qui in Anglia ortus sanctissimis suorum voluminum thesauris res patrias sociare curae habuit, aeque ad religionem pertinere iudicans patriae facta litteris illustrare et res divinas conscribere.

Elton & Powell translation

Of these two, Angul, the fountain, so runs the tradition, of the beginnings of the Anglian race, caused his name to be applied to the district which he ruled. This was an easy kind of memorial wherewith to immortalise his fame: for his successors a little later, when they gained possession of Britain, changed the original name of the island for a fresh title, that of their own land. This action was much thought of by the ancients: witness Bede, no mean figure among the writers of the Church, who was a native of England, and made it his care to embody the doings of his country in the most hallowed treasury of his pages; deeming it equally a religious duty to glorify in writing the deeds of his land, and to chronicle the history of the Church.

Friis-Jensen and Fisher translation

Old reports maintain that the English race arose from this Angel, who had his name given to the region he governed, resolving to pass on an undying recognition of himself by an easy kind of memorial. His descendants later conquered Britain and substituted the new title of their own land for the island's original name. This action was highly thought of in past ages. One witness to this is Bede, a major contributor to Christian literature, who as an Englishman, took pains to bring his country's history into the sacred treasury of his books, considering it in equal piety both to pen the deeds of his motherland and to write about religion.

The family tree of legendary Kings of the Danes, according to the Gesta Danorum (Books I to VII)

Kings of the Danes are in bold and marked with a crown (♕). Kings of the Swedes are marked with a dagger (†). Superscript numbers before a name indicate in which books of Gesta Danorum the individual is mentioned.

^{(1)} Humble
KEY
^{(1)} Angul	^{(1)} **Dan** ♕	^{(1)} Grytha	Marriage or coupling
Parent and child
The Angles	^{(1)} **Humble** ♕	^{(1)} **Lother** ♕	^{(1)} King of the Saxons	Succession by other or unclear means
^{(1)} Roar
^{(1)} Sigtryg, King of the Swedes†	^{(1)} **Skiold** ♕	^{(1)} Alfhild
^{(1)} daughter of Roar	^{(1)} Bess
^{(1)} sister of Gram	^{(1)} Gróa	^{(1)} **Gram** ♕†	^{(1)} Sumble, King of the Finns
^{(1)} Wagnhofde
^{(1)} Signe	^{(1)} Henry, King of the Saxons	^{(1)} Hakon, King of the Nitherians
^{(1)} Hardgrep
^{(1)} **Swipdag** ♕†, King of Norway	^{(1)} sister of Guthorm	^{(1)} **Guthorm** ♕	^{(1,2,5)} **Hadding** ♕	^{(1)} Ragnhild
^{(1)} Asmund†	^{(1)} Gunnhild	^{(1)} Guthorm
^{(1,2)} Ulfhild	^{(2)} **Ubbe** ♕
^{(1)} Henry	^{(1)} Uffe†	^{(1,2)} Hunding†	^{(2)} Thorhild	^{(2)} Scot
^{(1)} daughter of Uffe	^{(2)} Ragnar†	^{(2)} Swanhwid	^{(2)} sisters of Swanhwid	^{(2)} Handwan
^{(2)} Thorwald
^{(2,5)} **Frode** ♕	^{(2)} daughter of Handwan
^{(2,3)} Hothbrodd†	^{(2)} **Halfdan** ♕	^{(2)} Ro	^{(2)} Skat
^{(2)} Thora
^{(2,3)} **Helge** ♕	^{(2)} **Ro** ♕
^{(2,3)} Athisl†	^{(2)} Urse
^{(2,3)} King Gewar	^{(2,3)} **Rolf** Krage ♕†	^{(2)} Rute	^{(2)} Bjarke	^{(2)} Skulde	^{(2,3)} **Hiartuar** †♕
^{(2,3)} **Hother** †♕	^{(3)} Nanna	^{(3)} Herlek	^{(3)} Gerit
^{(3)} former King of Britain	^{(3)} mother of the King of Britain	^{(3)} a slave	^{(3)} a bondmaid	^{(3)} **Rorik** Slyngebond ♕	^{(3)} Gerwendil
^{(3,4)} King of Britain	^{(3,4)} Queen of Britain	^{(3,4)} Gerutha	^{(3,4)} Horwendil	^{(3,4)} Feng
^{(3,4)} foster sister of Amleth	^{(3,4)} daughter of the King of Britain	^{(3,4)} Amleth	^{(4)} Hermutrude, Queen of Scotland	^{(4)} **Wiglek** ♕
^{(4)} son of Amleth	^{(4)} **Wermund** ♕	^{(4)} Frowin, governor of Sleswik
^{(4)} **Uffe** ♕, aka Olaf the Gentle	^{(4)} daughter of Frowin	^{(4)} Ket	^{(4)} Wig
^{(4)} **Dan** ♕
^{(4)} **Hugleik** ♕
^{(4)} **Frode** the Vigorous ♕
^{(4)} **Dan** ♕
^{(5)} Kraka	^{(5)} Ragnar	^{(5)} Brak	^{(4,5)} **Fridleif** the Swift ♕	^{(5)} Hun, King of the Huns	^{(5)} Hun
^{(5)} Gotar, King of Norway	^{(5)} Westmar	^{(5)} Koll	^{(5)} Gotwar
^{(5)} Roller	^{(5,6)} Erik† Shrewd-spoken	^{(5)} Gunwar the Fair	^{(5)} Alfhild	^{(5,6)} **Frode** ♕	^{(5)} Hanund	^{(5)} Grep (eldest of three)	^{(5)} 11 other sons (two named Grep)
^{(6)} Hythin, King of Tellemark	^{(5)} Alf	^{(5)} Eyfura	^{(5)} Arngrim	^{(6)} Grubb	^{(6)} **Hiarn** ♕	^{(6)} Amund, King of Norway
^{(6)} child of Hythin	^{(6)} Halfdan†	^{(5)} 12 sons, including Anganty	^{(6)} Ane	^{(6)} Juritha	^{(6)} **Fridleif** ♕	^{(6)} Frogertha
^{(6)} Hanef, King of Saxony	^{(6)} Swerting, King of Saxony	^{(6)} Olaf	^{(6)} **Frode** ♕
^{(6,7)} Siward†	^{(6)} sons of Swerting	^{(6)} sister of the sons of Swerting	^{(6,7)} **Ingild** ♕	^{(6)} Helga	^{(6)} Helge	^{(6)} Asa
^{(6,7)} Frode	^{(6,7)} Fridleif	^{(6,7)} Ingild	^{(6,7)} **Olaf** ♕	^{(7)} Karl, governor of Gothland
^{(7)} Ulfhild	^{(7)} **Frode** ♕	^{(7)} Hather, a chief	^{(7)} **Harald** ♕	^{(7)} Signe
^{(7)} Erik†	^{(7)} Thorhild	^{(7)} **Halfdan** Biargramm ♕†	^{(7)} Harald
^{(7)} Asmund
Kings of Norway

Name spellings are derived from Oliver Elton's 1905 translation, The First Nine Books of the Danish History of Saxo Grammaticus, via Wikisource.

== Interpretation and discussion ==
=== Relationship to other Germanic tribal beginnings ===
Though not mentioning Angul, his brother Dan is referred to in other medieval works as the ancestor of the Danes. In the Chronicle of Lejre, Dan, the son of King Ypper of Uppsala, becomes king of the Danes, while his brothers Nori and Östen become kings of Norway and the Swedes. Consistent with this, in Jordanes' Getica, written in the 6th century, the Danes, of the same tribe as the Swedes, are said to have emigrated from Sweden to Denmark in ancient times. Unlike other accounts such as the Prose Edda, Gesta Danorum makes the founders of the Danish royal line descended from humans rather than gods.

=== Inclusion by Saxo Grammaticus ===
In contrast to many other writers at the time that traced the descent of the nation in question to the Trojans, Saxo favoured heathen forefathers from the land itself. This was possibly intended to show that the Danes were independent from, and equal, to the Romans. It has been argued that Dan and Angul resembling Romulus and Remus, fitting into a wider system of parallels between the accounts in Gesta Danorum and Roman tradition. It is unclear when Saxo conceived of Dan and Angul as having lived, with the Chronicle of Lejre recording that Dan lived at the time of Emperor Augustus, while Saxo puts them over twenty generations before him. This would be a further similarity with Romulus and Remus, with whom they would have been roughly contemporaries by his account.

It has been further proposed that Saxo included Angul in his account of the origin of the Danes to emphasise the close connection between the Danes and the English. This is consistent with earlier Old English literature that shows that the history of the Angles during and before the migration from the Danish region was remembered and seen as part of the history of the English more widely. It has also been noted that along with the works of Bede, Saxo refers to the writings of Dudo of Saint-Quentin and Paul the Deacon who discuss the origins of the Normans and the Langobards, who, like the English, can be seen as having descended from the Danes.

== See also ==
- Rígsþula
- Anglo-Saxons

== Bibliography ==
=== Primary ===
- Friis-Jensen, Karsten; Fisher, Peter (2015). Gesta Danorum: the history of the Danes. Oxford: Oxford University Press. ISBN 9780198205234.
- Grammaticus, Saxo. The Danish History, Book 1. Translated by Elton, Oliver; Powell, Frederick.
- Grammaticus, Saxo. Gesta Danorum, Liber 1, Caput 1.
- Jordanes (1915). The Gothic history of Jordanes in English version;. Translated by Mierow, Charles. Princeton, Univ. Press.

=== Secondary ===
- Allport, Ben (2022). "The Prehistory of Frá Fornjóti ok hans ættmönnum: Connections with the Chronicon Lethrense and their Consequences". Neophilologus. 106 (3): 513–532. doi:10.1007/s11061-021-09723-4. hdl:11250/3001199. ISSN 0028-2677.
- Bailey, Christopher (2002). Saxo Grammaticus: History and the Rise of National Identity in Medieval Denmark. Eastern Illinois University.
- Berend, Nora (2018). "How many medieval Europes? The 'Pagans' of Hungary and Regional Diversity in Christendom". The medieval world (Second ed.). London. pp. 72–87. doi:10.4324/9781315102511-5. ISBN 9781315102511.
- Chismol, Guillem (2018). "Estado, nación y sentimiento nacional en la Baja Edad Media". Mirabilia/MedTrans: Mirabilia/Mediterranean and Transatlantic Approaches to the Culture of the Crown of Aragon (in Catalan) (1): 2–24.
- Hordern, Kjersten Anne Talsnes (2004). "A postcolonial reading of the Middle English romance "Havelok the Dane"". University of Regina. Faculty of Graduate Studies and Research, University of Regina.
