= Feng (chieftain) =

Legendary ruler in Jutland, Denmark

Feng was a legendary Jutish chieftain and the prototype for William Shakespeare's King Claudius. He appears in Saxo Grammaticus' Gesta Danorum (book 3) and Gesta Danorum på danskæ.

The Gesta Danorum and its Danish counterpart tell that the Danish king Rorik Slengeborre put Horwendill and Feng as his rulers in Jutland, and gave his daughter to Horwendill as a reward for his good services. Horwendill and the daughter had the son Amblothe (Hamlet). The jealous Feng killed Horwendill and took his wife. Amblothe understood that his life was in danger and tried to survive by faking insanity. Feng sent Amblothe to the king of Britain with two servants carrying a message that the British king should kill Amblothe. While the servants slept, Amblothe carved off the (probably runic) message and wrote that the servants should be killed and himself married to the king's daughter. The British king did what the message said. Exactly one year later, Feng drank to Amblothe's memory, but Amblothe appeared and killed him.

According to Saxo, Feng and Horwendill were the sons of Jutland's ruler Gervendill, and succeeded him as the rulers of Jutland. Rørik Slyngebond, king of Denmark, gave his daughter to Horwendill; the couple then had a son, Amleth. But Feng, out of jealousy, murdered Horwendill, and persuaded Gerutha to become his wife, on the plea that he had committed the crime for no other reason than to avenge her of a husband by whom she had been hated. Amleth, afraid of sharing his father's fate, pretended to be imbecile, but the suspicion of Feng put him to various tests which are related in detail. Among other things they sought to entangle him with a young girl, his foster-sister, but his cunning saved him. When, however, Amleth slew the eavesdropper hidden, like Polonius, in his mother's room, and destroyed all trace of the deed, Feng was assured that the young man's madness was feigned. Accordingly, he dispatched him to England in company with two attendants, who bore a letter enjoining the king of the country to put him to death. Amleth surmised the purport of their instructions, and secretly altered the message on their wooden tablets to the effect that the king should put the attendants to death and give Amleth his daughter in marriage.

After marrying the princess, Amleth returned at the end of a year to Denmark. Of the wealth he had accumulated he took with him only certain hollow sticks filled with gold. He arrived in time for a funeral feast, held to celebrate his supposed death. During the feast he plied the courtiers with wine, and executed his vengeance during their drunken sleep by fastening down over them the woolen hangings of the hall with pegs he had sharpened during his feigned madness, and then setting fire to the palace. He then killed Feng with his own sword.

As can be seen, many plot elements of Shakespeare's Hamlet are present in this account. However, they are placed in Jutland—the diametrical opposite side of Denmark from Elsinore, which had become identified with Hamlet due to the Shakespearean account.

The family tree of legendary Kings of the Danes, according to the Gesta Danorum (Books I to VII)

Kings of the Danes are in bold and marked with a crown (♕). Kings of the Swedes are marked with a dagger (†). Superscript numbers before a name indicate in which books of Gesta Danorum the individual is mentioned.

^{(1)} Humble
KEY
^{(1)} Angul | ^{(1)} **Dan** ♕ | ^{(1)} Grytha | Marriage or coupling
Parent and child
The Angles | ^{(1)} **Humble** ♕ | ^{(1)} **Lother** ♕ | ^{(1)} King of the Saxons | Succession by other or unclear means
^{(1)} Roar
^{(1)} Sigtryg, King of the Swedes† | ^{(1)} **Skiold** ♕ | ^{(1)} Alfhild
^{(1)} daughter of Roar | ^{(1)} Bess
^{(1)} sister of Gram | ^{(1)} Gróa | ^{(1)} **Gram** ♕† | ^{(1)} Sumble, King of the Finns
^{(1)} Wagnhofde
^{(1)} Signe | ^{(1)} Henry, King of the Saxons | ^{(1)} Hakon, King of the Nitherians
^{(1)} Hardgrep
^{(1)} **Swipdag** ♕†, King of Norway | ^{(1)} sister of Guthorm | ^{(1)} **Guthorm** ♕ | ^{(1,2,5)} **Hadding** ♕ | ^{(1)} Ragnhild
^{(1)} Asmund† | ^{(1)} Gunnhild | ^{(1)} Guthorm
^{(1,2)} Ulfhild | ^{(2)} **Ubbe** ♕
^{(1)} Henry | ^{(1)} Uffe† | ^{(1,2)} Hunding† | ^{(2)} Thorhild | ^{(2)} Scot
^{(1)} daughter of Uffe | ^{(2)} Ragnar† | ^{(2)} Swanhwid | ^{(2)} sisters of Swanhwid | ^{(2)} Handwan
^{(2)} Thorwald
^{(2,5)} **Frode** ♕ | ^{(2)} daughter of Handwan
^{(2,3)} Hothbrodd† | ^{(2)} **Halfdan** ♕ | ^{(2)} Ro | ^{(2)} Skat
^{(2)} Thora
^{(2,3)} **Helge** ♕ | ^{(2)} **Ro** ♕
^{(2,3)} Athisl† | ^{(2)} Urse
^{(2,3)} King Gewar | ^{(2,3)} **Rolf** Krage ♕† | ^{(2)} Rute | ^{(2)} Bjarke | ^{(2)} Skulde | ^{(2,3)} **Hiartuar** †♕
^{(2,3)} **Hother** †♕ | ^{(3)} Nanna | ^{(3)} Herlek | ^{(3)} Gerit
^{(3)} former King of Britain | ^{(3)} mother of the King of Britain | ^{(3)} a slave | ^{(3)} a bondmaid | ^{(3)} **Rorik** Slyngebond ♕ | ^{(3)} Gerwendil
^{(3,4)} King of Britain | ^{(3,4)} Queen of Britain | ^{(3,4)} Gerutha | ^{(3,4)} Horwendil | ^{(3,4)} Feng
^{(3,4)} foster sister of Amleth | ^{(3,4)} daughter of the King of Britain | ^{(3,4)} Amleth | ^{(4)} Hermutrude, Queen of Scotland | ^{(4)} **Wiglek** ♕
^{(4)} son of Amleth | ^{(4)} **Wermund** ♕ | ^{(4)} Frowin, governor of Sleswik
^{(4)} **Uffe** ♕, aka Olaf the Gentle | ^{(4)} daughter of Frowin | ^{(4)} Ket | ^{(4)} Wig
^{(4)} **Dan** ♕
^{(4)} **Hugleik** ♕
^{(4)} **Frode** the Vigorous ♕
^{(4)} **Dan** ♕
^{(5)} Kraka | ^{(5)} Ragnar | ^{(5)} Brak | ^{(4,5)} **Fridleif** the Swift ♕ | ^{(5)} Hun, King of the Huns | ^{(5)} Hun
^{(5)} Gotar, King of Norway | ^{(5)} Westmar | ^{(5)} Koll | ^{(5)} Gotwar
^{(5)} Roller | ^{(5,6)} Erik† Shrewd-spoken | ^{(5)} Gunwar the Fair | ^{(5)} Alfhild | ^{(5,6)} **Frode** ♕ | ^{(5)} Hanund | ^{(5)} Grep (eldest of three) | ^{(5)} 11 other sons (two named Grep)
^{(6)} Hythin, King of Tellemark | ^{(5)} Alf | ^{(5)} Eyfura | ^{(5)} Arngrim | ^{(6)} Grubb | ^{(6)} **Hiarn** ♕ | ^{(6)} Amund, King of Norway
^{(6)} child of Hythin | ^{(6)} Halfdan† | ^{(5)} 12 sons, including Anganty | ^{(6)} Ane | ^{(6)} Juritha | ^{(6)} **Fridleif** ♕ | ^{(6)} Frogertha
^{(6)} Hanef, King of Saxony | ^{(6)} Swerting, King of Saxony | ^{(6)} Olaf | ^{(6)} **Frode** ♕
^{(6,7)} Siward† | ^{(6)} sons of Swerting | ^{(6)} sister of the sons of Swerting | ^{(6,7)} **Ingild** ♕ | ^{(6)} Helga | ^{(6)} Helge | ^{(6)} Asa
^{(6,7)} Frode | ^{(6,7)} Fridleif | ^{(6,7)} Ingild | ^{(6,7)} **Olaf** ♕ | ^{(7)} Karl, governor of Gothland
^{(7)} Ulfhild | ^{(7)} **Frode** ♕ | ^{(7)} Hather, a chief | ^{(7)} **Harald** ♕ | ^{(7)} Signe
^{(7)} Erik† | ^{(7)} Thorhild | ^{(7)} **Halfdan** Biargramm ♕† | ^{(7)} Harald
^{(7)} Asmund
Kings of Norway

Name spellings are derived from Oliver Elton's 1905 translation, The First Nine Books of the Danish History of Saxo Grammaticus, via Wikisource.
