= List of figures in Germanic heroic legend, I–O =

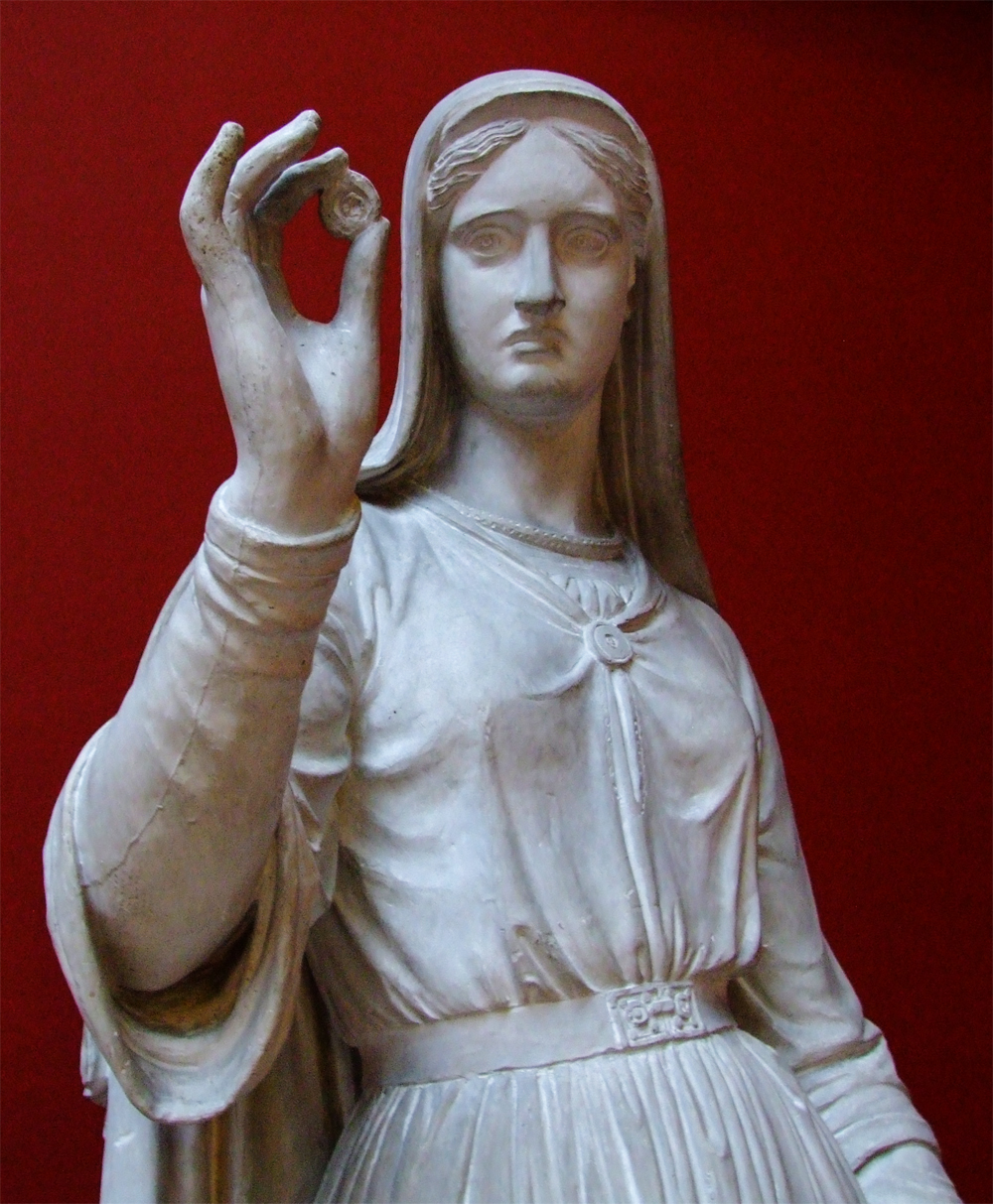
"Ingeborg" (1857) by Herman Wilhelm Bissen.

== I ==
Figure	Names in medieval languages	Historical origin	Name meaning	Relationships	Early and English Attestations	Norse Attestations	German Attestations
Iarizkar	Old Norse: Jarizkárr		For the second element Kárr, see Kara below. For the first element, see Yaroslav the Wise (Jariz-leifr).	In Guðrúnarkviða II, Jarizkárr appears as one of Gudrun's suitors together with Jarisleifr, which probably refers to Yaroslav the Wise who received help from his brother from Eymund who also appears as one of the suitors, Eymóðr. In his translation of Guðrúnarkviða II, Hollander considers the mention out of place and moves it to the notes.		Guðrúnarkviða II	
Ibelin	Middle High German: Ibelîn		The etymology is unknown, but possibly from MHG îwe/îbe ("yew").	The sister of Duke Nitger of Mautern; she helps Dietrich during his imprisonment by informing Hildebrand^{1} of his whereabouts, but also warns her brother of the coming attack.			Virginal
Ibor	Latin: Ibor, Ybor, Iborea, Ebbo		The name means "boar", from PGmc *eburaz ("wild boar").	The Historia Langobardorum tells that Ibor and his brother Aio were the sons of the wise woman Gambara. The two brothers led their people, the Winnili from Scandinavia to Scoringa, where they settled, but the Vandals, led by Ambri and Assi, demanded that the Winili pay tribute to them or face war. Consulting their mother Gambara, they opted for war instead, and sent a messenger to the Vandals that they would rather fight than be slaves. The Winnili settler were few in number, but young and healthy. Gambara address the goddess Frigg (Frēa), and she told her that the Winnili women should but their hair in front of their faces like beards, and stand next to their men. When the god Odin (Godan) saw them in the morning he asked who the "long beards" were, and Frigg prevailed on Odin to give the Winnili victory against the Vandals, and the Winnili were from then on called Lombards ("long beards"). When Aio and Ibor were dead, they were succeeded by Aio's son Agilmund.	Origo Gentis Langobardorum, Historia Langobardorum, Prosper of Aquitaine	Gesta Danorum	
Idmund	Old Norse: Iðmundr		The first element ið is a rare word that seems to refer to "perpetual motion", and the second element is ON mundr ("protector").	In Helgakvíða Hjörvarðssonar, Hjörvard^{4} wanted to marry Sigrlinn, the daughter of king Svafnir of Svavaland, so he sent Atli^{2}, the son of his jarl Idmund, to negotiate with Svafnir.		Helgakvíða Hjörvarðssonar	
Iljas von Russland	Middle High German: Îljas von Riuzen, Old Norse: Ilias		Appears to derive from the Russian heroic figure Ilya Muromets.	Uncle of Ortnit. He helps Ortnit in his question to acquire a bride from the heathen king Machorel; Ortnit is forced to prevent him from killing prisoners, women, and children after combat. In the Þiðreks saga, he is the brother of Oserich.			Ortnit, Þiðreks saga
Ilsan	Middle High German: Ilsân, also Elsân, Elsâm, or Ilsunc		The name is possibly based on PGmc *ali- ("other, strange"), plus a variable suffix.	Hildebrand^{1}'s brother. He was responsible for Dietrich von Bern's brother and Attila and Helche's sons when Witige killed them. In some stories, he is a warrior monk. George Gillespie writes that it's likely that he originally became a monk to escape Dietrich's wrath for the death of the princes.			Dietrichs Flucht, Rabenschlacht, Rosengarten zu Worms, Alpharts Tod
Imd	Old Norse: Imd		From PN *īmiþō. It is the same root as in the giantess names Ímgerðr and Íma, and where íma means "grey stripe".	A giantess. In Helgakvíða Hundingsbana I, during a flyting, Sinfjötli accuses his opponent Gudmund^{2} of having been the daughter of Imd, an event otherwise lost.		Helgakvíða Hundingsbana I	
Immung, Immunch	Latin: Immunc[h]		From the stem *im (found in names such as Immo/Emmo), a hypercoristic form of names beginning with ermana ("universal") or *id (possibly "wealth"). The name is characterized as a dwarf name by the suffix -ung.	The father of the dwarf Hartung.			Ruodlieb
Ingebjorg^{1}	Old Norse: Ingibjǫrg		The first element is from PGmc *Ingwia- but its origin is contested. It may mean belonging to *Ingwaz an unattested Germanic god, but it may also be derived from the ethnonym Ingwianiz. The second element is PGmc *-berʒō or *-burʒō ("helper", "assistant").	The mother of the Saami princess Hvít.		Hrólfs saga kraka	
Ingebjorg^{2}				See Borghild^{2}			
Ingebjorg^{3}			See Ingebjorg^{1}	In Ragnarssona þáttr, the daughter of Harald Klak who married Sigurd Hart and with him had the son Gudthorm^{2} and the daughter Ragnhild.		Ragnarssona þáttr	
Ingeborg	Old Norse: Ingibjǫrg		See Ingebjorg	The daughter of Ingjald (or Yngvi^{1}), the king of Sweden. The infamous berserker Hjörvard^{1} (or Angantýr) son of Arngrím challenged her lover Hjálmar, the king's champion, to a duel (holmgang) on the island of Samsø for her hand. Hjálmar won the duel, but was mortally wounded by the cursed sword Tyrfing. According to Hervarar saga, she committed suicide upon learning of his death, a tradition found in several places in Norse legend and witnessed by Ahmad ibn Fadlan, and it seems to represent an ancient suttee tradition.		Hervarar saga, Orvar-Odd's saga	
Ingeld	Old English: Ingeld, Old Norse: Ingjaldr, Latin: Ingellus, Latin: Hinieldus	Probably originally a historical figure from the western Baltic around 520.	Probably from PG *-geldaz ("payment") with the reinforcing prefix in-, or from the divine name Ingwaz.	His legend was so popular in England that in 797, Alcuin wrote "what has Ingeld to do with Christ?". In Beowulf, Ingeld is the Heaðobard ruler, and the son of Froda, whom the Danes have killed. The Scylding king Hroðgar marries off his daughter Freawaru to him, in the hope of securing peace. However, during the feast, an old Heaðobard warrior notices a sword that a young Danish retainer has and recognizes it as a Heaðobard sword captured in battle, and reminds his people of their defeat. A young man whose father it had belonged to slays the retainer and escapes. After this Ingeld's interest in his young bride, and in peace, are predicted not to last. In the Scandinavian tradition, Gesta Danorum (VI), has a similar account, but the Danes are replaced by the Saxon Swerting and his sons and Ingeld and the old warrior (Starkad) kill them all, and he appears to divorce his wife. The Skjöldunga saga relates that Ingeld rejected his wife, but that she gave him the son Agnarr. Ingeld later killed Halfdan Scylding, who was avenged by his sons Roas (Hrothgar) and Helgo (Halga). In Widsith (lines 45-49), it is told that Ingeld and his Heaðobards attacked the Scylding residence at Heorot burning it down, but that Hroðgar and Hroðulf defeated them and presumably killed Ingeld. In Bjarkamál he is referred to by Bödvar Bjarki as the father of Agnarr that he has killed in battle. Ingeld's family may be mentioned on the Rök runestone: "the line of Ingold was repaid by a wife's sacrifice".	Alcuin, Beowulf, Widsith (lines 45-49)	Gesta Danorum (VI), Bjarkamál, Skjöldunga saga, Rök runestone	
Ingjald	Old Norse: Ingjaldr hinn illráði		For etymology, see Ingeld, above. Secondarily, the Old Norse form Ingjaldr may have been perceived as a contraction of Ingivaldr.	Tolkien calls Ingjald the "most famous of the Yngling kings of Sweden". He was the great-grand-son of king Eadgils of Beowulf. He took over the kingdoms of neighbouring petty kings by inviting them to a feast at Uppsala and burning them to death inside the hall at night. When he was attacked by Ivar Vidfamne, he committed suicide by burning himself to death with all his retinue in his hall at Ræning. He was the father of Åsa^{1} and Olof Trätälja.		Historia Norwegiæ, Ynglinga saga, Hervarar saga, Af Upplendinga Konungum	
Ingjald Olofsson	Old Norse: Ingjaldr Óláfsson		See Ingjald, above.	In the Ynglinga saga, Ingjald is one of the two sons of Olof Trätälja, and the brother of Halfdan Whiteshanks. Ingjald ruled Värmland after his father's death, and was inherited by his brother Halfdan.		Af Upplendinga konungum, Ynglinga saga	
Ingvar Harra	Old Norse: Yngvar Harra		The first element is from PGmc *Ingwia- but its origin is contested. It may mean belonging to *Ingwaz an unattested Germanic god, but it may also be derived from the ethnonym Ingwianiz. The second element -arr can have three different origins: *-harjaʀ ("war chief, warrior"), *-warjaʀ ("defender") or *-ʒaiʀaʀ ("spear").	King of Sweden, and the son of king Eysteinn. He assumed the rule after the interregnum of the sea king Sölvi, and at that time, Sweden was beset by pillaging Danes and easterners. He made peace with the Danes and started pillaging in the east. He fell in mainland Estonia or on Saaremaa and was buried there. He was the father of king Anund.		Historia Norwegiæ, Ynglinga saga	
Ingvar of Fjädrundaland	Old Norse: Yngvarr	Possibly historical.	For the name Ingvar, see above.	As the petty king of Fjädrundaland, he and his two sons Agnarr and Álfr were invited together with a number of other petty kings by the Swedish king Ingjald ill-ruler to a feast at Uppsala, but at night the doors were barred and he hall set on fire, burning everyone inside to death. After this Ingjald expanded his realm. As their names alliterate and are identical to some found in the Yngling dynasty, they may have been members of that dynasty.		Ynglinga saga	
Ingvar (others)				For other figures named Ingvar, se Yngvarr			
Ingvi or Ingvone				See Yngvi			
Innstein and Utstein	Old Norse: Innsteinn ok Útsteinn	They seem to be connected with the royal estate of Utsteinn in Hordaland.	The name element -steinn means "stone", while inn- means "in" and út- means "out". Styrr means "tumult, battle", and in the name Steinarr, -arr can have three different origins: *-harjaʀ ("war chief, warrior"), *-warjaʀ ("defender") or *-ʒaiʀaʀ ("spear").	Innstein and Utsteinn are the sons of Alf^{11} the Old, the jarl of Hordaland, and Gunnlöð. They are both named Steinn, although they in ch. 16 are called Styrr and Steinarr. Innstein gets his name because he always wants to raise a tent on the ship when it rains and sit inside it, while his brother sits outside. Utsteinn joins the sea-king Half^{1} and his warriors. When they are treacherously killed by Asmund, Gunnlöð finds her son Innsteinn dead, but Utsteinn is still alive, so she takes care of him and two of his brothers-in-arms till they are healthy. Utsteinn joins an expedition to avenge Half^{1} led by Hrok the Black. Hrok the Black's brother Hrok the White becomes the father of another Gunnlöð who is the mother of Hromund Gripsson, the hero of Hrómundar saga Grípssonar. Innstein is mentioned in Hyndluljóð as the son of Alf^{8} the Old, and as the father of Ottar, the matter of the lay.		Hálfs saga ok Hálfsrekka, Hyndluljóð	
Iring	Middle High German: Îrinc, Old Norse: Iringr	Not mentioned in historical contemporary sources on his historically attested lord Hermanafrid, potentially derived as a figure from sacral paths used by kings.	Etymology uncertain. Wilhelm Grimm suggested the name came from Epurduring, a name for the Thuringii. Förstemann suggests that the name is from Hiru, see Iron, below.	Vassal of the Thuringian king Hermanafrid, in the Deeds of the Saxons, Theuderic I persuades him to kill Hermanafrid, but Iring afterwards kills Theuderic and then cuts his way out of the hall. In the Nibelungenlied he is a Dane and an exile at Attila's court.			Deeds of the Saxons, Nibelungenlied, Þiðreks saga
Iron	Middle High German: Iram, Old Norse: Iron		Förstemann comments that the element ir- is "unexplainable", but suggests that it was originally Hiru, and the same as ON hjǫrr, OS heru, etc., i.e. from the PGmc root *χeruz ("sword"). Some names may be from Harja (PGmc *χarjaz, "army") and the name Hieronymus.	An earl and son of Artus (king Arthur). He is captured by King Salaman and slain by Aki Aurlungatrausti (see Hache) after having an affair with the latter's wife Bolfriana. The Middle High German form of the name, in connection to Nordian^{2}, is mentioned in a poem by Der Stricker: Iram and Nordian are said to have undertaken a disastrous wisent hunt.			Þiðreks saga
Isung^{1}	Old Norse: Ísungr, Old Swedish Ysung		The Old Norse name has been connected both with Old Norse íss ('ice') and ísarn ('iron'); Förstemann connects the corresponding Old High German form Isunc to both words. The name may be identical with a nickname Ísungr as well as a common noun meaning "head-covering".	The king of Bertangenland and a patron of Sigurd/Siegfried. He invites Dietrich von Bern and eleven companion to fight twelve of his own warriors. He is attacked by King Hertnið and killed by the latter's wife Ostacia in the form of a dragon.			Þiðreks saga
Isung^{2}	Old Norse: Isungr, Old Swedish Ysung		See Isung^{1}	A skilled minstrel and juggler, he accompanies Wildifer on his mission to save Widige (Withga) when the latter is imprisoned. Isung pretends to be Wildifer's master while Wildifer disguises himself as a dancing bear.			Þiðreks saga
Isung^{3}	Old Norse: Ísungr		See Isung^{1}	In Helgakvíða hundingsbana I, line 21, Hodbrodd is called Isung's slayer. No further information is known about this story, although it appears that the audience is expected to know who Isung is.		Helgakvíða hundingsbana I	
Isung's sons				Isung^{1}, king of Bertangaland, has eleven sons. These sons and Sigurd/Siegfried fight against Dietrich and his eleven champions when Dietrich comes to Bertangaland, defeating eight of Dietrich's champions, in an episode similar to combats in the Rosengarten zu Worms, Die Rabenschlacht, and Biterolf und Dietleib.			Þiðreks saga
Ivar the Boneless	Old Norse: Ívarr hinn Beinlausi, Old English: Inwære, Latin: Hinguar, Latin: Iuuar	A historical Viking ruler of York (died 873) and possibly also known as Ímar, Viking ruler of Dublin.	The etymology of Ívarr is not generally agreed upon, but it is probably from PGmc *īwaz ("yew") and -arr which can have three different origins: *-harjaʀ ("war chief, warrior"), *-warjaʀ ("defender") or *-ʒaiʀaʀ ("spear").	Ivar the Boneless was according to Ragnars saga loðbrókar, the son of Ragnar Lodbrok and Aslaug^{1}. He was born with gristle instead of bones, and had to be carried around on a stretcher or a shield, but was handsome and so wise that he may never have had his equal. Consequently, he was his brothers' advisor. When their father had been killed by Ælla of Northumbria, his brothers Björn Ironside and Sigurd Snake-in-the-Eye wanted revenge, and invaded but were defeated. Ivar then approached Ælla and asked for only as much land as could be encircled by an ox's hide, and swore in return never to wage war against him. He then cut the hide in such a thin slice that he could encircle a large stronghold, and in Ragnars saga loðbrókar it was London, and in Ragnarssona þáttr it was York. With his largesse he attracted England's greatest champions and thus made them unavailable for Ælla. When Ivar's brothers invaded England for the second time Ælla was beaten and submitted to the cruel execution blood eagle. The ruse with the hide also appears in Gesta Danorum (IX), and there he ruled England for two years. According to Ragnarssona þáttr he was king of a part of England, and had his sons by a concubine, Yngvar and Husto, torture Edward the martyr to death.	Many sources	Ragnars saga loðbrókar, Ragnarssona þáttr, Krákumál, Ad catalogum regum Sveciæ annotanda, Gesta Danorum (IX)	
Ivar Vidfamne	Old Norse: Ívarr inn víðfaðmi		See Ivar the Boneless for the first name.	As told in Heimskringla and Hervarar saga, he came to Sweden to attack Ingjald ill-ruler (or the Wicked), but the latter burnt himself to death with all his retinue in his hall in Ræning. Ivar then conquered large parts of northern Europe. Ivar is one of the most notable semi-legendary kings of Scandinavia, but the extents of his rule are not possible to verify. His father Halfdan the Valiant is reported to have been the great-grand-son of Hrothgar in Beowulf, and he would have reigned in the second half of the 7th c.		Hervarar saga, Ynglinga saga, Sögubrot af nokkrum fornkonungum, Af Upplendinga Konungum	

== J ==
Figure	Names in medieval languages	Historical origin	Name meaning	Relationships	Early and English Attestations	Norse Attestations	German Attestations
Jonakr	Old Norse: Jónakr		Perhaps from a Slavic jonakŭ meaning "young warrior". Walther Steinhauser and Otto Gschwantler instead reject the Slavic theory and derive the name from Old Norse: jór, PGmc. *ehwaz (horse) and Old Norse: hnakkr, PGmc. hnakkaz (neck). Other suggested Germanic etymologies have been unconvincing.	Gudrun's second husband and the father of Hamdir, Sorli, and Erp. He encourages the wedding of Svanhild and Ermanaric.		Ynglingatal, Guðrúnarhvöt , Hamðismál, Völsunga saga	
Jörmunrekr				See Ermanaric			
Jorund	Old Norse: Jǫrundr, Latin: Iorundus	May be based on a historic 5th c. Swedish king.	PN *Erōwinduz, where the first element *erō- (ON jara) means "battle" and the second element *winduz is an agent noun based on PIE *u̯en- ("to win").	According to the Skjöldunga saga (Bjarkarímur), the Swedish king Jorund and his subordinate Sverting are defeated and subjected by the Danish king Frodo, who also rapes Jorund's daughter who gives him the son Halfdan. Frodo's older son Ingeld marries the daughter of Sverting, but Jorund and Sverting conspire against Frodo, and Sverting and his sons kill him. In the Ynglinga saga, Jorund defeats Haki^{1} and becomes the king of Sweden, like his father Yngvi^{1} before him. During one of his pillaging expeditions, he is captured in the Limfjord by Gylaug, the king of Hålogaland who avenges his father by hanging Jorund, as Jorund and his brother Eric^{2} previously had hanged Gylaug's father. Jorund is probably, like Sveigðir, Domaldi and Agni to be considered one of the sacrificed kings of the Yngling dynasty. He is the father of Aun.		Íslendingabók, Ynglingatal, Historia Norwegiæ, Ynglinga saga, Skjöldunga saga, Bjarkarímur	

== K ==
Figure	Names in medieval languages	Historical origin	Name meaning	Relationships	Early and English Attestations	Norse Attestations	German Attestations
Kara	Old Norse: Kára		Kára is the feminine form of Kárr which means "curly" from PN *kawaraʀ.	According to he Poetic Edda, Helgi and his lover, the Valkyrie Kára, Halfdan's daughter, were Helgi Hundingsbane and Sigrún reborn, who in turn were Helgi Hjörvarðsson and Sváfa reborn. Their story was told in the lost poem Káruljóð, which has partly survived by being used as material for the legendary saga Hrómundar saga Gripssonar. The saga tells that Helgi was in the service of the Haddings, the kings of Sweden. The two Haddings challenged a Danish king named Olaf to battle on the ice of lake Vänern, and as Hrómund was in Olaf's service, Helgi could meet him to avenge his brother Hröngvid. During the fight, Helgi was protected by the magic of Kára who was flying in the form of a swan above him. Accidentally, Helgi cut off her leg as he swung his sword into Hrómund, killing her, after which Hrómund killed Helgi.		Hrómundar saga Gripssonar, Helgakviða Hundingsbana II	
Ket	Latin: Keto	The legend about Offa is probably based on historical inter-tribal rivalries before the Anglo-Saxon settlement of England.	Förstemann derives the personal name Keto from kid ("young goat").	In the Danish accounts, Ket and Wig are the sons of Frowinus, the governor of the region of Schleswig. During a Swedish invasion, their father is killed by the Swedish king Athislus in single combat, after which king Wermund appoints Ket and Wig as successors. To avenge their father they go to Sweden, where they ambush king Athislus and kill him, causing disgrace to their tribe. Their brother-in-law Offa will redeem them by defeating two men in single combat. Wig is mentioned in the Anglo-Saxon chronicle as a descendant of Odin (Wodan) and the son of Freawine (Frowinus).		Gesta Danorum (IV), Brevis historia regum Dacie	
Kimo Scaramundus	Latin: Kimo Scaramundus		The name Kimo is a hypocoristic form of names beginning with the element gim-, which may derive from a root related to ON gim ("fire"). The first element of his epithet or byname Scaramundus is OHG scara ("battle line," "troop"), the second element is PGmc *mundō ("protector").	The nephew of Camalo, he is killed by Walter of Aquitaine.			Waltharius
Kjárr	Old Norse: Kiárr, Old English: Casere	Probably descended from the Roman emperors.	The Norse name most likely descended from Latin Caesar, perhaps via Greek and Gothic.	King of the Valir. Father of the Alruna (Ǫlrún).	Widsith (20, 76)	Atlakviða, Völundarkviða, Skáldskaparmál, Hervarar saga	
Knéfröðr or Knéfraðr	Old Norse: Knéfrǫðr, Old Norse: Knéfraðr or Vingi		The first element in Knéfrǫðr (Knéfraðr) is kné- ("knee"), and for the second element -frǫðr/fraðr, cf. PGmc *fraþaz ("strong, able"). Vingi may be a hypocoristic form of Proto-Norse names like OHG Winigêr and Winigild.	In the Norse tradition, Atli (Attila) invites the Burgundians to his hall by a messenger variously named Knéfrǫðr or Vingi. In the Völsunga saga, Vingi confuses the runes that Gudrun has sent warning the Burgundians not to come. Vingi tells them of the treachery when they reach Attila's hall and the Burgundians kill him.		Atlakviða, Atlamál, Dráp Niflunga, Völsunga saga	
Kostbera	Old Norse: Kostbera		"Bearer of food" in Old Norse.	Högni's wife. She discovers that Gudrun has sent a message in runes warning the Burgundians not to go to Attila and has a dream that predicts that Attila will kill the Burgundians, but Högni ignores it.		Atlamál, Völsunga saga	
Kriemhild				See Gudrun/Kriemhild			
Kudrun	Middle High German: Kûdrûn, in the manuscript Chaudrun, Chutrum.	Not historical.	See Gudrun. Name probably derives from a Low Franconian version of the Norse name.	Daughter of Hilde and Heoden (Hetel), granddaughter of Hagene^{2}. She is betrothed to Herwig von Seeland, but the rejected Norman suitor Hartmut abducts her with the help of his father Ludwig, resulting in Hetel's death. When she refuses to marry Hartmut, she is badly mistreated by Hartmut's mother Gerlind and forced to perform the tasks of a serving girl. When the Normans are defeated and Kudrun rescued, she arranges for marries to secure the peace.			Kudrun
Künhild	Middle High German: Künhilt, Sîmilte		The first element in Künhild, Kün- means "family", from PGmc *kunjan. The second element is *hildjō- "strife, conflict".	Dietleib's sister. She is abducted by the dwarf king Laurin and is rescued by Dietrich von Bern's heroes, including her brother. She intercedes for Laurin's life.			Laurin
Kuperan	Middle High German: Kuperan		The name may be from the name "Cypriân", the name of a heathen king in the epic Salman und Morolf.	A giant who seems to be in the service of the dragon guarding the hoard of the Nibelungs.			Lied vom Hürnen Seyfrid

== L ==
Figure	Names in medieval languages	Historical origin	Name meaning	Relationships	Early and English Attestations	Norse Attestations	German Attestations
Laiamicho	Latin: Laiamicho, Lamicho, Lamissio, Lamisio		According to Malone, the first element was interpreted through folk etymology as Latin lama ("pond"), but laiam- is the original form, which represents a West Germanic *lājan ("to bark"), cf. Gothic laian ("to revile") and Icelandic lá ("to scold"), and so Lājamo probably meant "barker". The various spellings of the last element -icho, -isio and -isio all reflect the same pronunciation in Lombardic (as in German ich), a k-diminutive like the English diminutive -ca and the Icelandic -ki. The name would have meant "little dog".	The Historia Langobardorum tells that a prostitute gave birth to a litter of seven boys who were thrown into a fish pond in order to drown them. King Agilmund, who was passing on his horse, poked the drowning litter with his spear and pulled up a boy that was holding onto the spear. He named him "fish pond man", Lamissio, and the boy became a prominent warrior. One day Agilmund and his troops wanted to cross a river but were stopped by shield-maidens. To settle the dispute Lamissio fought against a shield-maiden while swimming in the river, and Lamissio killed his opponent so the Lombards could pass and settle in the land on the other side of the river.	Origo Gentis Langobardorum, Historia Langobardorum		
Laszínus or Attila	Old Norse: Laszínus, Atli		In one manuscript called Atli (see Attila), but in another one called Laszínus, from Latinus ("Latin"), perhaps because the Huns, like the Romans, were southerners. The original name may not have been preserved.	The king of Húnaland, and the father-in-law of Hildebrand^{1}.		Ásmundar saga kappabana	
Laurin	Middle High German: Laurîn	Folkloric figure, probably originating in South Tyrol.	Possibly from *lūr- (MHG lûren ("to lie in wait"), lûre ("deceiver")) or from a non-IE root *lawa/lauwa- ("stone"), found in Loreley.	Dwarf king and possessor of a rose garden that is attacked by Dietrich von Bern and his companions. After he pretends to make peace with Dietrich but betrays him, he is eventually taken back to Bern (Verona) as a court jester. In one version of Laurin, he converts to Christianity and is restored to his position. In the Heldenbuch-Prosa, a dwarf who appears to be Laurin leads Dietrich out of this word following the final death of all the other heroes in battle. In the poem Wartburgkrieg, Laurin causes Dietrich to disappear, falsely leading people to believe he is dead.			Laurin, unnamed inHeldenbuch-Prosa, but fulfilling a role given to Laurin in the poem Wartburgkrieg.
Liebgart	Middle High German: Liebgart		Lieb- is from leuba- "dear", and -gart from PGmc *ʒard- with means such as "family", "house" and "enclosure"	The wife first of Ortnit and then of Wolfdietrich. Ortnit abducts her from her father Machorel and marries her. After his death, Wolfdietrich marries her once he has killed the dragon that killed Ortnit.			Ortnit, Wolfdietrich
Liudegast and Liudeger	Middle High German: Liudegast and Liudegêr	The brothers may reflect notions of a Saxon-Danish alliance against the Holy Roman Emperor.	Both names begin with Low German liud- ("people, war band"). The second element of "Liudegast" from PGmc *gasti- ("guest"), the second element of "Liudeger" OHG and Old Saxon gêr ("spear").	The kings of the Danes and the Saxons respectively, against whom Siegfried aids the Burgundians in the Nibelungenlied.			Nibelungenlied, Dietrichs Flucht, Rabenschlacht
Lodin	Old Norse: Loðinn		Loðinn means "shaggy", and presumably refers to his repugnant aspect.	In Helgakvíða Hjörvarðssonar, Lothin was a giant who its hero Helgi Hjörvarðsson, proposed as a fit spouse for the giantess Hrimgerth during their flyting. He lived on an otherwise unknown location called "pine island".		Helgakvíða Hjörvarðssonar	
Logi	Old Norse: Logi	Most likely fictive.	The name means "flame", or "marriage".	According to Snorri Sturluson in Ynglinga saga, a Sámi prince who was taken prisoner together with his sister Skjálf by the Swedish king Agne when he went pillaging in Finland (Lapland). Agne killed their father Frosti but Skjálf avenged them by hanging Agne from a tree on their wedding night. Finlay and Faulkes note that the original Ynglingatal stanza says loga dis and that it is interpreted by Snorri as "Logi's sister", referring to Skjálf, but dís usually means "a supernatural female". Others interpret the phrase as the "dís of marriage", and Skjálf is another name for the goddess Freyja (Nafnaþulur 25).		Ynglinga saga, Ynglingatal	
Ludwig von Normandie	Middle High German: Ludewîc von Ormandîe	Forms of the name (cognate to Louis) are used for Frankish/French kings in both German and Norse material.	First element from PGmc *hlōda-, a participle from a root *hlu ("to hear"), probably meaning "famous". The second element is PGmc *wīga-, related to Gothic weihan ("to fight").	King of Normandy, father of Hartmut; he helps his son abduct Kudrun and kills Heoden (Hetel) in a battle when the Heodeningas try to prevent the abduction. Herwig von Seeland, Kudrun's fiancé, beheads him during the fighting when the Normans are finally defeated.			Kudrun, Biterolf und Dietleib
Lyngheid and Lofnheid	Old Norse: Lyngheiðr ok Lofnheiðr		ON lyng means "heather"), while heiðr may mean "heath" or "honour", or in female names "bright, beauty". The first element lofn was the name of a goddess, cf. Gothic lubains ("hope") and OE lufen ("love", "comfort", "joy").	In Reginsmál, Fafnir was killing his father Hreithmar to get all the gold he had got in wergild from the gods for killing his son Otter. Dying Hreithmar called out to his daughters Lyngheid and Lofnheid. Lyngheid answered that few sisters would kill a brother to avenge their father. Hreithmar then called out that if Lyngheid would not bear a son to avenge him, she would have a daughter who would marry and this would result in a man who would avenge him (Gruntvig suggested that this means that either Lyngheid or her daughter married Eylimi, Sigurd's grand-father). She also advised Regin not to claim his share of the gold from his brother Fafnir with a sword.		Reginsmál	
Lyngvi	Old Norse: Lyngvi		From ON lyng ("heather"), from PGmc *lengwa-.	A son of Hunding. His wooing of Sigurd's mother Hjordis is rejected in favor of Sigmund, for which he kills Sigmund with his brothers. Sigurd later kills him and his brothers, by applying blood eagle. The Völsunga saga includes Hjörvard^{3} among his fallen brothers. Norna-Gests þáttr tells that in the first battle against Helgi Hundingsbane, his brothers Eyjolf, Hervard and Hjörvard were slain, but Lyngvi, Alf and Heming escaped to be killed later in battle against Sigurd.		Reginsmál, Völsunga saga, Norna-Gests þáttr	

== M ==
Figure	Names in medieval languages	Historical origin	Name meaning	Relationships	Early and English Attestations	Norse Attestations	German Attestations
Machorel	Middle High German: Machorel	Al-Adil I (Malek-al-adil), Ayyubid Sultan (died 1218).	From Malek-al-adil.	A king in the Levant. The father of Ortnit's wife, whom Ortnit abducts from him. In revenge, he sends a dragon to Ortnit's kingdom that eventually kills him.			Ortnit
Madelger (Studas)	Middle High German: Madelgêr or Adelgêr, Old Norse: Studas		The first element of Madelger is PGmc *maþal ("speech"). The second element is OHG ger ("spear"). Studas comes from OHG stuot, OS stôd ("stud").	The father of Heime^{1} (Háma). In German tradition he appears among Ermanaric's men. In the Þiðreks saga, he is named Studas and operates Brunhild's stud farm of horses.			Þiðreks saga, Dietrichs Flucht, Rabenschlacht, Biterolf und Dietleib, Heldenbuch-Prosa
Mǣðhilde	Old English: Mǣðhild(e)		The first element mǣð may correspond to ON meiða ("to injure", "to spoil"). Malone considers Mǣðhilde to be the original form of the name, and suggests that it became the Scandinavian Magnhild (where magn means "might") by transmission through German, referring to Förstemann according to whom Math-hildis became Maht-hildis, where the first element means "migh". The second element is from PGmc *hildjō- "strife, conflict".	In the Old English poem Deor there is a reference to Mǣðhilde and her lover Geat: "We learned that, [namely] Mæðhild's moans, [they] became numberless, [the moans] of Geat's lady, so that that distressing love robbed her of all sleep". There is a group of medieval Scandinavian ballads called Harpans kraft, where the Icelandic and the Norwegian versions preserve the names of the love couple as Magnhild and Gauti, where Gauti is the Scandinavian form of Geat, Mǣðhilde's lover. In the Scandinavian version, Magnhild dreams nightmares of falling into a nearby river. Gauti builds a strong bridge over the river and takes all possible precautions that she will be safe. However, fate still makes Magnhild fall into it and drown becoming captive of the river's water spirit. Gauti recuperates her by playing on his harp. In the Icelandic version, the ending is tragic and Gauti finds his lover dead, while in the Norwegian the ending is happy, and Malone argues that Deor also has a happy ending and that the laments are those of the water spirit.	Deor	Medieval Scandinavian ballads (Harpans kraft)	
Marpaly	Middle High German: Marpaly		Probably from an Old French name for a heathen princess such as Maraltrie, Maugalie etc.	The daughter of the heathen king Belian, when Wolfdietrich arrives at his castle he allowed Wolfdietrich to spend the night with her before they perform a knife-throwing contest the next day. Marpaly prophesies that Wolfdietrich will win and tries to seduce him, however Wolfdietrich refuses to sleep with her unless she converts. After he kills Belian, she tries in vain to prevent in from leaving by using magic to conjure demons and inclement weather.			Wolfdietrich
Meaca	Old English: Meaca		Müllenhof connected the name to OE (ge)maca ("comrade").	Appears in Widsith, line 23 as a king of the Myrgings. His name appears in a hypocoristic form in place names with the suffix -ingas ("the people of") in Essex, which suggests that the Saxons that settled in the area were Myrgings.	Widsith		
Mearchealf	Old English: Mearchealf		The name may consist of mearh ("horse") and ealf ("elf").	Appears in Widsith, line 23 as a king of the Hundings, but he is unknown from other sources.	Widsith		
Menja	Old Norse: Menja		The name means "slave girl" or "wearer of the necklace".	Grottasǫngr informs that the giantesses Fenja and Menja were sisters and that they were the nieces of the giant Þjazi, and were daughters of two male giants. In the Prose Edda, Snorri tells that the mythical Danish king Fróði had bought them from king Fjölnir in Sweden. He made them grind an enormous mill that produced anything Fróði wanted. However, he never let them rest, so in revenge they produced an army led by a sea-king named Mýsingr who killed Fróði, and ended the era of peace called the Fróði-peace. He ordered them to grind salt and also refused them to rest. In the end they produced so much salt that the ship sank and the sea turned salty.		Grottasǫngr, Skáldskaparmál (40)	
Mergart	Middle High German: Mergart		The first element is mar-, from the PGmc adjective *mērjaz ("famous"), and the second element gard-, from PGmc *ʒarđaz ("house", "family", "court", "yard").	The daughter of Heribrand and sister of Hildebrand^{1}. She is married to Amelung^{1} and is the mother of Wolfhart, Sigestab and Alphart.			Wolfdietrich, Heldenbuch-Prosa
Milias	Old Norse: Milias or Melias	The figure Constantine plays a similar role in the minstrel epic König Rother.	The element mil- could be from PGmc *mili-, a root meaning "to rub, to mill, to grind". A comparable name is the Sicambrian personal name Milo or Melo.	The king of Hunland. Oserich/Osantrix attempts to woo his daughter Oda, but he refuses and she is abducted. He dies in despair when Attila invades his kingdom.			Þiðreks saga
Mime, Mimir				See Regin			
Modthryth	Old English: Þrȳðo, Old English: Mōdþrȳðo, Old English: Fremu, Latin: Drida, Latin: Quendrida		Mōd means "mind", "spirit" and "courage" from PGmc *mōđaz, while Þrȳðo means "force", "power" and "strength", from PGmc *þrūþiz, cf. ON Þrúðr. The compound Mōdþrȳðo is an emendation by Klaeber that many have followed. Others consider þrȳðo to be an abstract noun and reconstruct her name as Fremu ("good").	In Beowulf, she is the queen of Offa of Angel, who her father sent over the sea to marry him, and who is so proud that only her husband may look at her without fearing death or imprisonment. She is reputed to have committed fewer evil deeds after marrying him. In Vita Offae I, Offa of Angel marries a girl who he finds while hunting who is the daughter of the king of York who had escaped her father's attempts at seduction. She bears him two children. The king of York gets revenge by killing the children and leaving the mother to exposure in the woods but they are saved and resurrected by an hermit. In Vita Offae II, Offa of Mercia saves and marries a Drida, a relative of the Frankish king Carolus, that he finds drifting in a boat being punished for a crime. She is then called Quendrida and they have three daughters. Soon Quendrida shows her evil nature and starts conspiring against her husband. She has king Alberht of East Anglia murdered, but is soon murdered by robbers on the same spot.	Beowulf, Vitae duorum Offarum		
Morung	Middle High German: Môrunc		The name likely derived from Latin maurus ("Moor"). The form in Kudrun and Dukus Horant may be a variant of Morolf, a minstrel who compares himself to Horant in the minstrel epic Salmon und Morolf.	A vassal of Hetel (Heoden), he accompanies Horant (Heorrenda) on his quest to woo Hilde (Hildr)^{1}. In Dukus Horant, he is Horant's brother.			Kudrun, Dukus Horant
Mysing	Old Norse: Mýsingr, Latin: Mysinngus	Malone argues that Mýsingr was originally the eponymous ancestor of the Myrgings.	The name seems to be derived from mús ("mouse"), but Malone suggests it is derived from a word, meus, meaning "moor".	In Skáldskaparmál and Grottasöngr, Mysingr is a sea-king who attacked and killed king Fróði, thereby ending the long peace. He stole the mill Grotti and the giantesses Fenja and Menja, and he forced them to grind salt for him until the ship sank and all the salt turned the sea salt. The Skjöldunga saga informs that he killed Fróði (Frodo) through arson. This would have taken place at the same time the Roman emperor Augustus ruled.		Prose Edda (Skáldskaparmál), Grottasöngr, Skjöldunga saga	

== N ==
Figure	Names in medieval languages	Historical origin	Name meaning	Relationships	Early and English Attestations	Norse Attestations	German Attestations
Nere	Middle High German: Nêre		The first use of the name is the Rolandslied of Pfaffe Konrad (12th-c.) where it is used for a Saracen.	The brother of Hildebrand^{1}; in Dietrichs Flucht he dies in the Battle of Bolonje (Bologna).			Nibelungenklage, Wolfdietrich, Dietrichs Flucht, Alpharts Tod
Nibelung^{1}	Middle High German: Nibelunc		Name could originate with the Nibelungids, a Frankish dynasty installed in the conquered Burgundian kingdom in southern Gaul. The etymology is uncertain, possibly named after Nivelles (Gmc *Niuwa-alha "new sanctuary"). The word has been influenced by PGmc *nebula- ("mist, darkness") or *nibila- ("low, deep, dark").	A dwarf or giant, the father variously of the giants Nibelung and Schilbung (Nibelungenlied) or the dwarf Eugel (Lied vom Hürnen Seyfrid). He is the original owner of the Hoard of the Nibelungs and the sword Balmung.			Nibelungenlied, Lied vom Hürnen Seyfrid
Nibelung^{2}	Middle High German: Nibelunc		See Nibelung^{1}.	The son of Nibelung^{1}. He and his brother Schilbung fight over their father's inheritance and ask for Siegfried's help, but grow angry when he divides the treasure evenly. Siegfried then kills them both.			Nibelungenlied
Niflung	Old Norse: Niflungr		The name means "son of mist", or see Nibelung^{1}, above.	In the Völsunga saga, the son of Hagen/Högni^{1}. He helped Gudrun kill Atli (Attila) while he was sleeping.		Völsunga saga	
Nitger^{1}	Middle High German: Nîtgêr, possibly Middle High German: Nettinger		From PGmc *nīþ- ("envy, spite") and *ʒaizaz ("spear").	A duke who rules over twelve giants at Mautern. He captures Dietrich von Bern and is eventually forced to free him once Dietrich defeats the giants and becomes Dietrich's vassal. He may be the same person as Nettinger, the father of Ecke and Fasolt.			Virginal, possibly Eckenlied
Nitger^{2}	Middle High German: Nîtgêr		See Nitger^{1}	One of Dietrich's vassals, Giselher is reported to have killed him in the Nibelungenklage. He is the father of Sigelint^{3}			Nibelungenklage, Alpharts Tod, Biterolf und Dietleib
Nithhad	Old English: Nīðhād, Old Norse: Níðuðr or Niðungr (Þiðreks saga), Middle High German: Hertnît		PGmc *nīþ- ("hate, rage") is found in all versions of the name. Old English hād means "state, condition; Níðuðr is an approximation of the English name. The name probably originally meant "ferocious warrior." Niðungr might mean villain. The first element in the Middle High German name is hart ("hard"). The name is probably of West Germanic origin, as no other Norse name contains the element *nīþ-, but it is common in the south.	In Völundarkviða, king of the Njárar, in Sweden, but in Þiðreks saga, a ruler in Jutland. Nithhad hamstrings Wayland the smith and keeps him prisoner. In Þiðreks saga, this is because Wayland had killed his court smith. As revenge Wayland kills the king's sons and impregnates his daughter Beodohild, then escapes.	Deor	Völundarkviða	Þiðreks saga, Heldenbuch-Prosa
Nordian^{1}	Old Norse: Nordian		The element Nord means "north", while the ending -îân is frequent in the names of characters who are heathens, giants, and dwarfs.	The son and successor of king Vilkinus of the Veleti. He has four giant sons, including Avæntroð (Ebenrot). Hertnið of Rus' attacks and conquers him, then makes him chief of part of Scandinavia (in one version, Seeland).			Þiðreks saga
Nordian^{2}	Old Norse: Nordian		See Nordian^{1}	The huntsman of Earl Iron of Brandinaborg. He refuses to abandon his lord and is captured by King Salamon. He is released to procure a ransom for Earl Iron, and announces the news of Iron's death once he is slain by Aki^{3}.			Þiðreks saga
Nordri	Old English: Norðri		The name means "the Northern".	The 12th Skjöldunga saga asserts that Wealtheow, Hrothgar's queen, was English, while the probably 14th c. Hrólfs saga kraka says that she (Ögn) was the daughter of king Norðri of Northumberland, a name which Newton considers to be misunderstanding of Norðfolc (Norfolk in East Anglia.		Hrólfs saga kraka and Skjöldunga saga mention a wife of Hrothgar who was an Anglo-Saxon princess.	
Norna-Gest	Old Norse: Norna-Gestr		The name means "guest of the Norns"	In the manner of Odin, Norna-Guest visits king Olaf Tryggvasson and tells him about his 300 year long life. During his long life he has witnessed many legendary characters and their adventures, such as those of the Völsung/Nibelung cycle. His long life is due to having been visited by the Norns at his birth, and the youngest of them declared that he would die when a candle had burnt out. The oldest Norn then snuffed it out in order to preserve it.The king convinces Norna-Guest to accept baptism and to have the candle lit and burnt down, freeing Norna-Guest from the suffering of a long life.		Norna-Gests þáttr	
Norprecht	Middle High German: Norpreht	Probably related to similar ferryman stories in other heroic legends.	The first element can mean "north" (nord), "ship" (ON nór), or it can be derived from a Celtic root (as in Noricum). The second element preht means "bright", from PGmc *berχtaz.	A ferryman over the Rhine. He demands a hand and foot as payment for ferrying Dietrich von Bern's heroes across and is defeated by Ilsan.			Rosengarten zu Worms
Nuodung	Middle High German: Nuodunc, Old Norse: Nauðingr		The name is probably derived from PGmc *nauði- ("need, distress"), with the German form developing from a contracted form of the diphthong with a nasalized long "o" to OHG "uo/ua".	The son of Rüdiger; he mentioned as having been killed by Witege in the Nibelungenlied, but appears as a supporting character in other epics. In the Þiðreks saga, he is instead the brother of Rüdiger's wife. He is killed by Witige at the battle of Gronsport.			Nibelungenlied, Þiðreks saga

== O ==
Figure	Names in medieval languages	Historical origin	Name meaning	Relationships	Early and English Attestations	Norse Attestations	German Attestations
Oda^{3}	Old Norse: Oda		See Ute^{2}.	The daughter of King Milias of Hunland, she is wooed by King Oserich/Osantrix. Though she desires to marry him, her father refuses, and she allows herself to be abducted. She is the mother of Helche (Erka) with Osantrix.			Þiðreks saga
Oddrun	Old Norse: Oddrún		The first element Oddr means "spearhead" or "spear", from PGmc *uzđaz, and the second is PGmc *rūnō- ("secret").	Attila's sister. She and Gunnar fall in love, although Attila has forbidden this, and this leads to the downfall of both Gunnar and Attila's families.		Oddrúnargrátr, Völsunga saga	
Odilia^{1}	Old Norse: Odilia		The name is derived from PGmc *ōþalan/ōþilan (hereditary property, home place, inheritance), OHG uodil, OE oðil, possibly influenced by PGmc *auda (wealth).	The wife of Sibeche (Sifka), Ermanaric's counsellor, Ermanaric rapes her, prompting Sibeche to plot his lord's destruction. Later, Sifka convinces his wife to accuse the Harlungen of raping her, causing Ermanaric to kill them.			Þiðreks saga, Heldenbuch-Prosa (unnamed)
Odilia^{2}	Old Norse: Odilia		See Odilia^{1}	The wife of Dietmar (Themarr) and mother of Dietrich von Bern, she is the daughter of Else^{3} (Elsungr), from whom Dietmar's ancestor Samson had originally conquered Bern.			Þiðreks saga
Odoacer	Old High German: Ôtacher, possibly Old English: Ēadwacer	Historical barbarian king of Italy Odoacer, c. 431-493.	First element PGmc *auda- ("wealth"), second element PGmc *wakar ("guard").	In the Annals of Quedlinburg, Ermanaric's evil counsellor (the role of Sibeche). In the Hildebrandslied, Dietrich von Bern's adversary who has forced him into exile.	Possibly in Wulf and Eadwacer.		Hildebrandslied, Annals of Quedlinburg
Offa of Angel	Old English: Offa, Latin: Uffo	Offa's story is probably based on historical inter-tribal rivalries before the Anglo-Saxon settlement of England.	Possibly from a root related to Gothic ufjō ("abundance"), or a Low German word related to ON ubbi ("wild").	Probably a king of the Angels and son of Wermund who stayed silent and inactive until he became thirty, when his father's kingdom is threatened. He then defeats an opponent in a duel.	Widsith (lines 35-39), Beowulf (lines 1948–62), Vitae duorum Offarum (or Legend of St Albans), Mercian Genealogy in A. S. Chron. (year 755), and other Chronicles.	Gesta Danorum, Brevis historia regum Dacie	
Ogmund	Old Norse: Ǫgmundr		The first element is from PGmc aʒ meaning "(spear)point" or "worry, fear". The second element is mundr from PN *munduʀ meaning "protector".	In Ragnars saga loðbrókar, a man called Ögmund the Dane anchored with five ships at Munarvágr on the coast of Samsø. They found a tall wooden idol (40 ells tall) overgrown with moss, and wondered who had erected the god. The idol then started reciting a poem about having been erected and sacrificed to by the sons of Ragnar Lodbrok.		Ragnars saga loðbrókar	
Ögn^{1}	Old Norse: Ǫgn		The word ǫgn means "chaff, husk" and the genitive form is agnar. As a female name it may be a back-formation of the male name Agnarr (with an unrelated etymology).	See Wealhtheow, for the character in Hrólfs saga kraka.			
Ögn^{2} Álfasprengi	Old Norse: Ǫgn Álfasprengi		For the name, see Ögn^{1}. In her cognomen Álfasprengi, Álf- means "elf", a race of supernatural subterranean beings, and -sprengi means "bursting".	Ögn was betrothed to Starkad Ala-warrior but was abducted by Hergrímr Halftroll. Before being found by Starkad, she bore Hergrímr a son named Grímr. Starkad challenged Hergrímr to holmgang and as he had eight arms, he wielded four swords at the same time and killed Hergrímr. However, rather than returning to Starkad she committed suicide by stabbing herself.		Hervarar saga (U-version)	
Ohthere	Old English: Ōhthere, Old Norse: Óttarr vendilkráka		PN: Ōhtaharjaz or Ōhtuharjaz, where the first element probably means "fear" and the second element "war chief" or "warrior".	When the Geatish king Hrethel died, the sons of Ongentheow, Ohthere and his brother Onela, pillaged among the Geats, in Beowulf. In Norse sources, he is the son of Egil^{2} and died fighting the jarls Vott and Fasti at a Danish location named Vendel or Vendsyssel, but which may be the Swedish location, Vendel.	Beowulf	Historia Norwegiæ, Ynglinga saga, Íslendingabók	
Olaf Geirstad-Alf	Old Norse: Ólafr Geirstaðaálfr		The first element of Óláfr is from PN *anuʀ ("ancestor") and the second element is from PN *laibaʀ ("remnant", "heir")	Olaf succeeded his father Gudrød the Hunter, and he was both tall and handsome and a great warrior. When his father Gudrød still was alive, he lost Vingulmark because it was taken by king Alfgeir of Álfheimr, who made his son Gandalf its king. Alfgeir and Gandalf also took most of Romerike. King Eysteinn the Great of the Upplands had a son named Högni who took control of Hedmark, Toten and Hadeland. Gudrød also lost Värmland which started paying taxes to the king of Sweden. When Gudrød died, Olaf was twenty and he shared what remained of the kingdom (Vestfold) with his brother Halfdan the Black. Olaf lived at Geirstaðir and died from a pain in his leg, and was buried in a mound there. Geirstaðir may have been Gjerstad and the mound where he was buried may have been Gokstad Mound, with the Gokstad ship as the man who was buried there suffered from grave Rheumatoid arthritis in his leg.		Íslendingabók, Ynglingatal, Ynglinga saga, Af Upplendinga konungum, Historia Norwegiæ, Þáttr Ólafs Geirstaða álfs	
Olaf the Keen-Eyed	Old Norse: Óláfr inn skygni		See Olaf Geirstad-Alf.	King of Nerike, and in Ynglinga saga married his daughter Alof^{2} to the Geatish king Algaut (son of Gautrek), and their daughter Gauthild married the Swedish king Ingjald ill-ruler. In Gautrek's saga he is a wealthy king and a mighty warrior who musters the forces of Nerike to support his friend king Vikar of Oppland against king Frithjof of Telemark.		Gautrek's saga, Ynglinga saga, Af Upplendinga Konungum	
Olof Björnsson	Old Norse: Óláfr Bjǫrnsson		See Olaf Geirstad-Alf	Olf was the son of king Björn Eriksson and the brother and co-ruler of Eric the Victorious. Olof was the father of Styrbjörn the Strong who fought Eric the Victorious at the Battle of the Fýrisvellir.		Hervarar saga, Haralds saga Hárfagra, Styrbjarnar þáttr Svíakappa.	
Olof Trätälja	Old Norse: Óláfr trételgja		See Olaf Geirstad-Alf.	When his father Ingjald burned himself to death with all his retinue to escape the wrath of Ivar Vidfamne, Olof was apparently with his foster-father Bóvi in Västergötland because he "went up" to Nerike. However, the Swedes did not let him stay there, so he moved west with his followers to the land north of lake Vänern, where they cleared land and laid the foundation of Värmland. The Swedes then scornfully called him "woodcutter". He married Solveig/Solva of Solør in Norway and had the sons Ingjald and Halfdan. After having received many Swedish refugees, there was a famine and to avert the famine, the Swedes sacrificed him for good harvest by burning him to death.		Ynglinga saga, Historia Norwegiæ, Af Upplendinga Konungum	
Olof, Oluf				For female figures by this name, see Alof.			
Onela	Old English: Onela, Old Norse: Áli, Latin: Alo	Beowulf is generally considered to be based on historic people and events.	PN: *Anula, a diminutive form with -l- suffix of *anuz ("ancestor"), or from a name with this element, such as *Anuwinduz, a traditional name among Swedish kings (Anund, Anund of Uppsala, Anund Jacob).	In Beowulf, he is a Swedish king of the royal dynasty, and the brother of Eadgils, involved against him in the Battle on the Ice of Lake Vänern. In the later Scandinavian sources he is moved to Norway, due to a confusion between the Swedish Uppland (the Swedish heartland) and the Norwegian Oppland. In the Skjöldunga saga, the Norwegian king of Oppland is also mentioned (Alo) as the opponent of Eadgils (Adillus), but there is also an earlier king Alo of Oppland, whose daughter Hilda was kidnapped by Fridleifus II and became the mother of Alo the strong, who may also be based on Onela.	Beowulf	Ynglinga saga, Skáldskaparmál (Kálfsvísa), Skjöldunga saga	
Ongentheow	Old English: Ongenþēow, Old Norse: Eigil	Beowulf is generally considered to be based on historic people and events.	The name is probably from PN *Angan(a)thewar, where the second element means "servant", but the first element is obscure. The name has been interpreted as meaning "opposite of a servant" or "favoured servant". The ON form may have changed from the hypocoristic form *Angila to *Agilaʀ to Egill.	In Beowulf, the Swedish king is slain by fighting the two brothers Eofor ("boar") and Wulf^{1}, and Eofor is rewarded for this with Hygelac's only daughter. In Ynglinga saga he corresponds to Egil^{2}, who fights against a thrall Tunni (PN *Tunþā from *tunþuz, which means "tooth" or "tusk"), but is killed by the horns of a bull. As the Ynglingatal stanza instead talks of him being killed by a sword and talks of the "reddening of the boar's snout" and the word for "bull", farri, meant "boar" (i.e. Eofor) in East Norse, the two traditions may have the same origin. In both traditions, he is succeeded by Ohthere.	Beowulf	Ynglinga saga (called Egil^{2})	
Orendel				See Aurvandill.			
Orkise	Middle High German: Orkîse	Possibly derived from Orco, an Alpine forest demon.	Probably of Romance origin.	A cannibalistic heathen who exacts tribute from the dwarf queen Virginal.			Virginal
Orkning	Old Norse: Orkningr		The first element orkn means "seal", while the suffix could mean "descendant" or "person associated with".	According to Atlamál and Völsunga saga, a great warrior and the brother of Kostbera, and the brother-in-law of the heroes Högni^{2}, Gunnar and Gutthorm^{1}. He accompanies Högni and Gunnar, and Högni's sons Snaevar and Solar, to their fateful visit at the fortress of Atli (Attila), who was married to Högni's and Gunnar's sister Gudrun.		Atlamál (stanza 28), Völsunga saga (38)	
Ormar	Old Norse: Ormarr, Old English: Wyrmhere		PN: *wurma-harjaz ("snake warrior"). The snake had a protective symbolism in Germanic traditions, and was known in that role as OE cofgodas ("house protector"). Ormar served as the guardian of the Gothic eastern frontier.	The foster father of the shieldmaiden Hervor, daughter of Angantyr. The Goths fight against the Huns led by Hlöd and Humli; Ormar escapes to tell Angantyr of the attack. He probably also appears in Widsith, line 119 as one of the two Gothic (Hræde) princes who fought the Huns in the Vistula Woods. The other prince was Wulfhere.	Widsith	Hervarar saga	
Orte and Scharpfe/Erphe	Middle High German: Orte and Scharpfe or Erphe; Old Norse: Ortvin and Erpr		For the etymology of "Erpr/Erphe", see Erpr^{1}. The name Orte is from OHG ort- ("spearhead") (from PGmc *uzđaz). Scharpfe means "sharp" in Middle High German. For Ortvin, see Ortwin von Metz.	The sons of Attila with Helche/Erka. They are killed by Witige while accompanying Dietrich von Bern on campaign in Italy at battle at Ravenna (Die Rabenschlacht) or Gronsport (Þiðreks saga).			Rabenschlacht, Dietrichs Flucht, Þiðreks saga
Ortlieb	Middle High German: Ortliep, Old Norse: Aldrian		The first element of Ortliep is from OHG ort- ("spearhead") (from PGmc *uzđaz). For Aldrian, see Aldrian^{1}.	The son of Etzel (Attila) with Kriemhild/Grimhild. In the Nibelungenlied, he is decapitated by Hagen/Högni^{1} when Dancwart announces that he and the Burgundian squires have been attacked by Blödelin (Bleda). This causes fighting to break out in the hall. In the Þiðreks saga and Heldenbuch-Prosa, Kriemhild/Grimhild deliberately provokes Hagen/Högni^{1} by having the child slap him.			Nibelungenlied, Þiðreks saga, Heldenbuch-Prosa
Ortnit	Middle High German: Ortnît or Otnît, Old Norse: Hertnið	Not historical.	First element OHG ort- ("spearhead") (from PGmc *uzđaz), sometimes ot- ("wealth"); the Old Norse version, a translation of a North German form, suggests a first element hart- ("hard"). The second element is PGmc "*nīþ-" (hate, anger).	Predecessor of Wolfdietrich as king of Lombardy. He is the son of the dwarf Alberich. With the help of Alberich and his uncle Iljas von Russland, he sets out to seek the hand of the daughter of the heathen king Machorel, whom he tricks and whose daughter he abducted. Machorel pretends to be reconciled to the marriage, but secretly sends dragon eggs to Lombardy. The sleeping Ortnit is carried off by one of the hatched dragons and devoured by her babies. Dietrich von Bern later acquires the same invincible set of armor Ortnit wore via Ecke.			Ortnit, Dietrichs Flucht, Þiðreks saga
Ortrun	Middle High German: Ortrûn		See Oddrun.	The daughter of king Ludwig of Normandy and brother of Hartmut. When peace is made between the Normans and the Heodeningas, she marries Kudrun's brother Ortwin.			Kudrun
Ortwin^{1} von Metz	Middle High German: Ortwîn von Metzen		First element OHG ort- ("spearhead"), from PGmc *uzđaz. The second element OHG wini ("friend").	Steward of the Burgundian kings in Worms and Hagen's nephew. He disappears in the second half of the poem. In Walther und Hildegund Volker tells Walther he must avoid Metz, suggesting that Ortwin was hostile to him. It's possibly that Walter slays Ortwin, as he would correspond to Patavrid, the name of Hagen's nephew slain in the Waltharius.			Nibelungenlied, Biterolf und Dietleib, Dietrichs Flucht, Rabenschlacht, probably Walther und Hildegund
Ortwin^{2}	Middle High German: Ortwîn		See Ortwin^{1} for an etymology.	The son of Heoden (Hetel) and Hilde (Hildr) and brother of Kudrun. He tries unsuccessfully to stop the Norman abduction of his sister and later leads the expedition that rescues her with her fiancé Herwig. In the peace, he marries the Norman king's daughter Ortrun.			Kudrun
Örvar-Oddr	Old Norse: Ǫrvar-Oddr		Oddr means "spearhead" or "spear", from PGmc *uzđaz. Ǫrvar is the genitive form of ON ǫr meaning "arrow", so Ǫrvar-Oddr means "arrow head". He liked arrows as a child and as an adult he had inherited three magical arrows.	Orvar-Odd is the son of Grim Shaggy-Cheek and the grand-son of Kettil Trout from Halogaland, and the two have their own sagas. As a child it is prophesied that he will live 300 years but die at his parents' home due to his horse Faxi. He kills the horse and buries it deeply, and leaves his home intending never to return with arrows that his father has given him. He travels to Bjarmaland, he fights giants, and several Viking warlords, but the Swedish hero Hjalmar proves to be his equal. Together they fight the duel on Samsø, where Hjalmar dies, and he has to bring Hjalmar back to Uppsala and his beloved Ingeborg. He fights corsairs in the Mediterranean, bathes in the Jordan River, and becomes king of the Huns after having defeated a rebellious tributary king and married the Hunnish king's daughter Silkesif. He longs for home and returns but is bitten by a snake that crawls out of Faxi's skull.		Hervarar saga, Orvar-Odd's saga, Gesta Danorum	
Oserich	Middle High German: Ôserîch, Old Norse: Osanctrix		First component PGmc *ans- ("god") via Low German ôs-, second PGmc *rīk- ("ruler, powerful"). The Norse form in the Þiðreks saga may reflect a Low German *Ôsantrîk.	Father of Helche. In the Þiðreks saga, a Wilzen (Veleti) and brother of Valdemarr of Rus'. In the Þiðreks saga, he abducts his wife from Hunaland; Attila later abducts Helche from him, and he is eventually killed fighting the Huns.			Biterolf und Dietleib, Þiðreks saga
Osid^{1}				See Buðli^{1}			
Osid^{2}	Old Norse: Osiðr		Ósiðr with a long first vowel means "bad habit", from ON ó- ("un-"), and siðr ("custom, habit, manner").	The nephew of Attila, he is raised at Attila's court. He aids Rotholf in his attempt to woo Helche (Erka) on behalf of Attila. He is a great warrior in the subsequent war with Helche's father Oserich (Osantrix). He also serves to bring Attila's suit for the hand of Grimhild. He defeats Gunnar/Gunther in the final battle at Attila's hall.			Þiðreks saga
Oslaf	Old English: Ōslāf, Old English: Ordlāf, Latin: Oddleifus		The name Ōslāf is from PN *Ansulaibaz, and the first element is *Ansuz which means "pagan god) and the second element is *-laibaz which means "descendant" or "heir". The first elements Ord- (Ord-lāf) and Odd (Odd-leifus) are from *Uzdaz (OE Ord and ON Oddr) which means the "sharp point (of a weapon)".	Oslaf appears in the Finnsburg Fragment (called Ordlaf) and in Beowulf, as one of Hengest's men. The second conflict with the Frisians starts because he and Guthlaf publicly express their shame to Hengest. He may have been the brother of Guthlaf and Hunlaf, and the three appear in a list of six or seven sons of a Danish king Leifus in the Skjöldunga saga.	Finnsburg Fragment, Beowulf	Skjöldunga saga	
Ospirin				See Helche			
Ostacia	Old Norse: Ostacia		Karl Müllenhoff suggested an origin in a warrior woman (palenitsa) of Russian heroic legend named Nastasia. Richard Heinzel compares other MHG instances of foreign names beginning with "n" losing it and initial "a" becoming "o".	The wife of king Hertnið and a sorceress. When Hertnið attacks King Isung, Ostacia transforms herself into a dragon and kills the hero Dietleib von Steier and king Isung, but is wounded so badly that she dies.		Þiðreks saga	
Meaca	Old English: Meaca		Müllenhof connected the name to OE (ge)maca ("comrade").	Appears in Widsith, line 23 as a king of the Myrgings. His name appears in a hypocoristic form in place names with the suffix -ingas ("the people of") in Essex, which suggests that the Saxons that settled in the area were Myrgings.	Widsith		
Oswine	Old English: Ōswine		The first element Ōs- is from PGmc *ans ("pagan god") and the second element -win is from PGmc *weniz ("friend").	Appears in Widsith, line 26 as a king of the Eowan (Öland?). He was formerly identified with Oslaf of Beowulf.	Widsith		
Óttarr				For the Swedish king Ottar Vendelkråka, see Ohthere.			

== Sources ==
- Acker, Paul (2007). "Part I. "Fragments of Danish History" (Skjöldunga saga)". ANQ: A Quarterly Journal of Short Articles, Notes and Reviews. 20 (3): 3–9. doi:10.3200/ANQQ.20.3.3-9. S2CID 162198516.
- Anderson, Carl Edlund (1999). Formation and Resolution of Ideological Contrast in the Early History of Scandinavia (PDF) (Thesis). University of Cambridge.
- Anderson, Carl Edlund (2016). "Scyld Scyldinga: Intercultural Innovation at the Interface of West and North Germanic". Neophilologus. 100 (3): 461–476. doi:10.1007/s11061-015-9468-y. S2CID 162985589.
- Ayres, Henry Morgan (1917). "The Tragedy of Hengest in "Beowulf"". The Journal of English and Germanic Philology. 16 (2): 282–295. JSTOR 27700808.
- Bellows, Henry Adams (1923). The Poetic Edda. New York; The American-Scandinavian Foundation.
- Benati, Chiara (2009). "Faroese Oral Tradition and the Icelandic Saga: the Case of the Ásmund Cycle". Brathair. 9 (1): 3–21.
- Bosworth, J; Northcote Toller, T (1898). An Anglo-Saxon Dictionary. Oxford Clarendon Press.
- Bullough, Donald A. (1993). "What has Ingeld to do with Lindisfarne?". Anglo-Saxon England. 22: 93–125. doi:10.1017/S0263675100004336. JSTOR 44510906. S2CID 162750464.
- Byock, Jesse (1990). The Saga of the Volsungs, The Norse Epic of Sigurd the Dragon Slayer. Berkeley, Los Angeles, London: University of California Press. ISBN 978-0-520-23285-3.
- Byock, Jesse (1999). The Saga of King Hrolf Kraki. Penguin Classics. ISBN 014043593X.
- Stories and Ballads of the Far Past. Translated by Chadwick, Nora Kershaw. Cambridge at the University Press. 1921.
- Chambers, Robert W. (1921). Beowulf. Cambridge : The University press.
- Clarke, M. G. (1911). Sidelights on Teutonic History During the Migration Period, being Studies of Beowulf and Other Old English Poems. Cambridge University Press.
- Cleasby, Richard; Vigfússon, Gudbrand (1874). An Icelandic-English dictionary. Oxford Clarendon Press.
- Detter, Ferdinand (1891). Zwei Fornaldarsögur. Halle A.S. Max Niemeyer.
- Ellis, Hilda Roderick (1968). "The Road to Hel, a Study of the Conception of the Dead in Old Norse Literature". American Anthropologist. 46 (3). Greenwood Press Publishers, New York: 408–409. doi:10.1525/AA.1944.46.3.02A00210. S2CID 160666598.
- The Saga of the Volsungs (PDF). Translated by Finch, R. G. London and Edinburgh: Nelson. 1965.
- Finlay, Alison (2010). "The Saga of Ásmundr, Killer of Champions". In Martin, Arnold; Finlay, Alison (eds.). Making History, Essays on the Fornaldarsögur. Viking Society for Northern Research, University College, London. pp. 119–139. ISBN 978-0-903521-84-0.
- Heimskringla (PDF). Vol. 1. Translated by Finlay, Alison; Faulkes, Anthony. Viking Society for Northern Research, University College London. 2016. ISBN 978-0-903521-86-4.
- Fish Pastoor, Jennifer (2016). "Good to Think With": Women and Exempla in Four Medieval and Renaissance English Texts (Thesis). University of Arkansas, Fayetteville.
- Förstemann, Ernst (1900). Altdeutsches Namenbuch, Band 1: Personennamen (2 ed.). Bonn: P. Hanstein’s Verlag.
- Peters, Edward, ed. (1974). Paul the Deacon: History of the Lombards. Translated by Foulke, William Dudley. Philadelphia: University of Pennsylvania Press. ISBN 0-8122-1079-4.
- Friis-Jensen, Karsten, ed. (2015). Saxo Grammaticus Gesta Danorum, The History of the Danes. Vol. 1. Translated by Fisher, Peter. Oxford University Press. ISBN 978-0-19-82052-34.
- Frank, R. (2002). "Ongendus". In Müller, R. (ed.). Reallexikon der Germanischen Altertumskunde. Vol. 22. New York/Berlin: de Gruyter. ISBN 9783110173512.
- Gentry, Francis G.; McConnell, Winder; Müller, Ulrich; Wunderlich, Werner, eds. (2011) [2002]. The Nibelungen Tradition. An Encyclopedia. New York, Abingdon: Routledge. ISBN 978-0-8153-1785-2.
- Gillespie, George T. (1973). Catalogue of Persons Named in German Heroic Literature, 700-1600: Including Named Animals and Objects and Ethnic Names. Oxford: Oxford University. ISBN 978-0-19-815718-2.
- Gschwantler, Otto (1971). "Zum Namen der Rosomonen und an. Jónakr". Die Sprache. 17 (2): 164–176.
- Harris, Joseph (2016). "Grottasǫngr". In Pulsiano, Philip; Wolf, Kirsten (eds.). Medieval Scandinavia, an Encyclopedia. New York: Routledge Revivals. pp. 244–245. ISBN 978-1-315-16132-7.
- Haupt, Waldemar (1914). Zur niederdeutschen Dietrichsage: Untersuchungen. Mayer und Müller.
- Haymes, Edward R.; Samples, Susan T. (1996). Heroic legends of the North: an introduction to the Nibelung and Dietrich cycles. New York: Garland. ISBN 0815300336.
- Higham, N.J. (1995). An English Empire: Bede and the Early Anglo-Saxon Kings. Manchester and New York: Manchester University Press. ISBN 0719044235.
- Heusler, Andreas (1910). "Heldennamen in mehrfacher lautgestalt". Zeitschrift für deutsches Altertum. 52 (1/2): 97–107. JSTOR 20652404.
- The Poetic Edda. Translated by Hollander, Lee M. Texas University Press. 1928.
- Hollander, Lee Milton (1936). Old Norse Poems: The Most Important Non-Skaldic Verse Not Included in the Poetic Edda. Columbia University Press.
- Jochens, Jenny (1996). Mazo Karras, Ruth; Peters, Edward (eds.). Old Norse Images of Women. Philadelphia: University of Pennsylvania Press. ISBN 0-8122-3358-1.
- De Gamle Eddadigte. Translated by Jónsson, Finnur. G. E. C. Gats forlag, København. 1932.
- Jiriczek, Otto Luitpold (1898). Deutsche Heldensagen, Band 1. Strasbourg: Karl Trübner. ISBN 9783112176429.
- Jones, Gwyn (1969). A History of the Vikings. Oxford University Press.
- Kaufmann, Hennig (1968). Ergänzungsband zu Ernst Förstemann: Personennamen. Wilhelm Fink.
- Kightley, Michael R. (2016). "The Brothers of Beowulf : Fraternal Tensions and the Reticent Style". ELH. 83 (2): 407–429. doi:10.1353/elh.2016.0015. S2CID 164186249.
- McKinnell, John (2005). Meeting the Other in Norse Myth and Legend. D.S. Brewer, Cambridge. ISBN 1843840421.
- Klaeber, Friedrich (2008). Fulk, R.D.; Bjork, Robert E.; Niles, John D. (eds.). Klaeber's Beowulf and The Fight at Finnsburg. University of Toronto Press. pp. 274–277. ISBN 978-0-8020-9843-6.
- Krause, Arnulf (2010). Reclams Lexikon der germanischen Mythologie und Heldensage. Reclam. ISBN 978-3-15-010778-2.
- Lexer, Matthias (1872–1878). Mittelhochdeutsches Handwörterbuch (3 vols.). Hirzel.
- Lienert, Elisabeth (2015). Mittelhochdeutsche Heldenepik. Berlin: Erich Schmidt. ISBN 978-3-503-15573-6.
- Malone, Kemp (1926). "Agelmund and Lamicho". The American Journal of Philology. 47 (7): 319–346. doi:10.2307/289994. JSTOR 289994.
- Malone, Kemp (1930). "Ingeld". Modern Philology. 27 (3): 257–276. doi:10.1086/387833. S2CID 224833211.
- Malone, Kemp (1933). Deor. London: Methuen & Co lmt.
- Malone, Kemp (1962). Widsith. Copenhagen: Roskilde and Bagger.
- Nedoma, Robert (1999). "Die Runeninschrift auf der Gürtelschnalle von Pforzen–ein Zeugnis der germanischen Heldensage". In Bammesberger, Alfred (ed.). Pforzen und Bergakker neue Untersuchungen zu Runeninschriften. Vandenhoeck & Ruprecht. pp. 98–109.
- Neidorf, Leonard (2018a). "Beowulf as Pre-National Epic: Ethnocentrism in the Poem and its Criticism". ELH. 85 (4): 847–875. doi:10.1353/elh.2018.0031. S2CID 165792664.
- McTurk, Rory W. (2006). "Kings and Kingship in Viking Northumbria" (PDF). In McKinnell, John S.; Ashurst, David; Kick, Donata (eds.). The Fantastic in Old Norse Icelandic Literature, Preprint Papers of the 13th International Saga Conference, Durham and York 6th-12th August 2006. Vol. 2. pp. 681–688.
- Miller, Clarence H. (2007). "Fragments of Danish History". ANQ: A Quarterly Journal of Short Articles, Notes and Reviews. 20 (3): 9–33. doi:10.3200/ANQQ.20.3.9-22. S2CID 161363696.
- Neidorf, Leonard (2018b). "Wealhtheow and Her Name: Etymology, Characterization, and Textual Criticism". Neophilologus. 102 (1): 75–89. doi:10.1007/s11061-017-9538-4. S2CID 165875310.
- Nerman, Birger (1919). "Kung Agne och hans död på Agnefit". Fornvännen.
- Nerman, Birger (1925). Svenska rikets uppkomst. Stockholm: Generalstabens litografiska anstalt.
- Newton, Sam (1993). The Origins of Beowulf and the Pre-Viking Kingdom of East Anglia. Cambridge University Press. ISBN 9780859914727.
- Noreen, Adolf (1914). "Sigurd Ring". In Westrin, Th. (ed.). Nordisk Familjebok. Vol. 20 (2 ed.). pp. 981–982.
- Orchard, Andy (1997). Dictionary of Norse Myth and Legend. Cassel. ISBN 0-304-34520-2.
- Orel, Vladimir E. (2003). A Handbook of Germanic Etymology. Brill. ISBN 978-90-04-12875-0.
- Osborn, Marijane (1999). ""The Wealth They Left Us": Two Women Author Themselves Through Others' Lives in Beowulf". Philological Quarterly. 78 (1–2): 49–76.
- Peterson, Lena (2004). Lexikon över urnordiska personnamn. Uppsala: Institutet för språk och folkminnen.
- Peterson, Lena (2007). Nordiskt runnamnslexikon. Uppsala: Institutet för språk och folkminnen.
- Pritsak, Omeljan (1981). The origin of Rus'. Harvard University Press. pp. 188–225.
- Regebro, Margareta (2009). Ney, Agneta; Williams, Henrik; Charpentier Ljungqvist, Fredrik (eds.). "The women and Óðinn". Á austrvega, Saga and East Scandinavia. 2. Gävle: Gävle University Press: 802–896. ISBN 978-91-978329-0-8.
- Roggen, Vibeke (2006). "Old Norse Saga Versus Neo-Latin History Writing: Some Aspects of the Style in Torfaeus' Historia Rerum Norvegicarum (1711)". Humanistica Lovaniensia, Journal of Neo-Latin Studies. LV: 183–194. ISBN 9789058675712. ISSN 0774-2908.
- von See, Klaus; La Farge, Beatrice; et al. (2004). Kommentar zu den Liedern der Edda 4: Heldenlieder Helgakviða Hundingsbana I, Helgakviða Hiǫrvarðssonar, Helgakviða Hundingsbana II. Universitätsverlag Winter.
- Simek, Rudolf (1993). Dictionary of Northern Mythology. Translated by Hall; Angela. D. S. Brewer. ISBN 0-85991-369-4.
- The Saga of King Heidrek the Wise (PDF). Translated by Tolkien, Christopher. 1960.
- Uecker, Heiko (1972). Germanische Heldensage. Stuttgart: Metzler. ISBN 3476101061.
- de Vries, Jan (1970). Altgermanische Religionsgeschichte, Bd.2, Die Götter, Vorstellungen über den Kosmos, Der Untergang des Heidentums. de Gruyter, Berlin. ISBN 978-3110028072.
- de Vries, Jan (1962). Altnordisches Etymologisches Worterbuch (2000 ed.). Brill. ISBN 90-04-05436-7.
- The Sagas of Ragnar Lodbrok. Translated by Waggoner, Ben. New Haven: Troth Publications. 2009.
- Wessén, Elias (1952). Wessén, Elias; Helgason, Jón; Knudsen, Trygve; Skautrup, Peter (eds.). Ynglingsaga. Svenska bokförlaget Norstedts, Stockholm; Ejnar Munksgaard, København; Dreyers forlag, Oslo.
- Westrin, Th. (1910a). "Ivar Benlös". In Westrin, Th. (ed.). Nordisk Familjebok. Vol. 12 (2 ed.). p. 173.
- Westrin, Th. (1910b). "Jorund". In Westrin, Th. (ed.). Nordisk Familjebok. Vol. 13 (2 ed.). p. 173.
- Westrin, Th. (1910c). "Insten och Utsten". In Westrin, Th. (ed.). Nordisk Familjebok. Vol. 13 (2 ed.). p. 736.
