= Skræp =

Mythical sword of the Danish king Wermund

Skræp was a strong and well-forged sword that belonged to the Danish king Wermund according to Saxo Grammaticus', Gesta Danorum. Wermund may actually have been a king of Angles. Saxo tells that king Wermund had a son, Uffo/Uffe, that was called "the meek" ("den spage" in Danish) as he had no interest in warrior ideals and living and never spoke. So that no other might carry Skræp, and as his son was not worthy, king Wermund buried it rather than pass it on to his son.

A king from Saxony, south of Angel, demanded that Wermund give up his kingdom or fight two Saxon warriors in a duel. As Wermund was now old and blind, he considered giving in, but Uffe offered to fight the two Saxons, one of them being a son of the Saxon king. Wermund resisted for a while but eventually allowed Uffe to fight for Denmark. Uffe was given a good sword for testing, but that sword immediately broke. Another sword was given to Uffe who also broke that. Wermund had Skræp dug up but forbade Uffe from testing it for fear that it might also break.

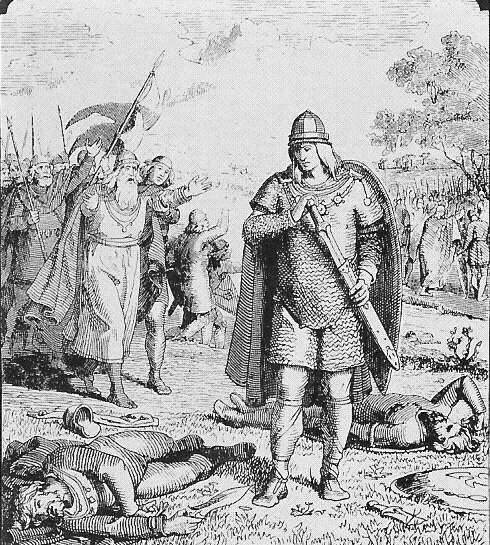
Wermund runs to embrace his victorious son Offa. Illustration by the Danish Lorenz Frølich in a 19th-century book.

On the day of the duel Uffe readied himself. The king's shirt of mail had to be cut open on the side as Uffe was too large to wear it. The duel was to take place on an island in the Eider River. King Wermund, who could not see, had a chair set up at a bridge nearby, where he could listen to the fight. He secretly moved his chair closer to the edge of the bridge so that he might drown himself when Uffe, as expected, lost.

The fight began, one against two. Suddenly Wermund heard a certain noise. He said: That was the sound of Skræp! Where did Uffe hit? and moved his chair back a little. Shortly after Skræp made noise again again and both Saxons lay dead, Uffe having saved Denmark.

Saxo describes Wermund as a king of Denmark but he probably was a king from Angel, if he even is based on a historical person. Angel is a small land between then Saxony and Jutland. Saxo might have borrowed a myth and a hero from a neighbouring land and added him to the glourious acts of the Danes.
