= Creoda of Mercia =

6th-century Anglo-Saxon king, perhaps of Mercia

Creoda
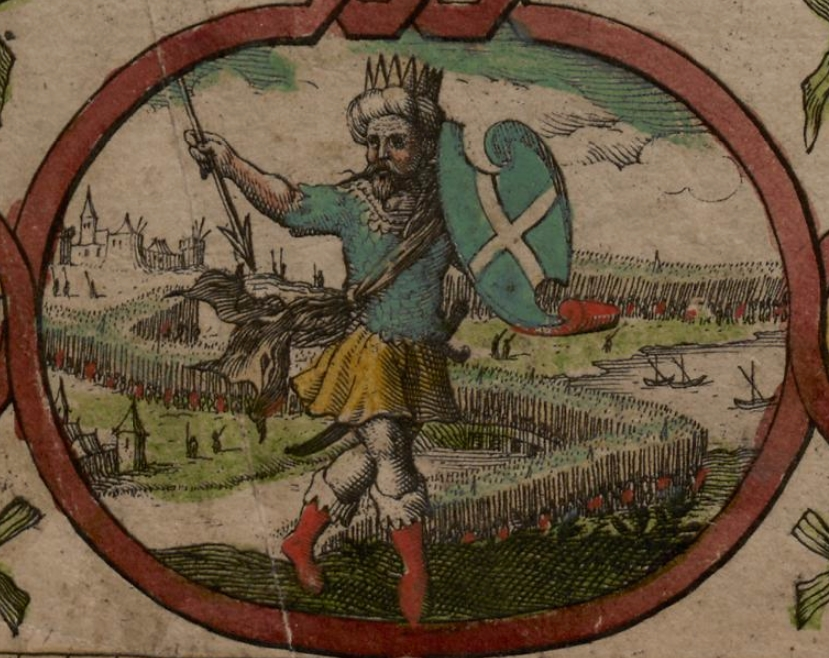
- Imaginary depiction from the 1611 Saxon Heptarchy

King of Mercia
- Reign: c. 585 – 593 AD?
- Predecessor: Cynewald
- Successor: Pybba
- Died: c. 593 AD
- Issue: Pybba
- House: Icelingas
- Father: Cynewald

Creoda (Cryda or Crida, 6th century) may have been one of the first kings of the Anglo-Saxon kingdom of Mercia, ruling toward the end of the 6th century.

Although he is mentioned in a pedigree found in the Anglo-Saxon Chronicle, Creoda is not given the title of king. His existence is disputed by some scholars. Barbara Yorke wrote:

Although it is possible that some kind of regnal list could be the source of the information (though the Worcester lists begin with Penda), these entries could be nothing more than intelligent guesswork based on names derived from Bede and the genealogy of Æthelred, while the dates seem to be influenced by an entry in the Anglo-Saxon Chronicle for the death of a West Saxon Creoda...The surviving sources allow us to say with confidence little more than that the kingdom of Mercia was in existence by the end of the sixth century.

Yorke's sentiment is shared by Professor of Medieval History Nicholas Brooks, who wrote:

Despite Professor Davies's tentative advocacy of the historicity of this material, it cannot be said that it is yet clear that what lies behind these scattered entries in the works of Henry of Huntingdon, Roger of Wendover and Matthew Paris is anything more important than some inventive conjectures by an English monk, perhaps as late as the early twelfth century, on the basis of the names available in Bede, the Mercian royal genealogy and the Anglo-Saxon Chronicle. On such an interpretation it would not be surprising that they should more or less fit the fragments of information that we have on the early history of Mercia; for the compiler of these entries may have had access to the same sources as are available to us.

The suggestion that Creoda was a king of Mercia is to be found in the Historia Anglorum, which was written by Henry of Huntingdon in the first half of the 12th century. Creoda's presumed death was reported by Henry of Huntingdon as occurring in 593, but appears to be based on a confusion, because in that year the death of a man called Crida is specified, but the context suggests that the dying man was West Saxon and not Mercian.

Creoda is recorded by the Mercian pedigree in the Anglian collection as having been the son of Cynewald and the great-grandson of Icel, the eponymous ancestor of his family, the Iclingas.

== See also ==
- Kings of Mercia family tree

== Notes ==
Preceded by Cynewald	King of Mercia c. 585 – 593 AD?	Succeeded by Pybba
