= Eomer =

Eomer is either:

- a legendary king of the Angles (?–489 AD), see Eomer of Anglia; or
- a character in The Lord of the Rings, see Éomer
