= Icel =

Icel may refer to:

- İçel, former name of Mersin Province, Turkey
- Icel of Mercia (fl. 510–535), an early king of Mercia
- International Commission on English in the Liturgy (ICEL)
