= Eadgils (disambiguation) =

Eadgils is a Germanic name composed of auða meaning "wealth" and gīslaz meaning "arrow shaft". It can refer to:

- Eadgils, a semi-legendary king of Sweden.
- Eadgils of the Myrgings who appears in the Anglo-Saxon poem Widsith and the Danish chronicle Gesta Danorum.
- Aldgils (or Aldegisl; Eadgils) who was a Frisian dux or king, father of Redbad, King of the Frisians.
