= Cynewald =

King of Mercia

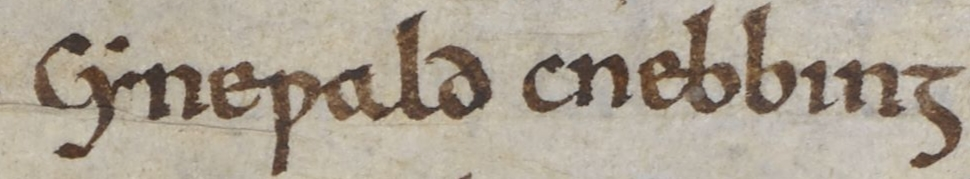
- Cynewald's name (spelled with the letter wynn) in the Anglo-Saxon Chronicle

King of Mercia
- Reign: c. 554 – c. 584
- Predecessor: Cnebba
- Successor: Creoda
- Died: probably c. 584
- Issue: Creoda

Cynewald was king of Mercia from c. 554 till c. 584. He was the son of Cnebba and the father of Creoda.

Preceded by Cnebba	King of Mercia c. 545 – c. 580	Succeeded by Creoda
