= Kings of the Angles =

Legendary lists of English monarchs

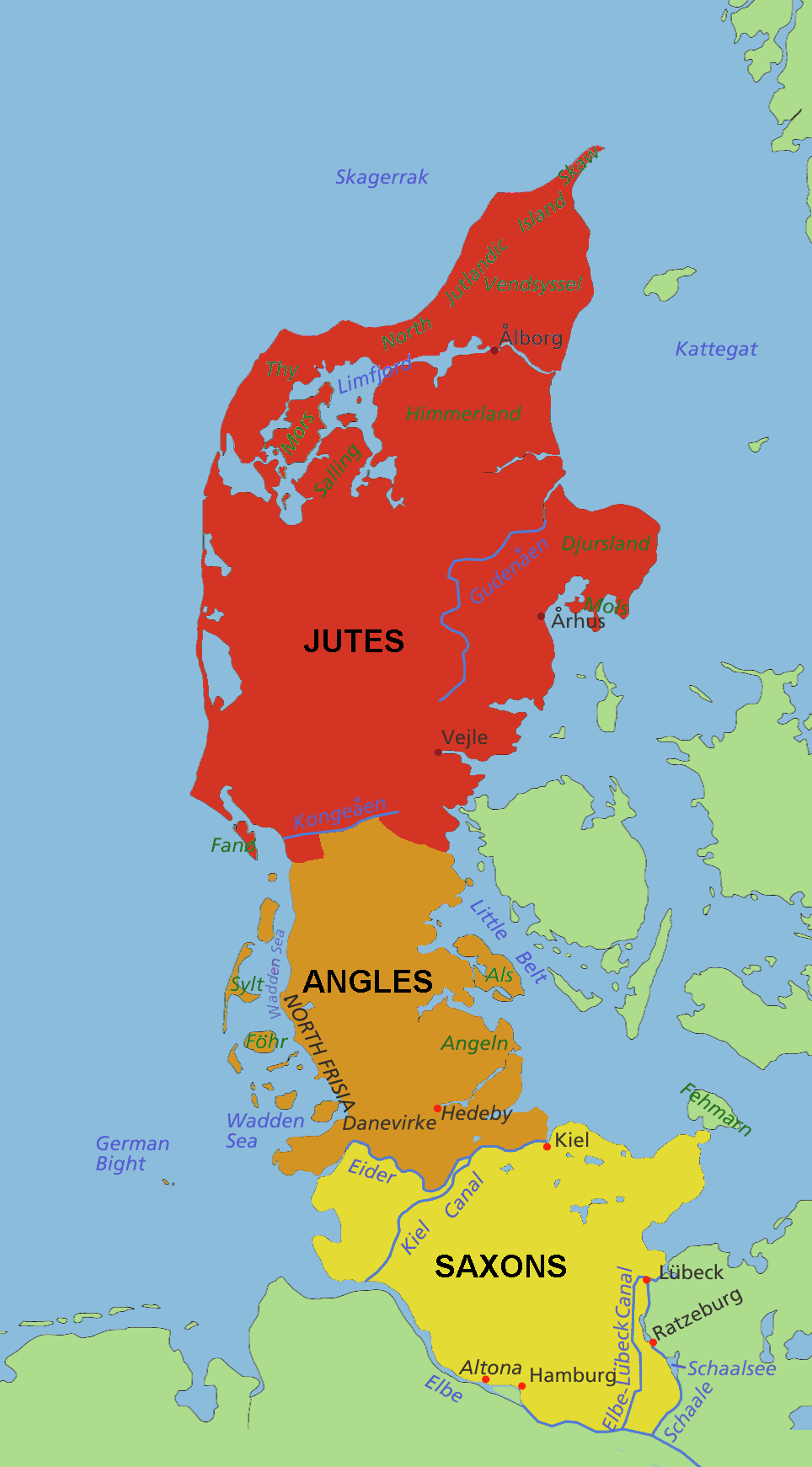
Location of the Angles, Saxons and Jutes before their migrations to Britain.

The Angles were a dominant Germanic tribe in the Anglo-Saxon settlement of Britain, and gave their name to the English, England and to the region of East Anglia. Originally from Angeln, present-day Schleswig-Holstein, a legendary list of their kings has been preserved in the heroic poems Widsith and Beowulf, and the Anglo-Saxon Chronicle.

== Legendary kings of the Angles ==
According to Anglo-Saxon legends recounted in Widsith and other sources such as Æthelweard (Chronicon), their earliest named ancestor was a culture-hero named Sceaf, who was washed ashore as a child in an empty boat, bearing a sheaf of corn. This is said to have occurred on an island named Scani or Scandza (Scania), and according to William of Malmesbury (Gesta regum Anglorum) he was later chosen as King of the Angles, reigning from Schleswig. His descendants became known as Scefings, or more usually Scyldings (after Sceldwea).

The Anglo-Saxon Chronicle derives the royal lines of the Heptarchy from a common ancestor, Woden, a euhemerized version of the Germanic deity, and said to be a descendant of the aforementioned Sceaf. The senior line of this genealogy was that of Mercia, descended from the rulers of the Angles.

The historical Anglo-Saxon settlement of Britain took place during the 5th to 6th centuries. As historical records only set in the later 7th century, after Christianisation, reliable information on the royal genealogies only extend to what was then in living memory, to the early 7th century. Bede (Historia ecclesiastica gentis Anglorum), writing in the early 8th century, has reliable information on the 7th century, but is silent on the 6th. The genealogies extending into the 6th or even 5th century and thence to Woden are now regarded as fabrications of the later Anglo-Saxon period.

The genealogies as presented in the Anglo-Saxon Chronicle incorporate various Germanic heroes of legend, such as Wihtlæg, who defeated and killed Amleth, King of the Jutes. Under Wermund the Angles' fortress at Schleswig is said to have been captured by a branch of the Saxons known as the Myrgings, but was retaken by Offa about whom many tales were told (and who is usually referred to as Offa of Angel to distinguish him from his supposed descendant Offa of Mercia). The legends give Offa as bride a daughter of Freawine, governor of Schleswig, and upon becoming king he is said to have secured the Angles' southern border with the Saxons along the River Eider.

Like Offa, Freawine is made a descendant of Woden, and father of Wig, whose names were intruded into the pedigree of the kings of Bernicia when it was transferred to that of the kings of Wessex (ancestors of the kings of England). Wihtlæg, Wermund and Offa also appear in a long list of legendary Danish kings given by Saxo Grammaticus (Gesta Danorum). All other sources name them as kings of the Angles, though according to Matthew Paris (Vitae duorum Offarum) Offa and his line personally ruled over the West Angles, implying that other branches of the tribe had their own subordinate rulers (Offa is described in Beowulf as ruling an 'empire'). Whilst Offa's line went on to found the Kingdom of Mercia, these putative cadet lines may eventually have engendered the ruling dynasties of East Anglia, Deira and possibly Bernicia. As for the other Anglo-Saxon kingdoms, the kings of Lindsey appear to have been an offshoot of the Mercian line; those of Wessex claimed descent from the aforementioned Freawine, though their subjects were Saxons; those of Essex and Sussex were Saxon; and those of Kent were Jutish.

The genealogy connecting the Icling dynasty of the earliest kings of Mercia with Woden consists of at least five generations in Angeln:

1. Wihtlæg son, grandson or great-grandson of Woden,
2. Wermund son of Wihtlæg,
3. Offa son of Wermund,
4. Angeltheow son of Offa,
5. Eomer son of Angeltheow
6. Icel son of Eomer, participated in the invasion of Britain.

=== Gesta Danorum ===
Some of these names have parallels in the Gesta Danorum by Saxo Grammaticus.

- Wihtlæg (as Wiglecus). Wihtlæg married Nanna. Deposed Fiallar, King of Scania and defeated and killed Amleth, King of the Jutes.
- Wermund (as Wermundus). After a long reign, Wermund suffered an invasion by Eadgils of the Myrgings (fl. c. 370) who slew Freawine (as Frowin), governor of Schleswig.
- Offa of Angel (as Uffa). Offa married a daughter of Freawine. Regarded as a simpleton in youth, Offa fought the Saxons at Rendsburg on an island in the River Eider, thereby securing his southern border with them.

=== Eomer ===
Eomer (Ēomǣr) is the son of Angeltheow in the genealogy of the Anglo-Saxon Chronicle, but in Beowulf he is the son of Offa and grandson of Wermund (v. 1958–1963):

...forþam Offa wæs geofum and guðum gar-cene man, wide geweorðod; wisdome heold eðel sinne, þonon Eomær woc hæleðum to helpe, Heminges mæg, nefa Garmundes, niða cræftig.	...Hence Offa was praised for his fighting and feeing by far-off men, the spear-bold warrior; wisely he ruled over his empire. Eomer woke to him, help of heroes, Hemming's kinsman, Grandson of Garmund, grim in war.(Gummere's translation)

The name of Eomer was used for a character in J. R. R. Tolkien's The Lord of the Rings. Tolkien based many of the names of Rohan on Mercian examples.

== See also ==
- Angul (mythology) - a mythological ancestor of the Angles and Danes who ruled without using the title of king
- Mercia
- List of monarchs of Mercia
- Kings of Mercia family tree
