= Cnebba =

King of Mercia

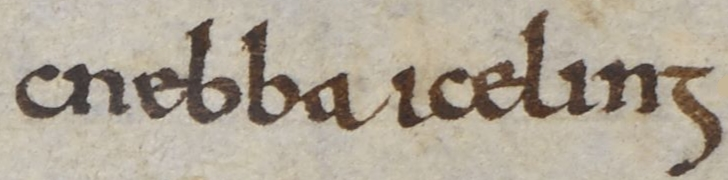
- Cnebba's name in the Anglo-Saxon Chronicle

King of Mercia
- Reign: c. 535 – c. 554
- Predecessor: Icel
- Successor: Cynewald
- Died: c. 554
- Issue: Cynewald

Cnebba was king of Mercia from c. 535 – c. 545.

Cnebba was the only son of Icel of Mercia. He had a son called Cynewald who succeeded him as king and reigned from c. 554 – c. 584, according to the Anglo Saxon Chronicle

It has been suggested that the village of Knebworth was named after Cnebba as Ickleton is suggested to be named after Icel of Mercia.

Preceded by Icel	King of Mercia c. 535 – c. 554	Succeeded by Cynewald
