= Myrging =

Historical people of Saxon origin

The Myrgings were a clan and people of Saxon origin who, together with their king Eadgils, are only mentioned in the Old English poem Widsith. They are mentioned as the people of the scop Widsith. They appear to have been the neighbours of the Angles and Offa of Angel, who was involved in a war against them. Perhaps they were a dynasty or clan competing for power with Offa over the rule of the Angles, though Offa slew two Myrging princes, probably the sons of Eadgils (not to be confused with the Swedish king Eadgils); this Eadgils was later killed by Ket and Wig, the sons of Freawine, a governor of Schleswig who challenged Eadgils to combat while he was pillaging in the Angle lands. Freawine was killed in combat and the Myrgings may then have overrun Schleswig, as they are said to have settled or had holdings at Schleswig, though they were eventually defeated by Offa, who extended the boundary with them to Fifeldor.

Although the Myrgings only appear in the Old English poem Widsith and not in any other source, there is enough evidence to say that the Myrgings vanished leaving no other trace: if a rival clan, they were assimilated into the surrounding Angles; and if non-Angles conquered by Offa, who was said to have won a great Kingdom, very likely that of the conquered Myrgings, they seem to have been assimilated under his son Angeltheow, who abolished the title of King of the Myrgings.

The Myrgings lived south of Angeln near the Eider (river) and according to some sources near Schleswig which was the center of the Angles. They were descended from Saxons who probably had settled in that area a few centuries earlier and probably merged with another tribe to form the Myrgings. Kemp Malone, an American etymologist writing in 1944, suggested that the word "Myrging" means "Mire Dweller" or "Mire-District Dweller"; he also suggested that the name points to a miry or marshy habitat for the tribe and that the With-Myrgings were a sub-tribe of Myrgings who expanded across the Eider into Schleswig. Malone claimed that the With-Myrgings lived in the valley of the Vidå river and that they were the ones at war with Offa of Angel. He also said that the With-Myrgings joined the Angles on their migration to Britain.

== Kings of the Myrgings ==
Widsith lists two kings of the Myrgings. So the following list of the kings is what has been listed in Widsith, with hypothetical dates, and including that on Eadgils' death the Myrgings were conquered by Offa of Angel, who installed himself as their king. When he died in 456, his son Angeltheow abolished the kingdom and unified the Myrgings under one ruler. After this the Myrgings disappeared.

Name	Dates	Notes
Meaca of the Myrgings	early-mid 5th century	killed in battle fighting against the Mofdings.
Eadgils of the Myrgings	mid-5th century	killed by Ket and Wig.
Offa of Angel	mid-5th century	Kingdom conquered by Offa of Angel.
Offa of Angel	dies in 456	Monarch and kingdom Abolished by Angeltheow.
