= Ingjald Olofsson =

Semi-legendary king in Sweden

Ingjald Olofsson was the son of Olof Trätälja and became the king of Värmland after his father's death, according to legend. When Ingjald died, his brother Halfdan Hvitbeinn made Värmland part of his kingdom.
