= Offa of Angel =

Legendary king of the Angels

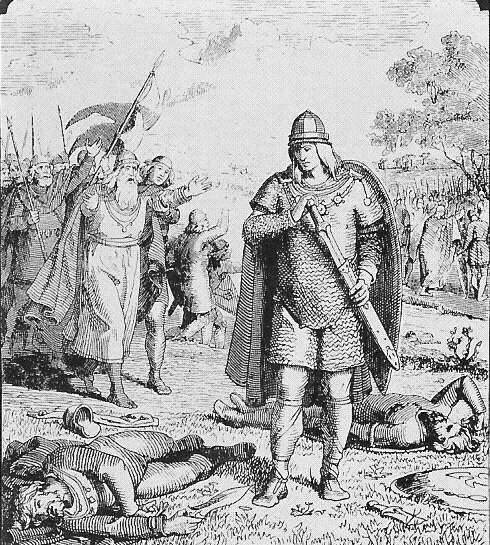
Wermund runs to embrace his victorious son Offa. Illustration by the Danish Lorenz Frølich in a 19th-century book.

Offa is a semi-legendary king of the Angles in the genealogy of the kings of Mercia presented in the Anglo-Saxon Chronicle. He is the son of Wermund and the father of Angeltheow. His name is also mentioned in the Old English poem Widsith. He has been identified with Uffo (also Uffe, Uffi of Jutland), a legendary Danish king in the Gesta Danorum by Saxo Grammaticus, and the Gesta Danorum på danskæ.

== Name ==
The name Offa and its variants are thought to originate as a hypocoristic (nickname) form of the kind of two-element Germanic personal names common in the early medieval Germanic-speaking world. But what the original name was is unclear. Suggestions include that it was derived from a hypothetical Germanic adjective root *ub-, meaning "hostile"; a hypocorism of the "wolf" element of a name such as Old English Æðelwulf; or a hypocorism of a two-element name such as Old English Ōsfriþ or Germanic *Anulaibaz (which became the common Old Norse name Óláfr). It has also been suggested that Offa was an entirely meaningless lall-name.

== History ==
The Old English poem Widsith (8th century) refers briefly to his victorious single combat, a story which is related at length by the 12th-century Danish historians Saxo and Sven Aggesen.

Offa is also mentioned in the Annales Ryenses, Vita Offae Primi and Vitae duorum Offarum.

According to Widsith and the Danish sources, Offa successfully conquered the Myrgings, possibly a clan of Saxon origin, and incorporated their land into Angle or Danish lands, by slaying two Myrging princes in single combat and installing himself as their king.

It is possible that the Offa mentioned in Beowulf (lines 1949 and 1957) and married to Modþryð, a lady of murderous disposition, is the same person.

== Legend ==
Offa's name in Beowulf

In the narrative of Saxo, Uffi is said to have been dumb or silent during his early years. His aged and blind father, King Wermund believed him to be a simpleton and in order to preserve his son's position as king had him marry the daughter of Freawine (a neighbouring warlord/king) so that Freawine would assist Uffi when he became king. However, the plans did not come to pass, as Freawine was killed by a Myrging warlord called Eadgils. Wermund subsequently raised Freawine's sons Ket and Wig as his own. The two would eventually cause great dishonour to the Angles when they ambushed Eadgils in a forest as he walked alone and slew him.

The surrounding peoples began to mock the Angles, accusing them of cowardice and dishonour. Eventually the neighbouring Saxons decided that Wermund was too weak to resist their requests for him to surrender his kingdom, and they sent their emissaries to Wermund's court. There they proceeded to mock the blind man, prompting Wermund to challenge their king to a duel — but the king stated that he would not fight a blind man. It was then that Uffi regained his speech, and revealed that his silence had been caused by the great dishonour involved in Eadgil's death. He promptly challenged the prince of the Saxons and one of his champions to a duel in order to regain the honour of the Angles.

Uffi's combat took place at Rendsburg on an island in the Eider River at Fifeldore/Monster-Gate, and Uffi succeeded in killing both his opponents.

A somewhat corrupt version of the same story is preserved in the 13th-century Vitae duorum Offarum, where, however, the scene is transferred to England.

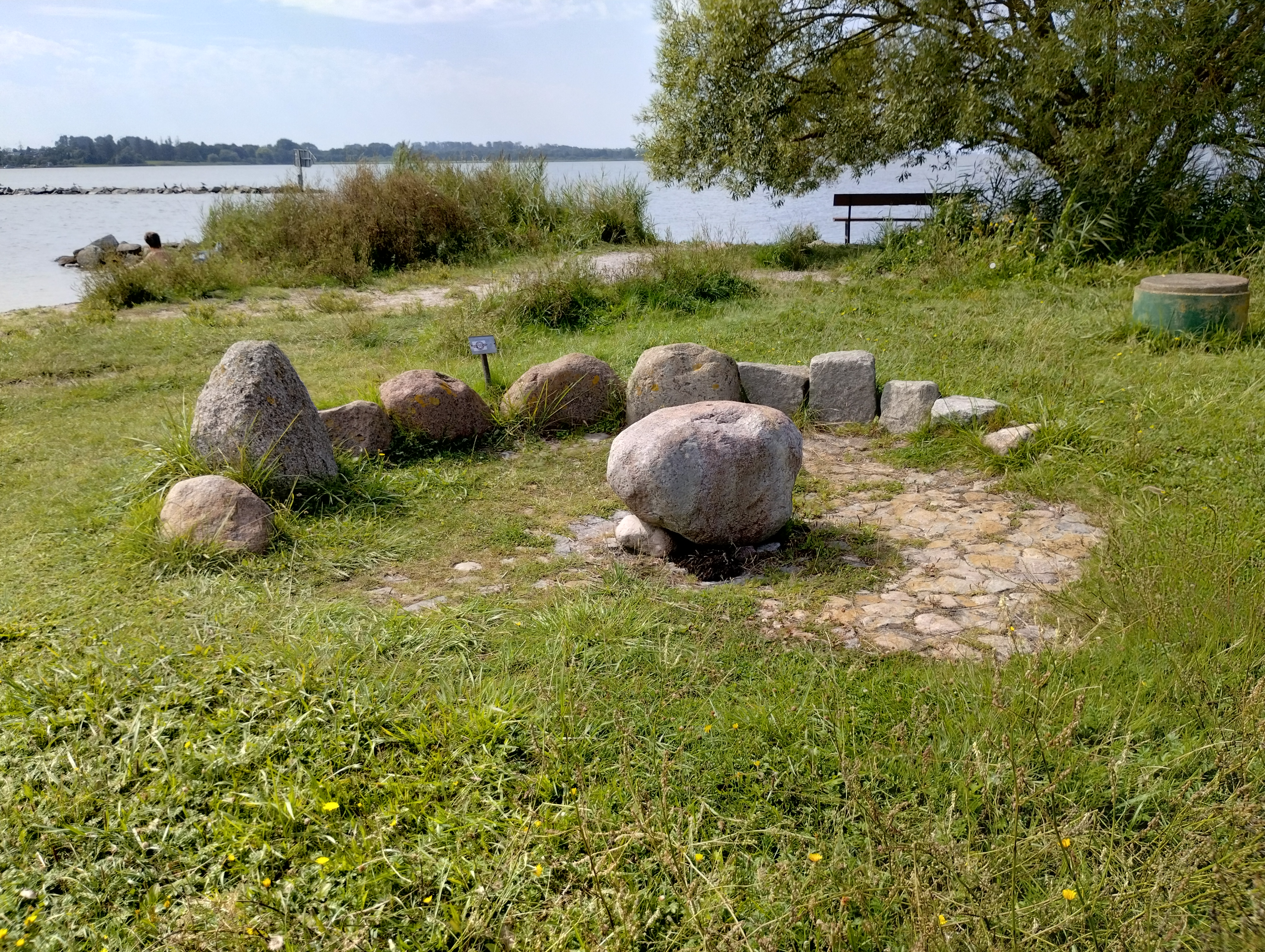
On the Schlei there is a spring (Offa-Quelle, Uffe-kilden), where, according to legend, Offa (Uffe) is said to have bathed before his fight on the Eider Island.

The family tree of legendary Kings of the Danes, according to the Gesta Danorum (Books I to VII)

Kings of the Danes are in bold and marked with a crown (♕). Kings of the Swedes are marked with a dagger (†). Superscript numbers before a name indicate in which books of Gesta Danorum the individual is mentioned.

^{(1)} Humble
KEY
^{(1)} Angul	^{(1)} **Dan** ♕	^{(1)} Grytha	Marriage or coupling
Parent and child
The Angles	^{(1)} **Humble** ♕	^{(1)} **Lother** ♕	^{(1)} King of the Saxons	Succession by other or unclear means
^{(1)} Roar
^{(1)} Sigtryg, King of the Swedes†	^{(1)} **Skiold** ♕	^{(1)} Alfhild
^{(1)} daughter of Roar	^{(1)} Bess
^{(1)} sister of Gram	^{(1)} Gróa	^{(1)} **Gram** ♕†	^{(1)} Sumble, King of the Finns
^{(1)} Wagnhofde
^{(1)} Signe	^{(1)} Henry, King of the Saxons	^{(1)} Hakon, King of the Nitherians
^{(1)} Hardgrep
^{(1)} **Swipdag** ♕†, King of Norway	^{(1)} sister of Guthorm	^{(1)} **Guthorm** ♕	^{(1,2,5)} **Hadding** ♕	^{(1)} Ragnhild
^{(1)} Asmund†	^{(1)} Gunnhild	^{(1)} Guthorm
^{(1,2)} Ulfhild	^{(2)} **Ubbe** ♕
^{(1)} Henry	^{(1)} Uffe†	^{(1,2)} Hunding†	^{(2)} Thorhild	^{(2)} Scot
^{(1)} daughter of Uffe	^{(2)} Ragnar†	^{(2)} Swanhwid	^{(2)} sisters of Swanhwid	^{(2)} Handwan
^{(2)} Thorwald
^{(2,5)} **Frode** ♕	^{(2)} daughter of Handwan
^{(2,3)} Hothbrodd†	^{(2)} **Halfdan** ♕	^{(2)} Ro	^{(2)} Skat
^{(2)} Thora
^{(2,3)} **Helge** ♕	^{(2)} **Ro** ♕
^{(2,3)} Athisl†	^{(2)} Urse
^{(2,3)} King Gewar	^{(2,3)} **Rolf** Krage ♕†	^{(2)} Rute	^{(2)} Bjarke	^{(2)} Skulde	^{(2,3)} **Hiartuar** †♕
^{(2,3)} **Hother** †♕	^{(3)} Nanna	^{(3)} Herlek	^{(3)} Gerit
^{(3)} former King of Britain	^{(3)} mother of the King of Britain	^{(3)} a slave	^{(3)} a bondmaid	^{(3)} **Rorik** Slyngebond ♕	^{(3)} Gerwendil
^{(3,4)} King of Britain	^{(3,4)} Queen of Britain	^{(3,4)} Gerutha	^{(3,4)} Horwendil	^{(3,4)} Feng
^{(3,4)} foster sister of Amleth	^{(3,4)} daughter of the King of Britain	^{(3,4)} Amleth	^{(4)} Hermutrude, Queen of Scotland	^{(4)} **Wiglek** ♕
^{(4)} son of Amleth	^{(4)} **Wermund** ♕	^{(4)} Frowin, governor of Sleswik
^{(4)} **Uffe** ♕, aka Olaf the Gentle	^{(4)} daughter of Frowin	^{(4)} Ket	^{(4)} Wig
^{(4)} **Dan** ♕
^{(4)} **Hugleik** ♕
^{(4)} **Frode** the Vigorous ♕
^{(4)} **Dan** ♕
^{(5)} Kraka	^{(5)} Ragnar	^{(5)} Brak	^{(4,5)} **Fridleif** the Swift ♕	^{(5)} Hun, King of the Huns	^{(5)} Hun
^{(5)} Gotar, King of Norway	^{(5)} Westmar	^{(5)} Koll	^{(5)} Gotwar
^{(5)} Roller	^{(5,6)} Erik† Shrewd-spoken	^{(5)} Gunwar the Fair	^{(5)} Alfhild	^{(5,6)} **Frode** ♕	^{(5)} Hanund	^{(5)} Grep (eldest of three)	^{(5)} 11 other sons (two named Grep)
^{(6)} Hythin, King of Tellemark	^{(5)} Alf	^{(5)} Eyfura	^{(5)} Arngrim	^{(6)} Grubb	^{(6)} **Hiarn** ♕	^{(6)} Amund, King of Norway
^{(6)} child of Hythin	^{(6)} Halfdan†	^{(5)} 12 sons, including Anganty	^{(6)} Ane	^{(6)} Juritha	^{(6)} **Fridleif** ♕	^{(6)} Frogertha
^{(6)} Hanef, King of Saxony	^{(6)} Swerting, King of Saxony	^{(6)} Olaf	^{(6)} **Frode** ♕
^{(6,7)} Siward†	^{(6)} sons of Swerting	^{(6)} sister of the sons of Swerting	^{(6,7)} **Ingild** ♕	^{(6)} Helga	^{(6)} Helge	^{(6)} Asa
^{(6,7)} Frode	^{(6,7)} Fridleif	^{(6,7)} Ingild	^{(6,7)} **Olaf** ♕	^{(7)} Karl, governor of Gothland
^{(7)} Ulfhild	^{(7)} **Frode** ♕	^{(7)} Hather, a chief	^{(7)} **Harald** ♕	^{(7)} Signe
^{(7)} Erik†	^{(7)} Thorhild	^{(7)} **Halfdan** Biargramm ♕†	^{(7)} Harald
^{(7)} Asmund
Kings of Norway

Name spellings are derived from Oliver Elton's 1905 translation, The First Nine Books of the Danish History of Saxo Grammaticus, via Wikisource.

== Literature ==
- See H. M. Chadwick, Origin of the English Nation (Cambridge, 1907), for references to the original authorities.
- Rickert, Edith. "The Old English Offa Saga." Modern Philology 2 (1904-5): 29-77 (part 1), 321-76 (part 2). PDF available from Internet Archive
- Shippey, Tom. "Wicked Queens and Cousin Strategies in Beowulf and Elsewhere." The Heroic Age 5 (2001).
- Shiels, Ian (2025). The matter of Englaland: the story of Offa of Angel, and the narrative world of Widsith (phd thesis). University of Leeds.
- Hunt, William (1895). "Offa (fl.709)" . In Lee, Sidney (ed.). Dictionary of National Biography. Vol. 42. London: Smith, Elder & Co.

Legendary titles
Preceded by Wermund	King of the Angles	Succeeded by Angeltheow
Preceded by Wermund	King of Denmark	Succeeded by Dan II
Preceded by Eadgils	King of the Myrgings	Abolished by Angeltheow
