= Icel of Mercia =

Icel

King of Mercia
- Reign: c. 515 – c. 535
- Successor: Cnebba
- Born: before 500; Denmark or Germany
- Died: c. 535; Mercia
- Issue: Cnebba
- House: Angles, Icelingas
- Father: Eomer

Icel (fl. early 500s, possibly c. 450–c. 525), also spelt Icil, is a possibly legendary king of Mercia. He was supposedly the son of Eomer, last King of the Angles in Angeln. Icel supposedly led his people across the North Sea to Britain around 515 during the Anglo-Saxon settlement of Britain. Icel was the eponymous ancestor of Mercia's first attested royal family, the Iclingas.

== History ==
Spread of Angles (red), which was Icel's tribe, and Saxons (blue) around 500 AD, which was well within Icel's lifetime

Icel was born before 500 and, if his genealogies can be trusted, became king of Anglia upon his father's death. He was the last king of Anglia, migrating to eastern England around 510. During the same year, he became king of Mercia.

By 527, Icel had worked his way through East Anglia and into Mercia, as it has been reported in the 13th century manuscript known as the Flores Historiarum: "Pagans came from Germany and occupied East Anglia, that is, the country of the East Angles; and some of them invaded Mercia, and waged war against the British." According to one source, his son Cnebba was born some time close to 526. By the end of his reign Icel reportedly held large portions of both East Anglia and Mercia, and therefore could be considered the first true king of Mercia. Icel was succeeded after his death, which may have been c. 535, by his son Cnebba.

Regnal titles
Preceded by Eomer	King of the Angles; 489-c. 515	Succeeded by none
Preceded by none	King of Mercia c. 515-c.535	Succeeded by Cnebba
