= Eadgils of the Myrgings =

Eadgils of the Myrgings is a king of the Myrgings a clan of Saxon origin who is mentioned on lines 93-96 in the Anglo-Saxon poem Widsith. He would have lived in the 5th century and is mentioned as the lord of the scop himself in the poem.

According to the Old English poem Widsith, before Eadgils became king, the Myrgings had been at war with a tribe called the Mofdings under the previous king Meaca who was probably killed in battle fighting against them resulting in their defeat and forcing the Myrgings to retreat back to the Eider where Eadgils probably became king, Following Meaca's death Eadgils became a powerful Myrging king by defeating the Mofdings and plundering the Angles and their lands as he was determined to rule over them, however the Angles forced the Myrgings to flight.

No other source remembers the Myrgings as they were probably assimilated to the surrounding Angles and only leaving the slightest of traces, This Eadgils has sometimes been confused with the Swedish king Eadgils who lived almost a century later.

Eadgils was at war with the Angles and plundered their lands, He slew Frowinus, the governor of Schleswig. Frowinus' sons Ket and Wig avenged their father's death by killing Eadgils, but did so by fighting two against one. Because of this Offa decided to fight two Myrging princes, probably the sons of Eadgils, and slew them. After this, the Myrgings were successfully conquered by Offa.

The slaying of Eadgils is also mentioned in Annales Ryenses and by the Danish historian Svend Aagesen. The latter says that the shameful act of letting two warriors fight at the same time against the Angle king Offa unable to speak when he was young.

Legendary titles
Preceded by Meaca	King of the Myrgings	Succeeded by Conquest by Offa of Angel
