= List of figures in Germanic heroic legend, T–Y =

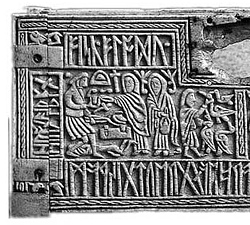
The smith Wayland from the front of the eighth-century Northumbrian Franks Casket.

== T ==
Figure	Names in medieval languages	Historical origin	Name meaning	Relationships	Early and English Attestations	Norse Attestations	German Attestations
Tanastus	Latin: Tanastus		The etymology is uncertain. The first element may be related to ON dana- ("Dane"), Low German dane ("swamp"), or it may be from PGmc danwō ("fir tree") or *dannio ("spruce tree"), a material from which weapons were made.	The eleventh warrior of Gunther killed by Walter of Aquitaine. He comes from Speyer.			Waltharius
Tarnung	Middle High German: Tarnunc		Based on MHG tarnen ("to conceal").	A dwarf king. His kingdom has been usurped by Bilbung, but Wolfdietrich restores it to his son.			Wolfdietrich
Tarias	Middle High German: Tarîâs, or Karinas		The name may be a corruption of Darius, used for heathen kings in Old French epic.	The heathen king and giant who threatens the monastery which Wolfdietrich has entered after abdicating his crown. He is killed and defeated by Wolfdietrich and his son Hugdietrich^{2}.			Wolfdietrich
Theodoric the Great				See Dietrich von Bern.			
Thether				See Diether.			
Thetleif				See Dietleib von Steier.			
Thetmar				See Dietmar.			
Theuderic I	Latin: Theudericus, Old English: Þeodric	Historical king of the Franks, who conquered the Thuringians in 531 and died c. 533. The figure Wolfdietrich has also been suggested to have his origins in this king.	See Dietrich von Bern.	In Widukind's Deeds of the Saxons, Theuderic is portrayed as the illegitimate son of King Huga. He becomes king after his father's death and attempts to befriend Hermanafrid, king of the Thuringians. However, Theuderic's sister Amalaberga, who is Hermanafrid's wife, convinces Hermanafrid to rebuff him. This leads Theuderic to bribe Hermanafrid's vassal Iring to kill Hermanafrid, which he does in Hermanafrid's presence. However, Iring then kills Theuderic to avenge his lord, placing Hermanfrid's corpse on top of Theuderic's.	Widsith (24, 115)	Rök runestone?	Deeds of the Saxons
Thidrek af Bern				See Dietrich von Bern.			
Thidrek Valdemarsson	Old Norse: Þiðrekr Valdemarsson	Theodoric Strabo has been suggested as the origin of this figure.	See Dietrich von Bern	Possibly the same figure as Dietrich von Griechen. He is a favorite and kinsman of Erka (Helche), the son of the Rus' king Valdemar, and a rival and opponent of Dietrich von Bern. He is captured and wounded by Dietrich; Helche heals him and he escapes, but Dietrich catches and beheads him.			Þiðreks saga
Thora	Old Norse: Þóra		Þóra is a hypocoristic form of female names beginning with Þór-, from the theonym Thor.	The daughter of King Hakon - Gudrun stays with her for three years after Sigurd's death.		Guðrúnarkviða I, Guðrúnarkvíða II, Völsunga saga	
Thora Borgarhjort	Old Norse: Þóra Borgarhjǫrtr		See Thora.	In Ad catalogum, she is the daughter of Gautrik, the baron of Gautland. After Ragnar Lodbrok had killed a very large snake, she was given to him as a reward, and before dying, she gave him the sons Eric^{3} and Agnar^{4}. In Bósa saga, she is instead the daughter of Herrauðr, by Gautrik's half-brother king Hring of Östergötland. Her father rescued her mother Hleiðr from the Bjarmians and brought back an egg from Bjarmaland, which hatched to become the snake that Ragnar killed. In Ragnars saga loðbrókar and Ragnarssona þáttr, her father Herruðr/Herrauðr has given her snake that grows to encircle her bower, until it is so large that he promises her to the man that can kill the serpent, which Ragnar does. She dies after having given Ragnar the sons Eric^{3} and Agnarr^{4}. In Gesta Danorum (IX), she is the daughter of the Swedish king Herroth who had given her some snakes that grew until they became so large that they terrorized the land. She was given as a reward to Ragnar after he had killed them. Ragnar divorces Lathgertha for her sake, and Thora gives him the sons Rathbarth and Dunwat, but she soon becomes ill and dies.		Bósa saga ok Herrauðs, Ragnars saga loðbrókar, Ragnarssona þáttr, Krákumál, Ad catalogum regum Sveciæ annotanda, Gesta Danorum (IX)	
Thorir Hound's Foot	Old Norse: Þórir hundsfótr		Þórir is from PN *Þunra-wīhaʀ and means "priest of Thor".	The son of Bjorn and Bera and brother of Bodvar Bjarki, he has dog's feet. He becomes king of the Geats.		Hrólfs saga kraka	
Thorir Iron-Shield	Old Norse: Þórir járnskjǫldr		See Thorir Hound's Foot	He is mentioned in the eddic poem Hyndluljóð together with his fellow housecarls Grim the Hardy, Gunnar Midwall, Ulf the Gaping, Brodd and Harvi. They are in the service of king Hrolf the Old. The legends of Thorir and Grim, the housecarls of Hrolf, are told in the saga Hrólfs saga Gautrekssonar. He is in the service of king Halfdan of Gardariki and in charge of his defensive force, and the foster-father of his daughter Alof. He advises his lord not to fight the Geatish king Hrolf, but to ally with him instead and give his daughter to Hrolf's brother Ketill. Unwisely, the king does not listen. After the battle, Thorir is seriously wounded and accepts to enter Hrolfs service on condition that his wound is taken care of. He becomes responsible for Hrolf's defenses. and when Hrolf goes to Ireland, he rules Sweden in his stead. When Hrolf is taken captive by the king of Ireland, he takes part in the rescue expedition, freeing him from the prison. In the end, he marries, settles down, becomes a prominent man in England and stays friends with his former liege.		Hyndluljóð, Hrólfs saga Gautrekssonar	
Thorkel the Stubborn/Gotlander	Old Norse: Þorkell þrái, Latin: Thorkill Guticus		The first element is Þór-, i.e. the god Thor, and the second element is ketill which means "helmet".	He appears at the massive Battle of Brávellir as one of the Swedish king Sigurd Ring's warriors in the battle against the Danish king Harald Wartooth. He is first mentioned as one of the archers sent from Telemark, and the Swedes expected little from these archers that they held to be slow speaking drawlers. He is later mentioned as one of the Swedish king's champions and he stops and kills the shield-maiden Vebjorg after a fierce fight with great deal of courage and many wounds. In Gesta Danorum, he is also mentioned among the Telemark archers who are described a brave but humble, but Thorkel is called "the Gotlander". When the shield-maiden Veborg threatens more Swedish warriors, she is stopped and killed by Thorkill. Saxo then praises the skills of the Gotlanders (Gut(t)ones) and their arrows that easily pierced both helmets and breastplates.		Sögubrot, Gesta Danorum (VIII)	
Thornbjorg	Old Norse: Þornbjǫrg		The basic meaning of þorn was "thorn", from PGmc *þurnjaz (m) or *þurnjōn (f), but it could also be used in compounds to mean "lady". The second element is PGmc *-berʒō or *-burʒō ("helper", "assistant").	She is a shield-maiden and a Swedish princess, the daughter of king Eric at Uppsala, but she has her residence at Ulleråker. She insists on deciding who she will marry and says it would be best for the kingdom. She is famed for her beauty, and has learnt not only all the female skills, but she has also mastered fighting with sword and shield. She has prevailed on her father to give her a third of Sweden, and rules it as king Thorberg. When the Geatish king Hrolf Gautreksson starts to woo her, she has already maimed or killed several previous suitors. He attacks her in her fortress, but only loses men, and he has to siege her for two weeks until he digs a tunnel under the walls and conquers her, after she has killed many men. When her husband Hrolf is on his last adventure in Ireland, he is taken captive and put in prison, and so she takes up arms again and arrives to save him and his men.		Hrólfs saga Gautrekssonar	
Thurisind	Latin: Thurisindus	Historical king of the Gepids (died c. 560)	The first element is probably PGmc *þursja ("giant"), the second element is probably PGmc *sinþa ("way, motion").	King of the Gepids, father of and Thurismod and Cunimund. Although Alboin has killed his son Thurismod, when Alboin comes to his court Thurisind spares Alboin's life because he is a guest.	Historia Langobardorum		
Thyle	Old English: Þyle		Interpreted as OE Þyle ("spokesman"), and it is attested as a personal name on a runestone in Sweden, the Runestone Sö 82, although the interpretation of the name is not secure.	Appears in Widsith, line 24 as the king of the Rondings, and he may have been the eponym of the people of Telemark.	Widsith		
Thyrso	German: Thyrso		PGmc *þursja ("giant").	A giant, he attacks the monastery of Wilten that had been founded by the hero Heime and is killed by him.			Early modern broadsheet (1601) from Wilten monastery near Innsbruck, Tyrol.
Trogus	Latin: Trogus		The name comes from PGmc *draug- (cf. Gothic driugan "to do war service").	The tenth warrior of Gunther killed by Walter of Aquitaine, he comes from Strasbourg.			Waltharius
Tryggvi	Old Norse: Tryggvi, Latin: Thrygir		The definite form of the ON adjective tryggr ("reliable").	He appears at the massive Battle of Brávellir as one of the Swedish king Sigurd Ring's warriors in the battle against the Danish king Harald Wartooth. In Sögubrot, he arrives with twelve warships together with Tvivifil. When the battle starts, he stands at the front of the wedge formation called svinfylking next to the greatest of them all, Rognvald the Tall or Radbard Fist, and Læsir. During the battle he engages Ubbi the Frisian but receives a mortal wound from him. In Gesta Danorum, he arrives with Tvi-Vifil with twelve ships but sailing separately. He is instructed to watch the right side of a crescent formation together with Ingo and his brothers, the sons of Alrik, while Lesi watched the left.		Sögubrot, Gesta Danorum (VIII)	
Tunni	Old Norse: Tunni	Probably based on a Swedish tradition about the Geatish warrior Eofor killing the Swedish king Ongentheow in battle.	ON Tunni is derived from PN *tunþā, which is from PN *tunþuʀ, cognate with Gothic tunþus ("tooth"), and it means the "one with big tooth". It probably refers to Ongentheow's Geatish slayer Eofor ("wild boar"). In the West Norse accounts Ongentheow/Egil^{2} is killed by the "horns of a bull", which in the East Norse dialect would have referred to the "tusk of a boar" (Eofor's sword).	The leader of a Swedish slave rebellion, according to Ynglinga saga and Historia Norwegiæ. He defeats the Swedish king Egil^{2}/Ongentheow in eight battles, but loses the ninth. Norwegians and Icelanders, appear to have misunderstood an original Swedish tradition preserved in the source Ynglingatal, which was based on Eofor ("wild boar") killing the Swedish king Ongentheow in battle.	Probably cognate with Eofor in Beowulf	Ynglingatal, Historia Norwegiæ, Ynglinga saga	
Turismod	Latin: Turismodus		The first element is probably PGmc *þursja ("giant"), the second element PGmc *mōda ("mind, spirit, courage").	Son of the Gepid king Thurisind. He is killed by the Lombard king Alboin.	Historia Langobardorum		

== U ==
Figure	Names in medieval languages	Historical origin	Name meaning	Relationships	Early and English Attestations	Norse Attestations	German Attestations
Ubbi of Friesland	Old Norse: Ubbi inn fríski, Latin: Ubbo Fresicus	A reflexion of a historical Ubba, called Ubba dux Fresciorum in the mid-9th c. Historia de sancto Cuthberto, who took part in the 9th c. Viking invasion of England.	Ubbi is a hypocoristic form of Úlfr ("wolf"), or possibly a form of úfr, earlier ūb- ("unpleasant").	He appears at the massive Battle of Brávellir as one of the Danish king Harald Wartooth's warriors in the battle against the Swedish king Sigurd Ring. When the battle began, Ubbi led the Danish army, first killing Rognvald (Radbard), Tryggvi, the sons of Alrek, and Yngvi^{2}, and causing such a massacre that the Swedish king sent in Starkad. The giant warrior gave Ubbi a serious wound while receiving six before they were separated by the throng of warriors. Ubbi was killed while walking towards the archers from Telemark who sent two dozen arrows into his chest, after he had wounded 11 champions and killed 16 Swedes and Geats. In Gesta Danorum, it is told that he had entered Danish service by being overwhelmed by Danes and given Harald's daughter in marriage. During the battle of Brávellir, Ubbi killed 25 champions and wounded 11 among the Swedes and the Geats, but the Telemark archers stopped the massacre by showering the warrior with arrows and he died having been riddled with 144 arrows, an event that turned the battle against the Danes.		Sögubrot, Gesta Danorum (VIII)	
Ubbi				For the son of Ragnar Lodbrok, see Husto			
Ulfrad				See Wolfhart			
Unferth	Old English: Unferð or Hunferð		The etymology is contested, but generally understood as OE un- (negative prefix "un-") and ferð ("peace"), thus "mar-peace". The second element could also be OE ferhð ("soul, spirit, mind, life"), giving a meaning "folly". un- might also mean "very." All manuscript attestations begin with an h-, which could indicate that the first element is OE hūn- ("Hun").	Unferth is the þyle ("orator") of king Hrothgar. He had his seat at the foot of his throne and both Hrothgar and Hrothulf (Hrólfr kraki) trust him in spite of the fact that he appears to have betrayed and killed his own brothers. When Beowulf arrives, he tries to sully his reputation by taunting him, but he later lends Beowulf the famous sword Hrunting, when the latter goes to kill Grendel and its mother. Olrik notes that his name appears to be symbolic in the story meaning "strife".	Beowulf		
Unwen	Old English: Unwēn, Latin: Hunuil		The name means "the unexpected one".	Appears in Widsith, line 114 as the son of Ostrogotha (Eastgota), i.e. the Hunuil of Jordanes.	Widsith, Getica		
Ute^{1}				See Grimhild/Ute^{1}			
Ute^{2}	Middle High German: Uote		Uote from a Low German *Ōda, from *ot- ("wealth"), thus "one with wealth"	The wife of Hildebrand^{1} and mother of Hadubrand/Alebrand. Hildebrand leaves her behind when he goes into exile with Dietrich von Bern. In the Jüngeres Hildebrandslied and Þiðreks saga, he returns to her after having defeated and reconciled with their son.			Hildebrandslied (unnamed), Þiðreks saga, Jüngeres Hildebrandslied, Dietrichs Flucht, Rosengarten zu Worms, Heldebuch-Prosa
Utstein				See Innstein and Utstein			

== V ==
Figure	Names in medieval languages	Historical origin	Name meaning	Relationships	Early and English Attestations	Norse Attestations	German Attestations
Valdar^{1}	Old Norse: Valdarr		The name is from PN *walda-harjaʀ, see Walter.	Valdar appears as at least two characters placed in different times. The Skjöldunga saga and Hversu Noregr byggdist tell of a Valdar who is the son of king Hrothgar in Beowulf, and the father of Harald the Old. The Hervarar saga tells of a Valdar who lived generations later.		Skjöldunga saga, Hversu Noregr byggdist	
Valdar^{2}	Old Norse: Valdarr		See Valdar^{1}	Valdar is a very obscure character that Hervarar saga places between Ivar Vidfamne and Harald Wartooth. It tells that Ivar made him king over the Danes and gave him his daughter Alfhild^{1}, with whom Valdar had the sons Harald Wartooth and Randvér. Valdar died in Denmark and Randvér succeeded him as king of the Danes, but later died in England. Valdar was succeeded by Harald as the king of Götaland (the land of the Geats in Beowulf), who later took over the entire realm of Harald Wartooth.		Hervarar saga	
Valdar^{3}/Valdemar	Old Norse: Valdarr or Valldemarr		See Valdar^{1} above, and Valdemar below.	In Guðrúnarkviða II, Valdar of the Danes appears as one of Gudrun's suitors. Hollander considers the mention out of place and moves it to the notes, while Finch considers it meaningless. In Völsunga saga, the name has been changed to Valdemar which was the name of several Danish kings.		Guðrúnarkviða II, Völsunga saga	
Valdemar	Old Norse: Valldemarr, Old Swedish Waldemar	The figure appears to be based on Vladimir the Great (died 1015).	The name is a borrowing from Slavic, but in Old Norse it has gone through a reinterpretation, where the first element has been connected to våld ("violence") and vålla ("to inflict"), cf. vald- which means "ruler". The second element has been connected to the element mar in Ingmar, i.e. marr which means "excellent, praiseworthy".	The king of the Russians, brother of Oserich (Osantrix), king of the Wilzen (Veleti), uncle of Hertnið, and father of the figure known in German as Dietrich von Kriechen. Dietrich von Bern fights against him on behalf of Attila, killing him in battle.			Þiðreks saga
Valsleyt	Old Norse: Valsleitr		The second element -leitr was used in compounds and means "looking so and so", while the first element is genitive singular of valr which meant "slain" or "carrion-hawk".	When his father king Hring had died Bödvar Bjarki married his mother Bera/Hildr off to a jarl named Valsleyt, and renounced the kingship.		Hrólfs saga kraka, Bjarkarímur	
Valtari				See Walter of Aquitaine			
Vanlandi	Old Norse: Vanlandi, Latin: Wanlanda		The name means "man from the land of the Vanir" (a clan of Norse gods), but it can also be read as "landless".	Vanlandi was an early king of Sweden who succeeded his father Sveigðir. His mother was Vana from Vanaheimr. He was warlike and travelled far. One winter he stayed for the winter with Snær ("snow") in Lappland and married his daughter Drífa^{1} ("snowdrift"), but he left her there when spring arrived. He had promised to return for her after three years, but ten years passed without him keeping his promise. Humiliated Drífa^{1} sent their son Vísburr to Uppsala (where the Swedish king resided) accompanied by a witch named Hulð, whom she had paid to transport Vanlandi to Lappland with magic, or kill him. The magic caused Vanlandi to want to go Lappland, but his advisors made him stay. Instead Hulð had him hag ridden to death. He was buried at Skutá, which is generally considered to be a small stream north of Uppsala.		Ynglingatal (III), Historia Norwegiæ, Íslendingabók, Ynglinga saga (13)	
Var	Old Norse: Varr		The name means "aware".	King Fróði had two smiths named Var, Var the wary and Var the careful. Their names are used with their meaning "aware" to communicate the plan of killing of the king without his realizing what is happening		Hrólfs saga kraka	
Veborg	Old Norse: Vébjǫrg, Latin: Webiorg		The first element vé- or ví- is probably from PGmc *wīha, from an adjective meaning "holy" (cf. Gothic weihs, "holy"), but it can also be derived from við- ("wood") and víg- ("battle") and loss of final consonant. The second element is PGmc *-berʒō or *-burʒō ("helper", "assistant"). Heiðr, the name of her sister-in-arms, can be connected to the then Danish town Hedeby, and Vebjorg's name can connected to the Danish town Viborg.	She is a shield-maiden who appears together with the other shield-maidens Visma (or Visna) and Heiðr on the Danish king Harald Wartooth's side at the massive Battle of Brávellir against the Swedish king Sigurd Ring. In Sögubrot, she arrives from the Gotland with many champions and other warriors, including Ubbi the Frisian, but it was probably Jutland that was originally referred to. When she saw Ubbi the Frisian riddled with arrows and killed, she assaulted the Swedes and the Geats. She attacked Attack-Soti and chopped off his jawbone so he had to bite his beard to keep it place, before he was slain. She was eventually killed by the champion Thorkel the Stubborn. In Gesta Danorum, she arrives from Schleswig with Visna, and brings many champions such as Ubbi the Frisian. She later killed the champion Soti, but was herself killed with an arrow by Thorkil from Telemark who was one of the master archers from Gotland.		Sögubrot, Gesta Danorum (VIII)	
Velle	Middle High German: Velle or Middle High German: Helle		The name may be from MHG velle ("fall, crash") or vel ("skin, hide" with a further sense of "person").	A giant, he brings the dragon eggs into Ortnit's kingdom on behalf of Machorel. He is married to the giantess Runze. In Wolfdietrich d, Wolfdietrich kills them.			Ornit, Wolfdietrich, Heldenbuch-Prosa
Vésete	Old Norse: Véseti, Old Norse: Viðseti	Fictive.	The name means someone who resides at, or takes care of, a sanctuary.	One of Hrólfr kraki's champions.		Prose Edda (Skáldskaparmál)	
Vifil	Old Norse: Vífill		The name has two derivations. One is from *wīgwilaz which means "pagan priest", and the other one is from *webilaz, i.e. "weevil", a bug.	An old man who lived on a wooded island, and who was a skilled wizard. When their father Halfdan (Healfdene) was murdered by their uncle, he hid the boys Hroar (Hrothgar) and Helgi (Halga) on his island, until their uncle came looking for them. Then he sent them away to their brother-in-law jarl Sævil, as they were no longer safe with him.		Hrólfs saga kraka, Bjarkarímur	
Vikar	Old Norse: Víkarr, Latin: Wicarus		Simek refers to Höfler's etymology, where the first element is ví ("holy") and the second element is kárr ("long hair") indicating the meaning of "long hair" in dedications to Odin. Peterson derives the first element from vík ("bay"), and the second element from *-gaizaz ("spear"), *-warjaz ("protector") or -harjaz ("war chief, warrior").	In Gautrek's saga, the Hordaland king Vikarr is becalmed at sea with his foster-brother Starkad and after drawing lots he is to be mock-sacrificed to Odin. However, the weak twig he was to be hanged from turned into a thick branch and the reed Starkad was to strike him with turned into a spear, and so he was stabbed and hanged as a sacrifice to Odin. In Gesta Danorum, the hanging results from a too tight knot and Starkad pierces him with a sword. Vikar had already been promised to Odin in a prophecy, and in Gautrek's saga, Starkad exclaims that he gives him to Odin. The sacrifice resembles Odin's self-sacrifice.		Gautreks saga, Gesta Danorum (VI), Hálfs saga ok Hálfsrekka, Ættartolur	
Vilkinus	Old Norse: Vilkinus, Old Swedish Wilkinus possibly Latin: Wasce		The name is a quasi-Latinate version of the German ethnic name Wilze (the Veleti).	The king of the Veleti in Þiðreks saga, against whom Dietrich von Bern fights on behalf of Attila. A story in Gesta Danorum about Starkad defeating a king "Wasce" in Poland may reflect the same legend. In the Þiðreks saga, he is the father of Vaði (see Wade) via a mermaid (see Wachilt), and thus the grandfather of Wayland and great grandfather of Witege.		Possibly Gesta Danorum.	Þiðreks saga
Vildifer, Vildever	Old Norse: Vildiver, Old Swedish Wildefer	Possibly derived from a common folktale of a helpful bear driving out an evil spirit.	The saga author has interpreted the name as meaning "wild boar" (Low German wildeƀur, with ƀ pronounced v), however a Low German Epic Van bere Wisselaue indicates that the primary meaning was wildi bero ("wild bear"). Another interpretation of the Norse name would be víldivèr ("wild man"). His name in disguise Vizleo, which the saga author says means "white lion", is a folk etymology for what appears in Low German as Wisselau, likely from the Czech name Vaclov, a typical name for a Bohemian dancing bear.	A warrior who joins Dietrich's court, becoming friends with Widige (Vithga); he is one of Dietrich's champions against King Isung^{1}. When Widige is imprisoned by King Oserich/Osantrix, Vildifer dresses in a bear's hide and pretends to be a dancing bear accompanying a minstrel named Isung. Osantrix is impressed, but sets his dogs on the bear, so that Vildifer becomes enraged and kills Osantrix and two giants (Ebenrot/Abentrod and Widolf), freeing Widige. He dies in the battle at Gronsport.			Þiðreks saga
Vilmund	Old Norse: Vilmundr	Appears to be an invention of the poet.	The first element is vili ("desire", "wish"), and the second element from ON mundr ("protector").	In the eddic poem Oddrúnargrátr, one of Atilla's warriors, and who is revealed to be the one who killed Högni (by cutting out his heart). He is the father of Borgny's children.		Oddrúnargrátr	
Vingi				See Knéfröðr.			
Virginal	Middle High German: Virginâl		Uncertain origin. Possibly related to Gothic fairguni ("mountain"), OE firgen ("mountain forest")and Old Norse Fjörgyn, but with an obvious similarity to Latin virgo ("virgin").	A dwarf queen, threatened by the heathen Orkise and liberated by Dietrich von Bern.			Virginal
Visbur	Old Norse: Vísburr, Latin: Wisbur		The first element is víss which means "wise" or "certain", from PGmc *wīsaz, and the second element is burr which means "son" from PGmc *buriz. However, the second element has also been interpreted as one of Odin's names, and it could also mean "strong young man" among Continental Germanic tribes.	Snorri tells in Ynglinga saga that one winter Vanlandi, the king of Sweden, stayed with Snær ("snow") in Lappland and his daughter Drífa. He married her promising to return for her after three years. However, after ten years he had still not returned. Humiliated Drífa^{1} sent their son Vísburr to Uppsala (where the Swedish king resided) accompanied by a witch named Huld, whom she had paid to transport Vanlandi to Lappland with magic, or kill him. The magic caused Vanlandi to want to go Lappland, but his advisors made him stay. Instead Huld had him hag ridden to death. When Vísburr was king, he married the daughter of Auði inn auðgi, but later rejected her and she went to her father with their sons Gísl and Ǫndurr. He married another woman and had the son Dómaldi with her. When his rejected sons were 12 and 13, they came to him to claim their mother's gold necklace, but he refused. Gísl and Ǫndurr contacted Huld who promised to help them kill their father by casting a curse on him, but warned that doing so she would curse the Yngling dynasty with kinslaying. The two boys did not heed the warning but set their father's hall on fire one night and burnt him to death with his retinue.		Ynglinga saga (13 and 14), Íslendingabók, Ynglingatal (IV), Historia Norwegiæ	
Visna	Old Norse: Visma or Visina, Latin: Wisna		Visna's name may be derived from the river Visla, like Heiðr, the name of her sister-in-arms, can be connected to the then Danish town Hedeby, and Vebjorg's to the Danish town Viborg.	She is a shield-maiden who appears together with the other shield-maidens Vebjorg and Heiðr on the Danish king Harald Wartooth's side at the massive Battle of Brávellir against the Swedish king Sigurd Ring. In Sögubrot, she is Harald Wartooth's standard bearer and arrives with the champions Kari and Milva, and she also brought a great many Slavic warriors. During the battle she meets the giant warrior Starkad and tells him that he is going to Hel and calls him þurs ("ogre") which was both a correct statement and an insult, before he cuts off her hand that holds the Danish banner. Brái tries to avenge her only to be added to the piles of corpses. In Gesta Danorum, she arrives from Schleswig with Vebjorg leading Haki scarface and Tummi the voyager, but she leads mainly Slavic warriors. Although a woman she is thoroughly hard and an expert warrior. During the battle she is in the central position as Harald's standard bearer, until Starkad cuts off her hand.		Sögubrot, Gesta Danorum (VIII)	
Vithga				See Widige			
Vöggr^{1}	Old Norse: Vǫggr, Latin: Viggr		The name Vöggr means "child in cradle" from vagga ("cradle"). Viggr means "horse", but it may mean the "iron fitting part of an axe blade", cf. the meaning of Hjalti, Wiglaf's other counterpart in Scandinavian sources.	A Swede: he gives Hrólfr Kraki his nickname kraki ("bar"), warns him about Eadgils treachery, and vows to avenge Hrólfr's death, which he does after the later is killed by Heoroweard and Skuld.		Chronicon Lethrense, Gesta Danorum, Skáldskaparmál, Hrólfs saga kraka	
Vöggr^{2}	Old Norse: Vǫggr		See Vöggr^{1}.	He is a messenger who brings messages between the Saxons and the Huns. He remarks to Ásmund that he has never seen another man who could be compared to Hildibrand^{2} (Ásmund's half-brother, although he does not know it), and he also compares their swords. They were made by the same dwarves, Alíus and Olíus, but one was cursed and sunk into lake Mälaren only to be retrieved by Ásmund later, while the other one was passed on to Hildibrand^{2}.		Åsmunds saga kappabana	
Vǫlundr				See Wayland the Smith.			
Volker von Alzey	Middle High German: Volkêr, Old Norse: Folker	Possibly based on a historical minstrel who acquired a piece of land in Flanders in 1130/31.	Compound of MHG volk ("people, army") and her(e) ("army").	Minstrel of Gunther. He is killed by Hildebrand^{1} during the fighting at Attila's hall in the Nibelungenlied. In Walther und Hildegund, he escorts Walter of Aquitaine and Hildegund through the Vosges. He appears in small roles elsewhere. In the Þiðreks saga, he is killed by Dietrich von Bern.			Nibelungenlied, Þiðreks saga, Walther und Hildegund, Rosengarten zu Worms, Dietrichs Flucht, Rabenschlacht, Heldenbuch-Prosa.
Völsung	Old English: Wæls, Old Norse: Völsungr. Middle High German: Welsunc is attested as the name of a sword.	The figure is probably derived from a Frankish legend originally.	George Gillespie states that the name is probably based on PGmc *wala- ("selected, beloved"), comparing Gothic walisa ("beloved"). It could also derive from the equivalent of ON völsi ("phallus"), possibly as a name for Odin.	When the Hunnish king Rerir and his queen were unable to conceive, Odin and Frigg heard their prayer and sent an apple with the Valkyrie Hljod (daughter of the gian Hrímnir) in the shape of a crow to Rerir. The queen became pregnant with Völsung, but he stayed in her womb for six years until his mother asked to have him cut out of her. Völsung grew to be big and strong and when he was a grown man Hrímnir sent his daughter Hljod to him to be his wife. They had 10 children and among them the twins Sigmund and Signy. When Signy was betrothed to king Siggeir, the king of the Geats, the latter was offended when Odin brought Völsung a sword and not him. Völsung's son Sigmund was the only one who could pull out the sword from the tree Barnstokkr where Odin had inserted it. Siggeir treacherously invited Völsung and his sons to visit him, then had Völsung killed.	Beowulf	Völsunga saga, Norna-Gests þáttr, mentioned in Eddic poems.	
Vǫttr	Old Norse: Vǫttr		Vǫttr means "glove", from PGmc *wantuz. He is called Óttar, like the Swedish king he kills in Historia Norwegiæ which is probably a misreading. Wessén derives the names of Vǫttr and his brother/co-jarl Fasti from old Scandinavian legal language, where vǫttr means "juror" and fasti means "witness in real estate transactions".	See entry Fasti for a fuller description of Vǫtt's role in Ynglingatal, Historia Norwegiæ and Ynglinga saga. In Historia Norwegiæ and in Beowulf, Vǫttr and Fasti are brothers, but this is not mentioned in Ynglingatal and Ynglinga saga. Vǫttr is also mentioned in Skáldskaparmál and in Hrólf Kraki's saga as one of Hrólfr Kraki's champions.	Cognate with Wulf^{1} of Beowulf	Ynglingatal, Historia Norwegiæ, Ynglinga saga 27, Skáldskaparmál, Hrólf Kraki's saga	

== W ==
Figure	Names in medieval languages	Historical origin	Name meaning	Relationships	Early and English Attestations	Norse Attestations	German Attestations
Wachilt	Middle High German: Wâchilt		First element probably MHG wâc ("wave"). Second element PGmc *hildjō- ("strife, conflict")	A mermaid. Mother of Wade, great-grandmother of Witige. In the Þiðreks saga, she is an unnamed mermaid and the father of Wade is King Vilkinus. In the Rabenschlacht, Wachilt rescues Witige from the enraged Dietrich von Bern after Witige has killed the sons of Attila with Helche and Diether; the same is reported in the Swedish Didrik Krönike, where she is also unnamed.			Rabenschlacht. In the Þiðreks saga, unnamed.
Wade	Old English: Wada, Middle High German: Wate, Old Norse: Vaði, Old Swedish Wade	Probably originally a water spirit.	Probably from PGmc *wað- ("to stride, to wade").	In Kudrun, Dukus Horant, and Widsith, one of Heoden's warriors. He commands the final assault against the Normans and beheads the wicked queen Gerlind. In the Þiðreks saga and Dukus Horant, he is a giant. In Þiðreks saga, he is also the father of Wayland.	Widsith, Tale of Wade		Kudrun, Dokus Horant, Þiðreks saga
Walberan	Middle High German: Walberân		The name may be a corruption of Old French Auberon.	King of all the dwarfs and Laurin's protector. In one version of Laurin, he fights with Dietrich after Laurin's defeat and conversion to Christianity. Laurin mediates between the sides.			Laurin
Wald	Old English: Wald		The name means "ruler", from PGmc *walđōn.	Appears in Widsith, line 30 as the king of the Woings, but he is unknown from other sources.	Widsith		
Walgund	Middle High German: Walgunt		The first element could be PGmc *walah- ("foreign"), PGmc *wala- ("dead, slain"), or related to Gothic *walis(a) ("beloved, chosen"), and waljan ("to choose"). The second element must be from PGmc *gunþaz, a masculine counterpart to gunþi ("battle"), which is a very common final element in female names.	The father of Hildeburg^{3}, whom he keeps secluded in a tower. Hugdietrich seduces her while disguised as a woman and becomes pregnant, giving birth to Wolfdietrich. Walgunt is persuaded to forgive her.			Ortnit, Heldenbuch-Prosa
Walter of Aquitaine	Old English: Waldere, Middle High German: Walther, Old Norse: Valtari	No clear historical origin, name possibly connected to the Visigothic king Wallia.	"Rule-army", based on the equivalents of OHG waltan ("to rule") and hari ("people, army").	Lover of Hildegund. In Waltharius, his father sends him as a hostage to Attila's court where he is a fine warrior. He falls in love with Hildegund and escapes with her. Passing through the territory of Gunther, he is forced to fight Gunther and Hagen/Högni^{1}. Similar events are alluded to in the Nibelungenlied and contained in the fragmentary epics Walther und Hildegund and Waldere. In Biterolf und Dietleib, he fights his uncle Biterolf until they recognize each other. He plays a small role in some other epics. In the Þiðreks saga, he is Ermanaric's nephew.	Waldere		Waltharius, Walther und Hildegund, Nibelungenlied, Þiðreks saga, Biterolf und Dietleib, Rosengarten zu Worms, Dietrichs Flucht, Rabenschlacht, Alpharts Tod.
Wärbel	Wärbel(în)		The name "Wärbel" is probably derived from MHG werben ("to strive, to beg").	In the Nibelungenlied, Wärbel is Etzel (Attila)'s minstrel, together with Swämmel. The two are sent as messengers to invite the Burgundians to Etzel's hall. Hagen cuts off Wärbel's hand during the fighting at Etzelburg in revenge for the invitation.			Nibelungenlied, Nibelungenklage
Wayland the Smith	Old Norse: Völundr or Old Norse: Velant, Old Swedish Weland, Middle High German: Wielant, Old English: Wēland	Not historical.	PGmc *Wēland-, a participle meaning "cunning [craftsman]" from a root related to ON vél ("cunning, deceit") and véla ("to create, construct with art"). Norse form Völundr instead from PN *Walund-, probably same root.	A great smith. According to Völundarkviða, he has two brothers, Egill^{1} and Slagfiðr, and a valkyrie wife. He is captured by king Niðuðr (Nithhad) and hamstrung. As revenge he kills Nithhad's sons and makes jeweled cups out of their skulls and rapes Nithhad's daughter Böðvildr (Beodhild). After obtaining oaths from the king that his unborn child and its mother are safe, he informs Nithhad of his actions and departs by flying on wings he has made. A similar story is told in the Þiðreks saga, where it is revealed that he fathered Widege (Vithga) with Böðvildr. He reconciles with Nithhad's son.	Deor, Waldere, Beowulf	Völundarkviða	Þiðreks saga, Heldenbuch-Prosa, otherwise, frequently mentioned as the father of Witige and as the maker of weapons.
Wealhtheow	Old English: Wealhþēow		Generally translated as "foreign slave", from OE wealh ("foreign") and þēow ("slave."). E.V. Gordon proposed that the first element was instead PGmc *wala- ("beloved, chosen").	Wife of Hrothgar. It is implied in Widsith that Helming, the name of her clan, was a synonym for Wulfing. Newton connects the Helmings to two locations named Helmingham in East Anglia where he considers Scandinavian Wulfings to have settled, and the 12th Skjöldunga saga asserts that Hrothgar's queen was English, while the probably 14th c. Hrólfs saga kraka says that she was the daughter of king Norðri of Northumberland, a name which Newton considers to be misunderstanding of Norðfolc (Norfolk in East Anglia). Hrólfs saga kraka calls her Ögn, which Malone considers to be a back-formation of Agnar^{3}, the name of her son. She trusts that Roðulf (Hrólfr kraki) will be a good guardian for her sons if Hrothgar dies, and she gives Hrothgar the advice not to adopt Beowulf so that their sons may inherit the throne. She follows the expected role of the hostess and raises a cup to the warriors after Beowulf's rebuke of Unferth. She bestows on Beowulf a valuable necklace that he later gives to the Geatish queen Hygd, and it is the same ornament that the Franks later take as spoil of war from Hygd's husband king Hygelac.	Beowulf	Hrólfs saga kraka and Skjöldunga saga mention a wife of Hrothgar who was an Anglo-Saxon princess.	
Weohstan	Old English: Wēohstān or Wīhstān, Old Norse: Vésteinn		PN Wīhastainaz from *wīha- meaning "sacred" (cf. Gothic weihs, "sacred") and *stainaz ("stone").	The father of Wiglaf. According to Belden, Stjerna and Klaeber, Weohstan and other Wægmundings may have belonged to the Wendlas, an aristocratic Swedish clan which would have resided at Vendel in Sweden. During the Swedish civil war that ended in the Battle on the Ice of Lake Vänern, they sided with Onela, against Eadgils and Eanmund, and after Eadgils' victory they had to go into exile. Weohstan who had slain Eanmund ended up with the Geats while Wulgar sought refuge among the Danes.	Beowulf	Kálfsvísa in Skáldskaparmál	
Werinhardus	Latin: Werinhardus		The first element is from the ethnonym Varini, and the second element is hardu ("hard"), from PGmc *χarđuz.	The third warrior of Gunther killed by Waltharius, he is a descendant of Pandarus, a famous Trojan archer.			Waltharius
Wermund	Old English: Gārmund, Latin: Warmundus, Latin: Wermundus	Probably based on a historic king of the Angels, in the second half of the 4th c.	Wer-, the first element of Wermund is either verr ("man") or verja ("protect"), from PGmc *wiraz and *warjanan respectively. Gār- the first element in Gārmund is from *ʒaizaz ("spear"). The second element is PGmc *munda ("protection).	The Garmund and Offa of Beowulf (lines 1948–62) are the same as the Wermund and Uffi of Danish tradition. The legend of king Wermund and his son Offa, who were probably Angles, has survived in two distinct versions, one Anglo-Saxon, where they are Anglo-Saxon, and one Danish where they are Danish. In the English tradition, his father is named Wihtlæg and in the Danish Vigletus. In both versions, Wermund is an old man who has an unpromising son Offa/Uffi who later wins fame as a great warrior.	Beowulf (lines 1948–62), Vitae duorum Offarum (or Legend of St Albans), Mercian Genealogy in A. S. Chron. (year 755), and other Chronicles.	Gesta Danorum, Brevis historia regum Dacie	
Wernher von Wernhers Mark	Middle High German: Wernhêr von Wernhêres Marke	A man named Wernher is attested the March of Ancona in 1094, and many of his descendants had the same name afterwards, so that the march was sometimes called marcia Guarnerii ("Wernher's March").	The first element, wern- is from the ethnonym Varini, and the second element is harja ("host"), from PGmc *χariz or *χarjaz.	In Wolfdietrich D, both a wealthy burgher of Tervis (Treviso) and ruler of Wernhers Mark, he is the father of Amie. In Rabenschlacht, he dies at the battle before Raben (Ravenna).			Wolfdietrich, Dietrichs Flucht, Rabenschlacht, Heldenbuch-Prosa
Wethergeld	Old English: Wiðergyld		The name means "avenger" or "requital", but is not otherwise attested as a noun.	A Heaðo-Beard warrior mentioned in Beowulf, line 2051. As a leader among the Heaðo-Beards, the battle probably turned against them when he was slain. He may have been the father of the young warrior mentioned on line 2044. The name also appears in Widsith (line 124), but there it does not seem to refer to a Heaðo-Beard.	Beowulf, Widsith?		
Wichart (Witschach)	Middle High German: Wîchart or Middle High German: Witschach		The alternation between ch (/x/) and tsch (/tʃ/) is also seen for the figure Richart (Ritschart), who is usually mentioned with Wichart. Wilhelm Grimm suggested that the form Witschach was a Slavic name.	One of Dietrich von Bern's men, in the Nibelungenlied he is killed by the Burgundians. He is said to be the brother of Gerbart in Biterolf und Dietleib.			Nibelungenlied, Nibelungenklage, Alpharts Tod, Biterolf und Dietleib
Widolf, Widolt	Middle High German: Widolf/Witolt, Widolt mit der stange, Old Norse: Vidolfr mittumstangi, Old Swedish Vidulf	An identical giant appears in the minstrel epic König Rother.	The form ending in -olf from OHG wolf ("wolf"), the form ending in olt from OHG waltan ("to rule"). His Norse epithet mittumstangi is from MHG mit der stange ("with the staff").	A giant. In Þiðreks saga, one of the four giant sons of King Nordian, who fights with a long iron staff. His brother Aspilian orders him to be kept in chains and only released when he is to fight. He is ultimately killed by Dietrich's man Wildifer. In Dukus Horant, he is one of the members of Horant (Heorrenda's) embassy to King Hagen/Högni^{2} to acquire Hilde/Hildr^{1} from Etene (Heoden).			Þiðreks saga, Dukus Horant
Widsith	Old English: Wīdsīð	Fictitious.	The name means "far journey",	The fictitious scop who tells the poem named after him.	Widsith		
Wig	Latin: Wigo, Old English: Wig	The legend about Offa is probably based on historical inter-tribal rivalries before the Anglo-Saxon settlement of England.	Wig is from PGmc *wīʒan ("fight") or *wīʒaz ("fighter").	In the Danish accounts, Ket and Wig are the sons of Frowinus, the governor of the region of Schleswig. During a Swedish invasion, their father is killed by the Swedish king Athislus in single combat, after which king Wermund appoints Ket and Wig as successors. To avenge their father they go to Sweden, where they ambush king Athislus and kill him, causing disgrace to their tribe. Their brother-in-law Offa will redeem them by defeating two men in single combat. Wig is mentioned in the Anglo-Saxon chronicle as a descendant of Odin (Wodan) and the son of Freawine (Frowinus).	The Anglo-Saxon chronicle	Gesta Danorum (IV), Brevis historia regum Dacie	
Wiglaf	Old English: Wīglāf	Beowulf is generally considered to be based on historic people and events.	PN: *Wīgalaibaz meaning "battle survivor".	A Swedish warrior and a relative of Beowulf, both being of the Waegmunding clan, apparently related to the Swedish royal dynasty. He is the only one who dared follow Beowulf to slay the dragon, and only one to survive. He has two cognates in Scandinavian sources, Hjalti, and the Swedish hero Vǫgg^{1}.	Beowulf		
Wikram	Middle High German: Wîcram		The name means "battle raven".	The leader of twelve giants under the control of Duke Nitger at Muter. He imprisons Dietrich on the basis that Dietrich and his men had killed hundreds of giants in "Britanje" (Brittany or Britain). He is killed by Dietrich during the combats affecting his release.			Virginal
Witege	Old English: Wuðga or Widia, Old Norse: Viðga, Old Swedish Witeke Middle High German: Witige or Witege, later also Wittich	Probably a merger of Vidigoia, a Gothic warrior, and the Ostrogothic usurper Vitiges (died 542).	Based on PGmc *wiðu- ("forest").	Son of Wayland, companion of Heime^{1}. In Widsith, he is listed with Hama as an exiled warrior at Ermanaric's court, while Waldere relates that Dietrich von Bern once gave him a sword for rescuing him from giants. In several epics, he is one of Dietrich von Bern's men, but in the historical Dietrich epics, he fights for Ermanaric. In Rabenschlacht, he kills Dietrich's brother Diether and the sons of Attila, causing the enraged Dietrich to pursue him into the sea belching fire - he is rescued by Wachilt, a mermaid. According to the Þiðreks saga, he is the son of Wayland and Beodohild. He becomes one of Dietrich's men but later joins Ermanaric. In the Swedish version, Dietrich eventually finds and kills him.	Getica, Widsith, Waldere		Þiðreks saga, Dietrichs Flucht, Rabenschlacht, Alpharts Tod, Rosengarten zu Worms, Laurin, Virginal, Biterolf und Dietleib
Witta	Old English: Witta		Perhaps from a word for "wood" or "wide".	Appears in Widsith, line 22 as the king of the Suebes. According to Bede, he was the grandfather of Hengest and so the Suebes can be assumed to have taken part in the migration to Britain.	Widsith, Historia ecclesiastica gentis Anglorum		
Wod	Old English: Wōd		The name means "furious, mad with rage", and cognate with Óðr from Norse mythology, from PGmc *wōđaz.	Appears in Widsith, line 30 as the king of the Thuringians, but he appears nowhere else.	Widsith		
Wolfbrand	Middle High German: Wolfbrant		Wolf means "wolf", and the second element brant means "sword".	A vassal of Dietrich von Bern; in the Nibelungenlied he dies fighting the Burgundians. In Biterolf und Dietleib, he is the brother of Richart and Wolfwin. He fights Gelpfrat in the combats at Worms.			Nibelungenlied, Nibelungenklage, Biterolf und Dietleib, Virginal
Wolfdietrich	Middle High German: Wolfdietrîch	Disputed, potentially a Merovingian ruler such as Theuderic I.	The Wolf- element may mean "outlaw". For -dietrich, see Dietrich von Bern.	Son of Hugdietrich. Accounts of his youth vary by version, but he is brought up by Berchtung. After Hugdietrich's death, his brothers try to exclude him from the inheritance. He escapes and goes to Lombardy, where he kills the dragon that killed king Ortnit, marries his widow, and becomes the new king. He then reconquers Hugdietrich's kingdom.	Widsith, if the identification of Wolfdietrich with Theuderic I is correct.		Wolfdietrich, Dietrichs Flucht, Eckenlied, Heldenbuch-Prosa. In Þiðreks saga, Wolfdietrich is identified with Dietrich von Bern.
Wolfhart	Middle High German: Wolfhart, Old Norse: Ulfrað		First element PGmc *wulfa- ("wolf"), second element PGmc *hardu- ("hard").	Vassal of Dietrich von Bern, nephew of Hildebrand^{1}, brother of Alphart. He is characteristically hot-headed, and appears in most of Dietrich's fights and adventures. In the Nibelungenlied, he insists on attacking the Burgundians, despite Dietrich von Bern's reluctance to get involved in the conflict, after Rüdiger has been killed fighting them. He is killed by Giselher, whom he also kills.			Nibelungenlied, Þiðreks saga, Rosengarten zu Worms, Biterolf und Dietleib, Laurin, Virginal
Wolfwin	Middle High German: Wolfwîn		Wolf means "wolf", and the second element win means "friend".	One of the vassals of Dietrich von Bern. In the Nibelungenlied, he dies fighting the Burgundians. His familial relationships change in different epics: in Wolfdietrich w, he is the brother of Wolfhart and nephew of Hildebrand^{1}, in Biterolf und Dietleib he is the brother of Richart and Wolfwin, and in the Nibelungenklage he is the son of Nere.			Nibelungenlied, Nibelungenklage, Wolfdietrich, Alpharts Tod, Biterolf und Dietleib
Wonred	Old English: Wonrēd		It is a name that is otherwise unknown, and it means "want counsel". Won means "wanting", "void of".	The Geatish brothers Eofor and Wulf^{1} are called "sons of Wonred".	Beowulf		
Wulf^{1}	Old English: Wulf		From PN Wulfaz ("wolf").	Wulf ("wolf", a common Scandinavian name) appears with his brother Eofor ("wild boar"). It is peculiar that two brothers fight at the same time against an opponent (the Swedish king Ongentheow) and that only one of the names, Wulf, alliterate with that of the father. Cronan interprets it as a collation of the boar and the wolf, like the raven and the eagle in Germanic tradition, but Nerman notes that jǫfurr "boar" could mean "prince" in Scandinavian tradition, and so the name Eofor likely referred to Wulf^{1}, but the two names created Eofor as a doublet of Wulf^{1} in Beowulf. For killing Ongentheow in battle, he received the richest possible reward, the only daughter of king Hygelac.	Beowulf		
Wulf^{2}	Old English: Wulf		See Wulf^{1}	Eadwacer is mentioned in the lament ''Wulf and Eadwacer that is notoriously difficult to interpret.	Wulf and Eadwacer		
Wulfgar	Wulfgār		From PN Wulfagaizaz from *wulfaz meaning "wolf" and *gaizaz, which means "spear".	Wulgar greets Beowulf at Heorot. He is a Wendla lēod, a "man of the Wendels", who may be the inhabitants of Vendel (see Vendel Period) near Uppsala, in Sweden, those of Vendsyssel in northern Jutland, or the Vandals. According to Belden, Stjerna and Klaeber, his honoured position at the Danish court may be best explained as he and Weohstan belonging to an aristocratic Swedish clan which would have resided at Vendel in Sweden. During the Swedish civil war that ended in the Battle on the Ice of Lake Vänern, they sided with Onela, and after Eadgils victory they had to go into exile. Weohstan ended up with the Geats while Wulgar sought refuge among the Danes.	Beowulf		
Wulfhere	Old English: Wulfhere		The first element means "wolf", from PGmc *wulfaz, and the second element means "army" from PGmc *χarjaz or *χariz.	Appears in Widsith, line 119 as one of the two Gothic (Hræde) princes who fought the Huns in the Vistula Woods. The other prince was Wyrmhere, who appears as the Goth Ormar in Hervarar saga.	Widsith		
Wunderer	Early New High German Wunderer	The figure may derive from Arthurian traditions, but may also derive from native folklore.	The name is from MHG wunderære, which is used here synonymously with MHG wunder ("monster").	A cannibalistic monster who invades Attila's court and is then killed by Dietrich von Bern.			Wunderer
Wyrmhere				See Ormar			

== Y ==
Figure	Names in medieval languages	Historical origin	Name meaning	Relationships	Early and English Attestations	Norse Attestations	German Attestations
Yaroslav the Wise	Old Norse: Jarisleifr	Probably based on Yaroslav the Wise.	In Old Norse, the Slavic name was reinterpreted as jara ("fight") and leifr ("descendant").	In Guðrúnarkviða II and Völsunga saga, Jarisleifr appears as one of Gudrun's suitors. In his translation of Guðrúnarkviða II, Hollander considers the mention out of place and moves it to the notes, and Finch comments that it probably refers to Yaroslav the Wise who received help from his brother from Eymund who also appears as one of the suitors, Eymóðr.		Guðrúnarkviða II, Völsunga saga	
Yngvar	Old Norse: Yngvarr, Latin: Yngware	May be based on Ivar the Boneless.	See Ingvar.	In Ragnarssona þáttr, Yngvar and Husto are the sons of Ragnar Lodbrok by a concubine. When their half-brother Ivar the Boneless had conquered England, he had them torture Edmund the Martyr. The names Yngvar and Ivar may have been variant forms of the same name and so Yngvar may have originated in Ivar the Boneless himself. In Abbo of Fleury's Life of St. Edmund, it is reported that Edmund was killed by Yngware (probably Ivar) and Hubba.	Life of St. Edmund	Ragnarssona þáttr	
Yngvar (others)				For other figures named Yngvar, se Ingvar			
Yngvi^{1}	Old Norse: Yngvi, Latin: Ingo, Old Norse: Ingjaldr, Latin: Ingeldus	May be based on a historic 5th c. Swedish king.	Yngvi may be derived from the ethnonym Ingwianiz. The first element Ing- in Ingjaldr may be from a PGmc *Ingwia- with the genitive suffix from *Ingwaz an unattested Germanic god, or also from the ethnonym Ingwianiz, and the second element from *waldaz ("ruler").	A king of Sweden, who according to Íslendingabók, succeeded Agne (who succeeded Alrekr), but in Ynglinga saga, he was his grandson and the son of Alrekr. In Gesta Danorum he is duplicated as the two brothers Ingo and Ingeldus (Ingjaldr) and instead the son(s) of Alfr^{1} (Alverus) who in Ynglingatal is Yngvi's brother. Ingo and Yngvi are probably hypocorisms of an early form of Ingjaldr, who was probably the name of a historical Swedish king at Uppsala. Based on Snorri's retelling of Ynglingatal, he ruled together with his brother Alfr^{1}, but unlike the latter he preferred to pillage abroad. Alf^{1}'s wife Bera preferred the manly and outgoing Yngve to her timid and sullen husband Alfr^{1}, and she did not hide it. One evening when Alfr^{1} saw Yngvi converse with Bera, he unexpectedly pulled his sword and killed his brother with it, but before dying, Yngvi did the same with Alfr^{1}. Hervarar saga and Orvar-Odd's saga tell the legend of Yngvi's beautiful daughter Ingiborg and Hjalmar, her lover. The older version of Orvar-Odd's saga calls him Ingjald, but in the younger version his name has been changed to Hloðvér. According to the Skjöldunga saga, the Danish king Frodo III married Inga, the daughter of Ingo who was the son of Alricus (the 14th or 17th king of Sweden).		Íslendingabók, Ynglingatal, Historia Norwegiæ, Ynglinga saga, Skjöldunga saga, Gesta Danorum, Hervarar saga, Orvar-Odd's saga	
Yngvi^{2}	Old Norse: Yngvi		See Yngvi^{1}.	A son of king Hring^{1} who is allied with the kings Högni^{3} and Granmar. Before the impending battle with Helgi Hundingsbane, Hothbrodd asks the messengers to send for Hring^{1}'s sons Atli^{1}, Yngvi^{2} and Alfr^{6} the Hoary. Elias Wessén agrees with Sophus Bugge's identification of Hring as the Swedish king Sigurd Ring, and considers Atli^{2}, Yngvi^{2} and Alfr^{6} to be the same men as Áli, Yngvi and Alf of the Swedish Yngling dynasty who are counted among the warriors in the Battle of the Brávellir.		Helgakviða Hundingsbana I, Gesta Danorum (VIII), Sögubrot	
Yngvi^{3}	Latin: Ingvi and Ingvone		See Yngvi^{1}.	In Ad catalogum, Yngvi visits the great sacrifices at Skiringssal in Viken with his father the petty king Alf^{9} of Vendel, his brother Alf^{10} and sister Alfsol. Another visitor is Sigurd Ring (Sigvard Ring), the king of Sweden and Denmark, who falls in love with his sister Alfsol. Considering the king too old for Alfsol the brothers kill her by poisoning rather than seeing Sigurd have her. The wrinkled old king kills both Yngvi and Alf^{10} in a duel but is severely wounded himself.		Ad catalogum regum Sveciæ annotanda	
Yrmenlaf	Yrmenlāf		From *ermanaz/ermunaz ("great", "tall") and *-laibaz ("descendant", "heir").	Yrmenlaf was Æschere's elder brother. He is mentioned when Æschere is dead to add to the latter's importance. He appears to have been a well-known character to the audience that listened to Beowulf, although nothing else has survived about him.	Beowulf		
Yrsa	Old Norse: Yrsa, Latin: Ursula (Chronicon lethrense), Latin: Urse (Gesta Danorum), Old English: Yrs (not certain, but only emended from Beowulf)	Probably based on a Frankish woman captured in a raid, such as that of Hygelac	From an earlier Ursiō and a corresponding male Frankish name, Ursio is attested. It is based on Latin ursus ("bear").	In the Eddic poem Grottasǫngr, Yrsa's son is said to be both her son and her brother, and that this son/brother will avenge Halfdan. In Hrólfr Kraki's saga, the Danish king Helgi kidnaps and rapes Alof^{3} (Oluf), the warrior queen of Saxony which results in Yrsa. Later Helgi comes back and finds her (not knowing she is his daughter), marries her and she gives him the son Hrólfr Kraki. Then Alof^{3} goes to Denmark and tells them of their incest, after which Yrsa leaves Helgi, and later marries Aðils, the king of Sweden. In the Skjöldunga saga and Ynglinga saga, she was already married to Aðils (in the Ynglinga saga, version she is not given to him, but he captures her in Saxony), and Helgi kidnaps her in Sweden instead. In Danish sources, Alof^{3} is replaced by Thora, the daughter of earl Hrólfr of Lolland. When Helgi dies, she marries Aðils, the king of Sweden. According to Gesta Danorum, the incest is caused by the vengeful Thora who sends Yrsa to Helgi so he can rape her not knowing she is his daughter. In both Danish and Icelandic accounts, she is visited by her son/brother in Uppsala and she helps him escape with the Swedish kings treasures, and in the Danish, she also accompanies him in the escape. In the Chronicon lethrense and Skjöldunga saga, she and Aðis have the daughter Skuld. Damico, has suggested that Yrsa is Wealhþeow's true name, but most scholars accept Clarke's identification of Yrsa as the same woman as the unnamed sister of Heorogar, Hrothgar, and Halga, in Beowulf, who was married to the Swedish king.	Probably Beowulf (emended)	Hrólfr Kraki's saga, Skjöldunga saga, Ynglinga saga, Skáldskaparmál, Gróttasöngr, Chronicon lethrense, Gesta danorum	

== Sources ==
- Acker, Paul (2007). "Part I. "Fragments of Danish History" (Skjöldunga saga)". ANQ: A Quarterly Journal of Short Articles, Notes and Reviews. 20 (3): 3–9. doi:10.3200/ANQQ.20.3.3-9. S2CID 162198516.
- Amodio, Mark C. (2014). The Anglo Saxon Literature Handbook. Vol. 15 (1 ed.). John Wiley & Sons, Incorporated. ISBN 9781118286517.
- Anderson, Carl Edlund (1999). Formation and Resolution of Ideological Contrast in the Early History of Scandinavia (PDF) (Thesis). University of Cambridge.
- Biggs, Frederick M. (2003). "Hondscioh and Æschere in Beowulf". Neophilologus. 87 (4): 635–652. doi:10.1023/A:1025471415863. S2CID 159641273.
- Blomkvist, Nils (2005). Crawford, Barbara; Kirby, David; Sigurdsson, Jon-Vidar; Øye, Ingvild; Unger, Richard W.; Urbanczyk, Przemyslaw (eds.). The Discovery of the Baltic, The Reception of a Catholic World-System in the European North (AD 1075-1225). The Northern World, North Europe and the Baltic c. 400-1700 AD, Peoples, Economies and Cultures. Vol. 15. Brill: Leiden, Boston. ISBN 90-04-14122-7.
- Byock, Jesse (1990). The Saga of the Volsungs: The Norse Epic of Sigurd the Dragon Slayer. University of California Press. ISBN 0-520-23285-2.
- Byock, Jesse (1999). The Saga of King Hrolf Kraki. Penguin Classics. ISBN 014043593X.
- Clarke, M. G. (1911). Sidelights on Teutonic History During the Migration Period, being Studies of Beowulf and Other Old English Poems. Cambridge University Press.
- Cleasby, Richard; Vigfússon, Gudbrand (1874). An Icelandic-English dictionary. Oxford Clarendon Press.
- Cronan, Dennis (1993). "The rescuing sword". Neophilologus. 77 (3): 467–478. doi:10.1007/BF00999688. S2CID 162366030.
- Дегтярева, Л. И. (2010). "Немецкая ономастика в Сумской области". Філологічні трактати. 2 (3): 23–28.
- The Saga of the Volsungs (PDF). Translated by Finch, R. G. London and Edinburgh: Nelson. 1965.
- Heimskringla (PDF). Vol. 1. Translated by Finlay, Alison; Faulkes, Anthony. Viking Society for Northern Research, University College London. 2016. ISBN 978-0-903521-86-4.
- Finlay, Alison (2010). "The Saga of Ásmundr, Killer of Champions". In Martin, Arnold; Finlay, Alison (eds.). Making History, Essays on the Fornaldarsögur. Viking Society for Northern Research, University College, London. pp. 119–139. ISBN 978-0-903521-84-0.
- Friis-Jensen, Karsten, ed. (2015). Saxo Grammaticus Gesta Danorum, The History of the Danes. Vol. 1. Translated by Fisher, Peter. Oxford University Press. ISBN 978-0-19-82052-34.
- Friðriksdóttir, Jóhanna Katrín (2010). "Hyggin ok forsjál. Wisdom and Women's Counsel in Hrólfs saga Gautrekssonar". In Martin, Arnold; Finlay, Alison (eds.). Making History, Essays on the Fornaldarsögur. Viking Society for Northern Research, University College London. ISBN 978-0-903521-84-0.
- Förstemann, Ernst (1900). Altdeutsches Namenbuch, Band 1: Personennamen (2 ed.). Bonn: Bonn, P. Hanstein.
- Gentry, Francis G.; McConnell, Winder; Müller, Ulrich; Wunderlich, Werner, eds. (2011) [2002]. The Nibelungen Tradition. An Encyclopedia. New York, Abingdon: Routledge. ISBN 978-0-8153-1785-2.
- Ghosh, Shami (2007). "On the origins of Germanic heroic poetry: a case study of the legend of the Burgundians". Beiträge zur Geschichte der deutschen Sprache und Literatur. 129 (2): 220–252. doi:10.1515/BGSL.2007.220. S2CID 161148492.
- Gillespie, George T. (1973). Catalogue of Persons Named in German Heroic Literature, 700-1600: Including Named Animals and Objects and Ethnic Names. Oxford: Oxford University. ISBN 978-0-19-815718-2.
- Haymes, Edward (1988). The saga of Thidrek of Bern. Garland library of medieval literature. New York: Garland. ISBN 0824084896.
- Hellquist, Elof (1922). Svensk etymologisk ordbok. Lund: C.W.K. Gleerups förlag.
- Heusler, Andreas (1910). "Heldennamen in mehrfacher lautgestalt". Zeitschrift für deutsches Altertum. 52 (1/2): 97–107. JSTOR 20652404.
- The Poetic Edda. Translated by Hollander, Lee M. Texas University Press. 1928.
- Jiriczek, Otto Luitpold (1898). Deutsche Heldensagen, Band 1. Strasbourg: Karl Trübner. ISBN 9783112176429.
- Jochens, Jenny (1996). Old Norse Images of Women. University of Pennsylvania Press Philadelphia. ISBN 0-8122-3358-1.
- Jones, Gwyn (1969). A History of the Vikings. Oxford University Press.
- Kaufmann, Hennig (1968). Ergänzungsband zu Ernst Förstemann: Personennamen. Wilhelm Fink.
- Klaeber, Friedrich (2008). Fulk, R.D.; Bjork, Robert E.; Niles, John D. (eds.). Klaeber's Beowulf and The Fight at Finnsburg. University of Toronto Press. pp. 274–277. ISBN 978-0-8020-9843-6.
- Krause, Arnulf (2010). Reclams Lexikon der germanischen Mythologie und Heldensage. Reclam. ISBN 978-3-15-010778-2.
- Phelpstead, Carl, ed. (2001). A History of Norway and the Passion and Miracles of the Blessed Óláfr (PDF). Translated by Kunin, Devra. Viking Society for Northern Research. ISBN 978-0-903521-48-2.
- Leneghan, Francis (2020). Hines, John; Cubitt, Catherine (eds.). "The Dynastic Drama of Beowulf, Anglo-Saxon Studies 39". Anglo-Saxon Studies. Boydell & Brewer. ISSN 1475-2468.
- Malone, Kemp (1936). Wisith (1962 ed.). Rosenkilde and Bagger, Copenhagen.
- McKinnell, John (2005). Meeting the Other in Norse Myth and Legend. Cambridge: DS Brewer. ISBN 1-84384-042-1.
- McTurk, Rory (1991). Studies in Ragnars saga Loðbrókar and its Major Scandinavian Analogues. The Society for the Study of Mediæval Languages and Literature, Oxford. ISBN 0-907570-08-9.
- Miller, Clarence H. (2007). "Fragments of Danish History". ANQ: A Quarterly Journal of Short Articles, Notes and Reviews. 20 (3): 9–33. doi:10.3200/ANQQ.20.3.9-22. S2CID 161363696.
- Mueller, Eugen Hartmuth (1939). "Deutung einiger Namen im Nibelungenlied". Monatshefte für Deutschen Unterricht. 31 (6): 274–284. JSTOR 30169580.
- Murdoch, Brian (2004). "Gothic". In Murdoch, Brian; Read, Malcolm (eds.). Camden House History of German Literature, volume 1: Early Germanic Literature and Culture. Camden House. pp. 149–170. ISBN 1-57113-199-X.
- Naumann, Hans-Peter (2016). "Bósa saga ok Herrauðs". In Pulsiano, Philip; Wolf, Kirsten (eds.). Medieval Scandinavia, an Encyclopedia. New York: Routledge Revivals. p. 54. ISBN 978-1-315-16132-7.
- Neidorf, Leonard (2013a). "Beowulf before Beowulf: Anglo-Saxon Anthroponymy and Heroic Legend". The Review of English Studies. 64 (266): 553–573. doi:10.1093/res/hgs108.
- Neidorf, Leonard (2018a). "Beowulf as Pre-National Epic: Ethnocentrism in the Poem and its Criticism". ELH. 85 (4): 847–875. doi:10.1353/elh.2018.0031. S2CID 165792664.
- Neidorf, Leonard (2018b). "Wealhtheow and Her Name: Etymology, Characterization, and Textual Criticism". Neophilologus. 102 (1): 75–89. doi:10.1007/s11061-017-9538-4. S2CID 165875310.
- Nerman, Birger (1919). "Kung Agne och hans död på Agnefit". Fornvännen.
- Nerman, Birger (1925). Svenska rikets uppkomst. Stockholm: Generalstabens litografiska anstalt.
- Newton, Sam (1993). The Origins of Beowulf and the Pre-Viking Kingdom of East Anglia. Cambridge University Press. ISBN 9780859914727.
- Noreen, Adolf (1922). "Yngve". In Westrin, Th. (ed.). Nordisk Familjebok. Vol. 33 (2 ed.). p. 563.
- Olrik, Axel (1919). The Heroic Legends of Denmark. Translated by Hollander, Lee M. New York: The American-Scandinavian Foundation.
- Olson, Oscar Ludvig (1916). "The Relation of the Hrólfs saga kraka and the Bjarkarímur to Beowulf". Publications of the Society for the Advancement of Scandinavian Study. 3 (1): 1–104. JSTOR 40914974.
- Orel, Vladimir E. (2003). A Handbook of Germanic Etymology. Brill. ISBN 978-90-04-12875-0.
- Osborn, Marijane (2019). "The Alleged Murder of Hrethric in Beowulf". Traditio. 74: 153–177. doi:10.1017/tdo.2019.9. S2CID 210496115.
- Hrolf Gautreksson. Translated by Pálsson, Hermann; Edwards, Paul. Edinburg: Southside. 1972. ISBN 0-8020-1814-9.
- Seven Viking Romances. Translated by Pálsson, Hermann; Edwards, Paul. Penguin Group. 1985. ISBN 9780141966809.
- Peterson, Lena (2004). Lexikon över urnordiska personnamn. Uppsala: Institutet för språk och folkminnen.
- Peterson, Lena (2007). Nordiskt runnamnslexikon. Uppsala: Institutet för språk och folkminnen.
- Reichert, Hermann (1994). "Heime in Wilten und in der Thidrekssaga". In Uecker, Heiko (ed.). Studien zum Altgermanischen. Festschrift für Heinrich Beck. Walter de Gruyter. pp. 503–512.
- Rozano-García, Francisco J. (2019). "Unferþ maðelode - The Villain in Beowulf Reconsidered". English Studies. 100 (8): 941–958. doi:10.1080/0013838X.2019.1640051. S2CID 201430758.
- Schück, Henrik; Warburg, Karl (1985). Illustrerad svensk litteraturhistoria. Vol. 1 (3 ed.). Malmö: Gidlunds. ISBN 91-7844-027-0.
- Simek, Rudolf (1993). Dictionary of Northern Mythology. Translated by Hall; Angela. D. S. Brewer. ISBN 0-85991-369-4.
- Schneider, Hermann (1962). Germanische Heldensage, Bd. 1: Deutsche Heldensage (2 ed.). de Gruyter.
- Sundqvist, Olof (2002). Freyr's offspring, Rulers and religion in ancient Svea society. Uppsala universitet. ISBN 91-554-5263-9.
- The Saga of King Heidrek the Wise (PDF). Translated by Tolkien, Christopher. 1960.
- Uecker, Heiko (1972). Germanische Heldensage. Stuttgart: Metzler. ISBN 3476101061.
- Vikstrand, Per (2004). "Skúta and Vendil, Two Place Names in Ynglingatal". In van Nahl, Astrid; Elmevik, Lennart; Brink, Stefan (eds.). Namenwelten. Berlin, New York: Walter de Gruyter. ISBN 3-11-018108-8.
- de Vries, Jan (1962). Altnordisches Etymologisches Worterbuch (2000 ed.). Brill. ISBN 90-04-05436-7.
- The Sagas of Ragnar Lodbrok. Translated by Waggoner, Ben. New Haven: Troth Publications. 2009. ISBN 9780578021386.
- Wessén, Elias (1927). "Eddadikterna om Helge Hundingsbane". Fornvännen.
- Wessén, Elias (1952). Wessén, Elias; Helgason, Jón; Knudsen, Trygve; Skautrup, Peter (eds.). Ynglingsaga. Svenska bokförlaget Norstedts, Stockholm; Ejnar Munksgaard, København; Dreyers forlag, Oslo.
