= List of figures in Germanic heroic legend, Hi–Hy =

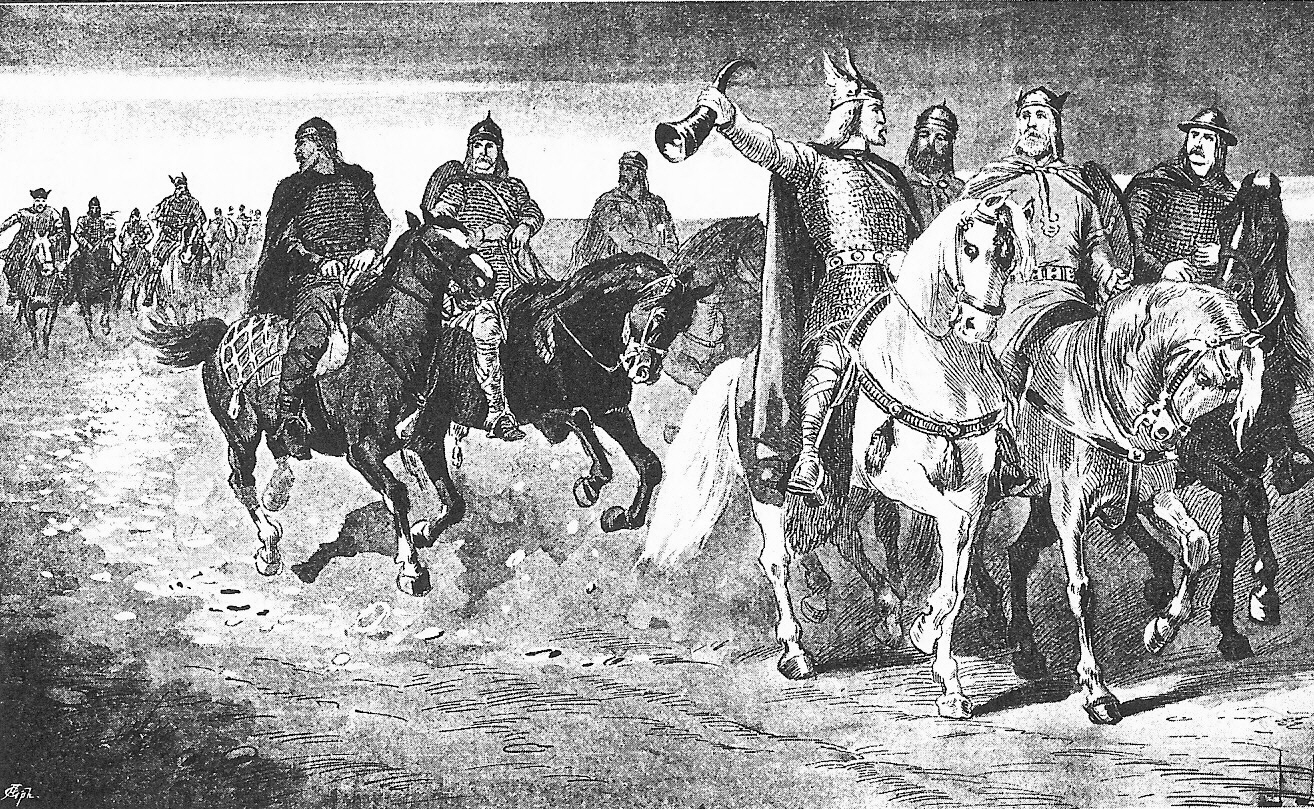
Hrólfr Kraki spreading gold to escape the Swedes, by Jenny Nyström (1895).

== Hi ==
Figure	Names in medieval languages	Historical origin	Name meaning	Relationships	Early and English Attestations	Norse Attestations	German Attestations
Hildebrand^{1}	Old High German: Hiltbrand, Middle High German: Hildebrand, Old Norse: Hildibrandr or Hildebrandr, Latin: Hildigerus (Gesta Danorum)	Disputed.	The first element is PGmc *hildjō- ("strife, conflict"), and the second element "sword" or "conflagration".	Instructor and mentor of Dietrich von Bern, son of Heribrand, father of Hadubrand, uncle of Wolfhart and Alphart. In the Hildebrandslied, Hildebrand^{1} is returning with an army to Italy when he encounters his son Hadubrand, against him he is forced to fight. In the Jüngeres Hildebrandslied, the fight ends in reconciliation. In the Nibelungenlied, he appears with Dietrich von Bern at Attila's hall and kills Kriemhild after she kills Hagen/Högni^{1}. In other epics, he leads Dietrich's men and teaches him how to be a warrior and ruler, including rescuing Dietrich from opponents. In Ásmundar saga kappabana, he is the half-brother of Ásmundr, who kills him.	Tale of Wade	Gesta Danorum, Ásmundar saga kappabana	Hildebrandslied, Nibelungenlied, Nibelungenklage, Þiðreks saga, Dietrichs Flucht, Rabenschlacht, Alpharts Tod, Rosengarten zu Worms, Eckenlied, Sigenot, Goldemar, Dietrich und Fasolt, Laurin, Virginal, Wunderer, Ermenrichs Tod, Heldenbuch-Prosa, Jüngeres Hildebrandslied
Hildeburh^{1}			The first element is PGmc *hildjō- "strife, conflict", the second one is PGmc *-berʒō or *-burʒō ("helper", "assistant").	Sister of Hnæf, wife of Finn^{1}. She had either been given as a peace-maker to the Frisian ruler Finn, or kidnapped by him. From that time, some twenty years should have passed when the Battle of Finnsburh starts between her husband and her brother, as one of her sons fall in the battle. She is taken back to the Danish lands together with the Frisian royal treasure.	Beowulf		
Hildeburg^{2}	Middle High German: Hildeburc, Old Norse: Hilldr		See Hildeburh^{1}	In Kudrun, she accompanies Kudrun when she is abducted by Hartmut and Ludwig. She eventually marries Hartmut. In Biterolf und Dietleib, Herbort relates how he abducted Hildeburg, daughter of Ludwig and sister of Hartmut. In the Þiðreks saga, a Hildr, who is the daughter of King Arthur, is abducted and married by the Herbort character.		See Hildeburh^{1}	Kudrun, Þiðreks saga
Hildeburg^{3}	Middle High German: Hildeburc		See Hildeburh^{1}	The wife of Hugdietrich and mother of Wolfdietrich. She is also the sister of Buðli (Botelung) in some versions. In one version, Hugdietrich's counselor Sabene^{2} tries to seduce her but fails. In another, Hugdietrich must free her from the tower where she has been locked by her father, Walgunt, in order to seduce and impregnate her with Wolfdietrich.			Wolfdietrich
Hildegund	Old English: *Hildegȳþ, Old Norse: Hilldigundr, Latin: Hiltgunt, Middle High German: Hildegund		First element PGmc *hildjō- ("strife, conflict"), second element from PGmc *gunð- ("war, battle").	Lover of Walter of Aquitaine. She is a hostage at Attila's court with Walter and Hagen/Högni^{1}. They escape Attila's court together and have a conflict with the Burgundians while crossing their territory.	Assumed to be the speaker in Waldere.		Waltharius, Þiðreks saga, Walther und Hildegund, Biterolf und Dietleib
Hildibrand^{2} the Great	Old Norse: Hildibrandr inn ríki		See Hildebrand^{1}.	Hildibrand^{2} is the father of Helgi and receives Helgi's son Hildibrandr^{1} as his foster-son to raise him among the Huns. When he receives his grandson he declares that the boy will grow up to become a hero.		Ásmundar saga kappabana	
Hildibrand^{3}	Old Norse: Hildibrandr		See Hildibrand^{1}.	When Harald Wartooth was the king of Denmark and Sweden, Hildibrand^{3} was a renowned warrior and a powerful king in Jutland. Eventually, he settled down and had the son Hildir^{2} and the daughter Hild^{5}. On his deathbed he told his son to be loyal to his father's friends, and also to marry off his beautiful but arrogant sister to a far-away place, not share any land with her and not give her any warriors. When Hildir^{2} had succeeded his father, his sister approached him and had a request, but what later happened to Hildir^{2} and Hildr^{5}, a story named "About the Eagerness of Hildr" is unfortunately lost due to a lacuna in the manuscript of Sögubrot.		Sögubrot	
Hildibrand^{4}	Old Norse: Hildibrandr		See Hildebrand^{1}.	Hildibrand^{4} was a berserker who was killed with eleven of his men by a twelve-year-old boy named Sigurd Hart.		Ragnarssona þáttr, Hálfdanar saga svarta	
Hildiguðr	Old Norse: Hildiguðr		For the etymology, see Hildegund.	The very beautiful daughter of Granmar, the king of Södermanland and Hildr^{4}. When the sea king Hjörvard^{2} Wulfing visits her father for a banquet, she offers him a toast in a silver goblet to the Wulfings. For her sake, he renounces the pirate custom of never drinking in pairs with women, and after having conversed with her, he asks the king for her hand which is accepted. He thereby enters an alliance with her father against the Swedish king Ingjald.		Ynglinga saga (37)	
Hildir^{1}	Old Norse: Hildir		From an earlier PN *Heldija- with ja-ablaut from PN *heldaʀ, which evolved into the ON word hjaldr ("discussion", "noise", "fight").	The son of Högni^{3}, the king of Östergötland, and the brother of Hildr^{4}. They are allies with Granmar, the king of Södermanland and Hjörvard^{2} Wulfing against king Ingjald of Sweden. They meet the much larger Swedish army in battle, and after having routed the warriors from Västergötland, Närke, Fjädrundaland and Attundaland, they force Ingjald to retreat. After a peace treaty, the Swedish king kills Granmar through arson and takes over Södermanland, but although, Högni and Hildir^{1} make frequent raids into Södermanland killing Ingjald's men, king Högni manages to defend his kingdom as long as he lives.		Ynglinga saga (38–39)	
Hildir^{2}			See Hildir^{1}.	When Harald Wartooth was the king of Denmark and Sweden, Hildibrand^{3} was a renowned warrior and a powerful king in Jutland. Eventually, he settled down and had the son Hildir^{2} and the daughter Hild^{5}. On his deathbed he told his son to be loyal to his father's friends, and also to marry off his beautiful but arrogant sister to a far-away place, not share any land with her and not give her any warriors. When Hildir^{2} had succeeded his father, his sister approached him and had a request, but what later happened to Hildir^{2} and Hildr^{5}, a story named "About the Eagerness of Hildr" is unfortunately lost due to a lacuna in the manuscript of Sögubrot.		Sögubrot	
Hildisvid		The name is likely the invention of the saga author.	For the first element is the genitive form of hildr ("battle") as used in compounds, and the second element svið means "a location".	The daughter of earl Rodgeir, she is abducted by Samson and bears him the children Dietmar and Ermanaric.			Þiðreks saga
Hildr^{1}	Old Norse: Hildr, Middle High German: Hilde	Possibly a historical figure from around the Baltic Sea, 4th century.	PGmc *hildjō- ("strife, conflict")	The daughter of Högni/Hagen^{2}, she is abducted by Heoden. An early version of the scene found on the picture stone Smiss I seems to show Hildr trying to mediate between the two sides, which is her role in the German versions. In Kudrun, she is successful in preventing the battle and becomes the mother of Kudrun, but an earlier version is alluded to in the Alexanderlied of Lamprecht (c. 1130) in which her father Hagen^{2} dies. In the attested Norse versions, each night, Hildr resurrects the fallen warriors, so they can fight again the next day, making the battle eternal. Simek considers that the myth of the resurrected warriors is probably based on a relatively widespread Celtic tradition.		Ragnarsdrápa, Gesta Danorum, Skáldskaparmál	Kudrun, Dukus Horant
Hildr^{2}	Old Norse: Hildr or Old Norse: Drótt, Latin: Drot		For the etymology of Hildr, see Hildr^{1}. The author of the saga has evidently replaced the unusual name Drótt ("band of warriors") found in his poetic source with the common name Hildr.	Hildr is the daughter of Buðli^{2}, the king of Sweden, who marries her to the Hunnish king Helgi Hildibrandsson, and they have the son Hildibrand^{1} (Hildigerus) who is sent to be raised by his grandfather Hildibrandr^{2}. When Helgi is away, the aging king is attacked by Danes and killed by the Danish king Álfr^{4} and his champion Áki^{1}, and they take Hildr^{2} away. Áki^{1} marries Hildr^{2} and they have the son Ásmundr.		Gesta Danorum, Ásmundar saga kappabanna	
Hildr^{3}, Hervor^{3}	Old Norse: Hildr		For the etymology of Hildr, see Hildr^{1}	In Hervarar saga, Hildr is the daughter of Heidrek Wolf skin and the mother of Halfdan the Valiant. In Hversu Noregr byggðist, she is called Hervor, daughter of Heidrek.		Hervarar saga, Hversu Noregr byggðist	
Hildr^{4}	Old Norse: Hildr		For the etymology of Hildr, see Hildr^{1}	The daughter of Högni^{3}, the king of Östergötland, and the sister of Hildir^{1}. She is married to her father's ally Granmar, the king of Södermanland. When Hjörvard^{2} Wulfing wants to marry their daughter Hildiguðr to seal an alliance against king Ingjald of Sweden, Granmar first asks for her opinion.		Ynglinga saga (37)	
Hildr^{5}			See Hildr^{1}.	When Harald Wartooth was the king of Denmark and Sweden, Hildibrand^{3} was a renowned warrior and a powerful king in Jutland. Eventually, he settled down and had the son Hildir^{2} and the daughter Hild^{5}. On his deathbed he told his son to be loyal to his father's friends, and also to marry off his beautiful but arrogant sister to a far-away place, not share any land with her and not give her any warriors. When Hildir^{2} had succeeded his father, his sister approached him and had a request, but what later happened to Hildir^{2} and Hildr^{5}, a story named "About the Eagerness of Hildr" is unfortunately lost due to a lacuna in the manuscript of Sögubrot.		Sögubrot	
Hjalli	Old Norse: Hjalli		From ON hilla ("shelf"), or from hjallr ("bed"), a typical thrall name.	A cowardly cook at the court of Atli (Attila) and whose heart is cut out to present it to Gunnar as belonging to Gunnar's brother Högni. In the Völsunga saga, his life is spared by the intervention of Högni who can't bear to hear Hjalli's sobbing, but Hjalli's heart is cut out anyway.		Atlakvíða, Atlamál, Völsunga saga	
Hjalmar	Old Norse: Hjálmarr		The first element Hialmʀ means "helmet", while the second element -arr can have three different origins: *-harjaʀ ("war chief, warrior"), *-warjaʀ ("defender") or *-ʒaiʀaʀ ("spear").	Hjalmar the Great-hearted was the champion of the Swedish king Ingjald (or Yngvi^{1}) at Uppsala, and in love with the king's daughter Ingeborg. However, the twelve berserker sons of Arngrim came to Uppsala and Hjörvard^{1} (or Angantyr^{2}) challenged him to a duel on Samsø for the hand of Ingeborg. During the holmgang, he fought Hjörvard^{1}'s brother Angantyr^{2} while his friend Orvar-Odd fought Hjörvard^{1} and the other ten brothers protected by a silken mailcoat. The twelve berserkers were slain, but Hjalmar died from the wounds of the cursed sword Tyrfing that Angantyr had wielded. Dying he sings Hjalmar's death song. Learning that her lover is dead, Ingeborg joins him in death.		Hervarar saga, Orvar-Odd's saga, Gesta Danorum	
Hjalmgunnar	Old Norse: Hjálmgunnarr		For the first element hjálmr ("helmet"), see Hjalmar, and for Gunnar, see Gunther/Gunnar.	King Hjalmgunnar who was an old and able warrior to whom Odin had promised victory in his war against king Agnar^{5}. However, Odin's Valkyrie Brynhild killed Hjalmgunnar instead. As punishment Odin pricked her with a sleep thorn and cursed her never to be victorious again, and that she would marry. Brynhild responded with an oath that she would never marry a man who could feel fear. In Norna-Gests þáttr identified as a Gothic warrior.		Sigrdrífumál, Helreið Brynhildar, Völsunga saga, Norna-Gests þáttr	
Hjalti/Hött	Old Norse: Hjalti/Hǫttr		Hjalti is a nickname from hjalt meaning the "boss or knob at the end of a sword's hilt", but "also the guard between the hilt and the blade". Hǫttr means "hood".	One of Hrólfr Kraki's champions. He is initially very cowardly, but Bodvar Bjarki cures him of his cowardice. Hrólfr kraki (Hróðulf), lends Hött his sword "Golden hilt" and Hött uses it to "kill" the troll that terrorizes the Danes. Bödvar Bjarki had already killed it, but left it to look alive so that Hött could "slay" it. King Hrólfr understands the ruse but keeps the secret, and names Hött Hjalti after the sword. It is considered to be the same sword as the giant-sword "Golden Hilt" with which the hero Beowulf slays Grendel's mother in Beowulf.		Gesta Danorum, Hrólfs saga kraka	
Hjördís/Sieglinde	Middle High German: Sigelint, Old Norse: Hiǫrdís or Old Norse: Sisibe (Þiðreks saga)		The MHG name from OHG sigu- ("victory") and lindi ("soft"), with a possible connection to OHG lint ("dragon"). The name Hjördís means "sword woman" in Old Norse. The first element of the name Sisibe is sīsi-, a form of sigis (i.e. sigu) that shows Romance-language influence and is found in Visigothic, Burgundian, Swabian, and West Frankish names.	Mother of Sigurd/Siegfried. In Dietrichs Flucht, also the sister of Ortnit. In Norse tradition, she is the daughter of king Eylimi, and she gives birth to Sigurd after his father Sigmund's death. She remarries Alf^{3}, the son of king Hjalprekr of Denmark. In the Þiðreks saga, Sisibe is falsely accused by Sigmund's vassals Hartwin and Herman of adultery while pregnant and forced to flee and give birth to Siegfried in the woods. She places the baby in a basket, sets it in a stream, and then dies.		Skáldskaparmál, Völsunga saga, Hyndluljóð (26), Frá dauða Sinfjötla, Grípispá, Norna-Gests þáttr	Nibelungenlied, Þiðreks saga, Lied vom Hürnen Seyfrid, Heldenbuch-Prosa.
Hjörleif, Leif	Old Norse: Hiǫrleifr, Old Norse: Herleifr, Latin: Herlewar Old Norse: Leifr		Hjör- is from PN *heruz ("sword") and leifr is from PN *laibaʀ ("remnant", "heir").	In Helgakviða Hundingsbana I, Helgi Hundingsbane asks Hjörleif if he has mustered the force, and he answers that there are 1200 warriors in Orva Sound, and more than 1800 in Hátun. In the Völsunga saga, he is instead called Leif and gives much larger figures telling that there are 12 000 warriors in Norva Sound, and an even larger force elsewhere. He is also mentioned among the participants in the Battle of the Brávellir.		Helgakviða Hundingsbana I, Völsunga saga (8), Gesta Danorum (VIII), Sögubrot	
Hjort	Old Norse: Hjǫrtr, Latin: Hort		The name means "hart, stag" (red deer). His name has been connected to Heorot.	In Sögubrot, Hjort is a warrior fighting on Danish king Harald Wartooth's side at the massive Battle of Brávellir against the Swedish king Sigurd Ring. Hjort is a member of Harald's house guard and takes on the legendary giant warrior Starkad, but is killed. In Gesta Danorum Hort arrives from the Danish royal seat Lejre, and is one of several warriors sequentially killed by Starkad.		Sögubrot, Gesta Danorum (VIII)	
Hjörvard^{1} Arngrimsson	Old Norse: Hiǫrvarðr Arngrimsson		PN *Heruwarduz from *heruz ("sword") and *warduz ("guard, protector").	One of twelve brothers and berserkers who were the sons of Arngrim. Although only twelve they were famous and formidable, never losing battles, and kings were eager to employ them. One Yule, he (or Angangtyr) made a bragarfull vow to marry Ingibjörg, the daughter of the Swedish king Ingjald (or Yngvi^{1}) or no one else. However, at Uppsala, the king's champion Hjálmar the Great-hearted contested this and Ingibjörg wanted him, and so Hjörvard challenged him to a duel on Samsø. During the holmgang, he and his brothers are killed by Hjálmar and Orvar-Odd.		Hervarar saga, Orvar-Odd's saga, Gesta Danorum	
Hjörvard^{2} Wulfing	Old Norse: Hiǫrvarðr ylfingr		See Hjörvard Arngrimsson above.	In Ynglinga saga, he marries Hildegunn, the daughter of king Granmar of Södermanland. Granmar appoints him his successor and together they fight a defensive war against king Ingjald Ill-ruler of Sweden, allied with Högni^{3} king of Östergötland. Ingjald kills both Hjorvard^{2} Wulfing and Granmar on the island of Selaön through arson. Sögubrot says that he had a son named Hjormund who was appointed ruler of Östergötland by king Harald Wartooth, because Hjorvard^{2} Wulfing's father had been its king.		Ynglinga saga, Sögubrot af nokkrum fornkonungum	
Hjörvard^{3}	Old Norse: Hiǫrvarðr		See Hjörvard^{1}	Hjörvard was the son of a king named Hunding who was killed by Sigmund's son Helgi, who thus earned himself the cognomen Hundingsbane. Helgakviða Hundingsbana I tells that Helgi refused to give his sons compensation, and so they attacked him but were defeated. In Helgakviða Hundingsbana I and II the brothers are named Alf^{2} and Eyjolf, Hjorvard^{3} and Havard, but in The Völsunga saga, the names Hervard^{2} and Hagbard^{2} appear instead of Hjörvard and Havard. Helgakviða Hundingsbana II adds a brother named Heming, and the Völsunga saga adds yet another brother called king Lyngvi who killed Sigmund in battle. According to the Völsunga saga, Hjörvard was killed together with Lyngvi while defending against Sigurd who wanted to avenge his father Sigmund. Norna-Gests þáttr tells that in the first battle against Helgi Hundingsbane, Eyjolf, Hervard and Hjörvard were slain, but Lyngvi, Alf and Heming escaped to be killed later in battle against Sigurd.		Helgakviða Hundingsbana I, Helgakviða Hundingsbana II, Völsunga saga, Norna-Gests þáttr	
Hjörvard^{4}	Old Norse: Hiǫrvarðr		See Hjörvard^{1}	In Helgakvíða Hjörvarðssonar, Hjörvard is a king in Norway who had four wives. With Alfhild^{2} he had son named Hedin, with Særeid a son named Humlung, and with Sinriód a son named Hymling. He wanted his fourth wife to be the most beautiful woman and it was Sigrlinn, the daughter of king Svafnir of Svavaland. He sent Atli, the son of his jarl Ithmund, to negotiate with Svafnir, but Franmar, the girl's foster-father advised against it. Franmar had previously appeared to Atli in the form of a bird demanding and exorbitant price for her. Hjörvard and Atli ride to Svavaland and find it being invaded and pillaged by Sigrlinn's second suitor Hrothmar who has already killed Svafnir. They find the house where Franmar has hidden Sigrlinn and his daughter Álof^{1}, and where he is magically protecting them in the form of an eagle. Atli kills him and then Atli marries Álof^{1} and Hjörvard marries Sigrlinn with whom he has the son Helgi Hjörvardsson, the hero of Helgakvíða Hjörvarðssonar.		Helgakvíða Hjörvarðssonar	
Hlaðguðr svanhvít	Old Norse: Hlaðguðr svanhvít		First name "weaver of battle" from ON hlaða ("to weave") and guðr ("battle). Jan de Vries instead suggested that the first element meant "headdress". The second name means "swan-white".	A valkyrie and swan maiden, wife of Slagfidr.		Völundarkviða.	
Hljod	Old Norse: Hljóð		The name means "sound" or "hearing", from PGmc *χleuþan.	A Valkyrie and the daughter of the giant Hrímnir. When the Hunnish king Rerir and his queen were unable to conceive, Odin and Frigg heard their prayer and sent an apple with Hjlod in the shape of a crow to Rerir. The queen became pregnant with Völsung, but he stayed in her womb for six years until his mother asked to have him cut out of her. Völsung grew to be big and strong and when he was a grown man Hrímnir sent his to daughter to him to be his wife. They had 10 children and among them the twins Sigmund and Signy.		Völsunga saga.	
Hlöd	Old Norse: Hlǫðr, possibly Old English: Hliþe.	Unknown, possibly a historical figure from modern Ukraine.	The name means "destroyer, vanquisher", to compare with his opponent Heiðrekr that means "king of the heathlands (the steppe)".	King Heidrek of the Goths kidnaps the Hunnish princess Sifka whom he rapes then sends back pregnant with Hlöd, to be raised by Sifka's father Humli. When Heidrek dies, Hlöd visits his half-brother Angantýr^{1} to claim half of the Gothic kingdom. According to Germanic tradition, he is offered a third of the kingdom, which he refuses. His Hunnish grandfather Humli declares a large-scale invasion. In the first battle Hlöd's half-sister Hervor^{1} is killed, but in the end his half-brother Angantýr wins the war and both Hlöd and Humli are killed.	Possibly in Widsith.	Hervarar saga	
Hlodvard's sons	Old Norse: Hlǫðvarðs synir		Hlǫðr means "murderer, killer", while varðr is from *warduz ("guard, protector").	In Helgakvíða Hjörvarðssonar, Hrimgerth brags that she had drowned Hlodvard's sons. Nothing else has survived about those characters.		Helgakvíða Hjörvarðssonar	
Hlodver	Old Norse: Hlǫðvér	The name refers to kings of the Franks.	Derived from Frankish Chlodowich, which meant "glorious fighter". The first element of the Frankish form is derived from PGmc *χluđaz ("famous"), but in the Norse form the first element is not the same, see Hlöd, above. The second element of the Norse form, -vér, is either from PGmc *wīhaz, probably meaning "priest", or an agent noun of a verb cognate with Gothic weihan ("fight"), and would thus mean "fighter".	He is mentioned in Guðrúnarkviða II in a subordinate role. Hollander comments that as the Franks were neighbours with the Burgundians they may be referred to as their vassals.		Guðrúnarkviða II, Völundarkviða, Norna-Gests þáttr	
Hnæf	Old English: Hnæf	Possibly originally a historical person, but absent from Danish sources.	Possibly from ON hnefi, Old Swedish næfve ("fist").	King of the Danes, brother-in-law of Finn^{1}. Hnæf was invited to his Frisian brother-in-law Finn with 60 other Danes. In the morning, they are attacked in the Frisian hall and they defend themselves for five days without losses, but eventually Hnæf is slain. Finn has so few men left that he is unable to continue the attack, so he has to agree on peace with Hnæf's successor Hengest. The legend of Hnæf and his father Hoc was so widespread that they were included in an 8th c. Alemannic ducal line.	Finnsburg Fragment, Beowulf, Widsith (29), Gesta Hludowici imperatoris		
Hniflungr (Aldrian^{2})	Old Norse: Hniflungr or Old Norse: Niflungr; Old Norse: Aldrian		For Aldrian, see Aldrian^{1} "Hniflungr" means "small nail" and is probably derived from hnefi (see Hnæf).	The son of Hagen/Högni^{1}. He takes revenge on Attila for the death of his father.		Atlamál, Völsunga saga	Þiðreks saga
Hoc	Old English: Hōc, Middle High German: Hûc		The name is from *χōkaz ("hook").	The father of Hnæf and Hildeburh in Beowulf. He is briefly referenced as a Danish king in medieval German epic. The legend of Hoc and his son Hnæf was so widespread that they were included in an 8th c. Alemannic ducal line.	Beowulf, Widsith (29), Gesta Hludowici imperatoris		Biterolf und Dietleib, Eckenlied, Heldenbuch-Prosa
Höfund	Old Norse: Hǫfundr		The name means "author" or "judge", from hefja ("heave") and the suffix -undr, which is a present participle in a construction comparable to the Gothic nēhwundja ("neighbour").	He is the good-hearted son of Gudmund of Glæsisvellir, and his trusted advisor. After a visit by the shieldmaiden Hervor^{2} during which she kills one of their courtiers, Höfund decides with his father that she should be his future wife. She accepts the proposal and they have the children Heidrek and Angantyr^{3}. When he is king, his ill-natured son Heidrek unintentionally kills his own brother, at a feast, and so Höfund has to banish his own son from his kingdom.		Hervarar saga	
Högni^{3}	Old Norse: Hǫgni		Disputed, possibly based on PGmc *hag- "hedge", a proposed PGmc *haganaz (breeding animal/boar), or related to ON hagr ("service"). Hag- also means "fenced area" so it may mean "protector".	According to Ynglinga saga, king of Östergötland. He was allied to king Granmar of Södermanland who had married his daughter Hildr. They fought a defensive war against the Swedish king Ingjald Ill-ruler, and after Ingjald had killed Granmar through arson, Högni kept defending Östergötland, together with his son Hilder, until his death . Sögubrot tells that Harald Wartooth appointed Hjörvard^{2} Wulfing's son Hjörmund as the ruler of Östergötland which had belonged to Hjörvard^{2} Wulfing's father and to Granmar. According to the Völsunga saga and the Helgi lays, Högni is the father of Sigrún who is betrothed to Granmar's son Hothbrodd, but coveted by Helgi Hundingsbane who starts a war against Granmar's sons. Helgakviða Hundingsbana II also adds the sons Bragi and Dag, and the latter would avenge his father by sacrificing to Odin and kill Helgi at a location named Fjoturlund.		Ynglinga saga, Sögubrot af nokkrum fornkonungum, Völsunga saga, Helgakviða Hundingsbana I, Helgakviða Hundingsbana II.	
Holen	Old English: Holen		The name may mean "protector", based on helan ("protect") and geholen ("protector"). His name has been interpreted as "holly", but that would not have been a suitable name for a king.	Appears in Widsith, line 33, as a king of the Wrosnan. He is otherwise unknown.	Widsith		
Hondscioh	Old Norse: Hondscioh		Hondscioh is a Hapax legomenon in Old English that only appears in line 2076 in Beowulf. The name means "glove", cf. Continental Scandinavian handske, Modern Icelandic hanzki, Old High German hantscuoh, and Middle Dutch hantscoe.	Hondscioh is one of the Geatish warriors who follow Beowulf to king Hrothgar, and when Grendel arrives at Heorot he devours Hondscioh whole.	Beowulf		
Hord	Old Norse: Hǫrðr		The name means "hard", or a man from Hordaland, or it means "forest", and is the same word as in Hordaland and Harudes, see also Hæreð.	In Sögubrot, Hord is the foster-father of Ivar Vidfamne. During the voyage when Ivar wants to recuperate his escaped daughter Auðr from Ráðbarðr, the king of Gardariki, Ivar has a dream and asks his foster-father about its meaning. Hord answers that various people he has dreamt of represent Norse gods, Halfdan the Valiant was Baldr, Hrœrekr was Hœnir, Helgi was Hermóðr, Guðröðr was Heimdallr and finally he answers that Ivar himself is the Midgard Serpent. Ivar attacks him and Hord jumps into the sea, but Ivar jumps after him and both disappear.		Sögubrot	
Hornboge	Middle High German: Hornboge, Old Norse: Hornbogi		The name means "hornbow" and, by extension, "bowman" in MHG.	In German sources, one of Attila's vassals and a leader of the Wallachians/Vlachs. In the Þiðreks saga, he is a Wend and one of Dietrich's men.			Nibelungenlied, Nibelungenklage, Þiðreks saga, Biterolf und Dietleib
Hothbrodd	Old Norse: Hǫðbroddr, Latin: Hothbroddus	Several scholars suggest that he is a memory of the Heaðobards, but Wessén notes that this is contradicted by -broddr instead of -barðr.	The first element is from *haþu- ("battle") and the second from broddr ("spike"), from PGmc *bruzđaz ("spike").	In the Helgi lays and in Völsunga saga, he is the son of Granmar, but while the Helgi lays name his brother Gudmund^{2}, he has erroneously been renamed Granmar in the Völsunga saga, or it is his father Granmar who takes his place, and the lays have also added the hero Starkad as a third son. In the saga and the lays, Hothbrodd had been betrothed to the Valkyrie Sigrún, the daughter of Högni^{3}, but Sigrún told Helgi Hundingsbane that she would rather marry him instead. Helgi wages war on Hothbrodd and his brothers and kills them, after which he marries Sigrún. In the Danish Gesta Danorum, he was a Swedish king who killed Roe (Hrothgar), but who was in turn killed by Roe's brother Helgi (Halga), who could add the epithet "Hothbrodd's-bane" to "Hundingsbane". It also adds that Hothbrodd was the son of the Swedish king Regnerus (Ragnar), and the father of Adislus (Eadgils) and Hotherus (Ohthere). He is also mentioned in Gesta Danorum as a participant in the Battle of Brávellir.		Helgakviða Hundingsbana I, Helgakviða Hundingsbana II, Völsunga saga, Gesta Danorum, Chronicon Lethrense and the included Annales Lundenses	
Hrethel	Old English: Hrēðel	Beowulf is generally considered to be based on historic people and events.	Hrēðel is either PN *Hrōþilaz or *Hrōþila which are derived with the diminutive suffixes -*ilaz and -*ilan from names with *Hrōþi- such as *Hrōþigaizaz, *Hrōþiharjaz or *Hrōþiwarjaz, for their meanings see Hrothgar below.	King of the Geats and the father of Hygelac, Herebeald, Hæþcyn and an unnamed daughter who married Ecgþēow, Beowulf's father. He died from grief when his son Hæþcyn accidentally killed Herebeald with an arrow. He was succeeded by Hygelac.	Beowulf		
Hreðric	Old English: Hrēðrīk, Latin: Røricus, Old Norse: Hrærekr, Old Norse: Rørik		The first element Hrōð- is from PN *hrōþi- meaning "fame", and the second element is from PN *rīkia- ("powerful", "prominent", "rich") or from *rīkaz ("ruler").	In Beowulf Hreðrik and Hroðmund are the sons of king Hrothgar. Only Hreðrik survives in Scandinavian tradition and he appears as Røricus in Gesta Danorum and as Bøki avari ("Rørik son of the avaricious Bøk") in Bjarkamál, and where the father's name can be explained as a misinterpretation of his epithet in ON, hnøggvanbaugi ("ring stingy"). This epithet survives in Langfeðgatal where a Skjöldung (Scylding) named Hrærekr hnøggvanbaugi is the successor of Hrólfr kraki (Hroðulf), who in other sources is also called Ringslinger. In Gesta Danorum, the early ringslinger is the son of the Swedish king Höðr (who took over Denmark and Sweden after the death of Hiartvar (Heoroweard), and who is the maternal grandfather of Amleth. The Skjöldunga saga and Bjarkarímur tell of ringslinger in the same context, who is the son of Ingeld and kill Roar (Hrothgar) and after Hrólf's death (and Hiartwar/Heoroweard's), he rules with Hrólf's son. There is an account where he throws a ring into the sea (Svíagriss), but in Holfs saga kraka, he is renamed Hrók.	Beowulf	Gesta Danorum, Bjarkamál, Bjarkarímur, Langfeðgatal, Skjöldunga saga	
Hreiðmarr	Old Norse: Hreiðmarr		The meaning of the first element hreiðr is contested, but it may be mean "home" and be derived from the meaning "bird's nest". The second element marr is from PN *māriʀ ("excellent").	A shape-shifter with three sons who are also shape-shifters, Fafnir, Regin and Ótr, and the daughters Lyngheid and Lofnheid (the daughters are only in Reginsmál). When Ótr ("Otter") has been killed by Loki in company with Odin and Hönir, Hreidmar wants as compensation the cursed hoard of gold (including the cursed ring Andvaranaut) that is guarded by the dwarf Andvari. Soon Hreidmar is killed by Fafnir who is greedy for the gold and turns himself into a dragon to guard it. Regin who wants both the gold and revenge becomes Sigurd's foster-father and eventually persuades him to kill Fafnir.		Reginsmál, Völsunga saga, Norna-Gests þáttr	
Hrimgerth	Old Norse: Hrímgerðr		Hrímr means "hoarfrost", while gerðr is derived from garðr, a fenced-in area.	In Helgakvíða Hjörvarðssonar, Hrimgerth was the daughter of Hati, a giant who was killed by its hero Helgi Hjörvarðsson, at a fjord named after the giant. Hrímgerth was upset and started a raunchy flyting contest with Helgi and his companion Atli^{2} that ended with Hrimgreth being caught by sunrise and turning to stone.		Helgakvíða Hjörvarðssonar	
Hrimnir	Old Norse: Hrímnir		Hrímr means "hoarfrost".	Hrímnir is a giant. In Hyndluljóð (32), he is the father of Heiðr and Hrossþjófr. In Gríms saga loðinkinna, he is married to the giantess Hyrja and the father of Feima and Kleima. In the Völsunga saga, he is the father of the Valkyrie Hljod. When the Hunnish king Rerir and his queen were unable to conceive, Odin and Frigg heard their prayer and sent an apple with the Valkyrie Hljod in the shape of a crow to Rerir. The queen became pregnant with Völsung, but he stayed in her womb for six years until his mother asked to have him cut out of her. Völsung grew to be big and strong and when he was a grown man, Hrímnir sent his daughter Hljod to him to be his wife.		Völsunga saga, Prose Edda (Þulur), Gríms saga loðinkinna, Skírnismál (28), Hyndluljóð (32)	
Hringr^{1}	Old Norse: Hringr		The name is derived from PN *hrengaz ("ring").	A king who is allied with the kings Högni^{3} and Granmar. Before the impending battle with Helgi Hundingsbane, Hothbrodd asks the messengers to send for Hring's sons Atli^{2}, Yngvi^{2} and Alfr^{6} the Hoary. Elias Wessén agrees with Sophus Bugge's identification of Hring as the Swedish king Sigurd Ring, and considers Atli^{2}, Yngvi^{2} and Alfr^{6} to be the same men as Áli, Yngvi and Alf of the Swedish Yngling dynasty who are counted among the warriors in the Battle of the Brávellir.		Helgakviða Hundingsbana I	
Hringr^{2}	Old Norse: Hringr		See Hringr^{1}	A king in Norway and the grandfather of Bodvar Bjarki.		Hrolfs saga kraka	
Hroðmund	Old English: Hrōðmund, Old Norse: Hrómundr harði?		The first element Hrōð- is from PN *hrōþi- meaning "fame", and mund is from PN *munduz, meaning "protection".	In Beowulf Hreðrik and Hroðmund are the sons of king Hrothgar. The only survival of him in Scandinavian tradition may be the mentioning of Hrómundr harði as the first of Hrólfr kraki's champions in Hrólfs saga kraka.	Beowulf	Possibly Hrólfs saga kraka	
Hroald Toe	Old Norse: Hróaldr tá, Latin: Rolder		The first element Hró- is from Hróðr meaning "fame", from PN *hrōþiʀ ("fame"). The second element -aldr is from valdr meaning "ruler", from PGmc *waldaz.	He appears at the massive Battle of Brávellir as one of the Swedish king Sigurd Ring's warriors in the battle against the Danish king Harald Wartooth. He was one of the archers sent from Telemark, and the Swedes expected little from these archers that they held to be slow speaking drawlers. During the battle, Ubbi, on the Danish side, cleared a path in his wake with one sword in each hand and blood up to his shoulders. Having killed six champions and wounded 11, he went straight for the archers, so Hroald and Hadd shot 24 arrows in chest and killed him, which took a while. In Gesta Danorum, the archers are described a brave but humble. Seeing Ubbi having killed 25 champions and wounded 11 among the Swedes and the Geats, Haddir, Roald and Grettir stopped the massacre by showering the warrior with arrows and he died having been riddled with 144 arrows, an event that turned the battle against the Danes.		Sögubrot, Gesta Danorum (VIII)	
Hrœrekr Ringslinger	Old Norse: Hrœrekr slöngvanbaugi, Old Norse: Rørik Slængeborræ	May be based on Hreðric in Beowulf.	For the meaning of Hrœrekr, see Hreðric above. The epithet means "ringslinger".	The accounts vary greatly. Sögubrot tells of a Hrœrekr who married Auðr the Deep-Minded, although it was his brother Helgi and Auðr who wanted each other, a situation connived by Auð's father Ivar Vidfamne. Hrœrekr and Auðr had the son Harald Wartooth, whose son was named Hrœrekr Ringslinger. In Njáls saga, Hversu and Hyndluljóð, it was instead the first Hrœrekr, Harald Wartooth's father, who was called Hrœrekr Ringslinger. This first Hrœrekr (Ringslinger) was tricked by his father-in-law Ivar to believe that Auðr and Helgi were unfaithful and killed his brother. Ivar then took advantage of the situation and killed Hrœrekr, which caused Auðr to flee with her son Harald Wartooth to Ráðbarðr in Gardariki. Langfeðgatal mentions this late Ringslinger, but also an earlier (Beowulf era) Hrærekr hnøggvanbaugi ("ring stingy") who in other sources is also called Ringslinger, see Hreðrik.		Sögubrot, Njáls saga, Hversu Noregr byggðist, Hyndluljóð	
Hrok	Old Norse: Hrókr	Appears to be based on the other legendary character Hrœrekr Ringslinger.	The name means "shag".	The son of Saevil and Signy^{3}. He demands a precious ring from his uncle Hroar (Hrothgar), but then throws it into the sea when he cannot have it. Hroar cuts off his foot, and Hrok kills him and usurps his kingdom. He is badly beaten by his uncle Helgi (Halga) after that.		Hrólfs saga kraka	
Hrólfr Gautreksson	Old Norse: Hrólfr Gautreksson, Hrólfr inn gamli		The name Hrólfr is from PN *Hrōþiwulfaz, meaning "fame wolf"	Hrólf is the son of the Geatish king Gautrek, and his second wife Ingibjorg, the daughter of Thorir, a chieftain in Sogn. Hrólf has an older brother, Ketil, but everyone, even the brother, agrees that Hrólf should succeed their father. His first adventure is wooing Þornbjorg, the daughter of the Swedish king Eric, who is a shield-maiden. He wins her after having fought against her. The second adventure is helping Ketill marry Alof, the daughter of the Russian king Harald. The third and most dangerous adventure is in Ireland helping his blood-brother Ásmund marry the daughter of the king of Ireland. Hrólf ruled for a very long time and became an old man. He is mentioned in Hyndluljóð as Hrolf the Old, together with his housecarls Thorir Iron-Shield, Grim the Hardy, Gunnar Midwall, Ulf the Gaping, Brodd and Harvi, of whom the first two also appear in Hrólfs saga Gautrekssonar.		Hrólfs saga Gautrekssonar, Hyndluljóð	
Hrólfr Kraki	Old Norse: Hrólfr Kraki, Old English: Hrōðulf, Old English: Hrōðwulf, Latin: Rolfo Krake or Roluo Krake	No historical origin has been identified, but Hrolfr's career is probably based on competition between the Danes, Swedes, and other Germanic peoples in the sixth century.	For the meaning of Hrólfr, see Hrólfr Gautreksson, above. His epithet kraki means "rod" or "pole".	A Danish king of the Scylding dynasty, the nephew of Hrothgar, and the son of King Helgi and his daughter Yrsa. After Helgi dies in battle, the Swedish king Eadgils marries Yrsa and then asks Hrolfr for help against Àli/Onela, and Hrolfr fights for him the Battle on the Ice (In Beowulf done by Geats). He visits Eadgils in Uppsala, but flees with his gold and spreads the stolen gold behind himself to escape. In Danish sources he conquers Sweden giving to Hereoweard, as fief. He is finally betrayed by Heoroweard, but Vögg avenges him.	Beowulf, Widsith (lines 45–49)	Chronicon Lethrense and Annales Lundenses, Gesta danorum, Hrólfs saga kraka, Landnámabók, Ynglinga saga, Skáldskaparmál, Skjöldunga saga, Gróttasöngr (Yrsa's son), Gautrek's saga	
Hrólfr the Marksman/Bowman/Swift-handed	Old Norse: Hrólfr Skjótandi	The name is probably not authentic.	See above.	One of Hrólfr kraki's champions. He is mentioned in one of the few surviving stanzas from Bjarkamál that were recited at dawn before the Battle of Stiklestad, and they concern the last battle of Hrólfr kraki and the Skjöldungs: Hárr the Hard-gripper,/Hrólfr the Marksman,/Noble-born warriors/Who never will flee!/Not for wine do I wake you /Nor for women's lore,/Nay, I wake you for warfare,/The hard battle-play. He also appears in the last battle in Hrólfs saga kraka, but his companion Hárr has been replaced by Hrómundr harði, Svipdag^{2} and Beigaðr and Hvítserkr^{1}, Haklangr, Harðrefill, Haki^{2}, Vǫtt, Storolfr, Hjalti and Bödvar Bjarki.		Hrólfs saga kraka, Bjarkamál	
Hrollaugr	Old Norse: Hrollaugr		From hróðr and laugr with assimilation of -ðl- into -ll-. Hróðr means "fame" from PN *hrōðiʀ and laugr means "promised to" or "initiated to" from PGmc -*lauʒ, related to Gothic liugan "give a sacred vow" or "to marry".	The king of Garðar (Rus'). The R version and the HU versions give different accounts on his interaction with Heidrek. No names appear in the R version, but in the HU versions he is called Hrollaugr, his son is named Herlaug, and his daughter is called Hergerd. Only the U version names his queen, Herborg.		Hervarar saga	
Hromund Gripsson	Old Norse: Hróðmundr Gripsson		See Hroðmund above.	There was an early 12th c. saga, about Hromund Gripson that has been lost but which was preserved in a late medieval rhyme called Griplur, which was rewritten in the 17th c. as a saga. Enough has been preserved in Þorgils saga ok hafliða for scholars to retrieve parts of the original legend. It was about king Ólafr and his men including Hrómundr, a battle in the Gothenburg archipelago (Elfarsker) between Hrǫgviðr and the king, in which Hrómundr kills the former. During a Viking raid led by Ólafr, Hrómundr breaks into a barrow and kills its inhabitant Þráinn and takes the treasure and a sword. It may also have contained Hrómundr being accused of seducing the king's sister Svanhvit, a fight against Hrǫgvið's brother Helgi Haddingjaskati and two kings. Hrómundr is wounded but they win the battle, after which Hrómundr marries the princess.		Þorgils saga ok hafliða, Hrómundar saga Gripssonar	
Hrothgar	Old English: Hrōðgār, Old Norse: Hróarr, Latin: Roas or Roe	Beowulf is generally considered to be based on historic people and events. Hrothgar probably has his origin in a king may have ruled around 500.	AS Hrothgar is derived from *Hrōþi-gaizaz, meaning "fame spear", while ON Hróarr and Roar are derived from a cluster of related names in Proto-Norse: *Hrōþi-gaizaz, meaning "fame spear", *Hrōþi-harjaz, meaning "fame warrior", and *Hrōþi-warjaz meaning "fame protector".	Hrothgar was a Scylding king who was the son of Healfdene. He had the brother Heorogar and through him the nephew Heoroweard, and the brother Halga and through him the nephew Hroðulf. He may also have had an unnamed sister who was married to the Swedish king Onela. He was married to Wealþeow with whom he had the sons Hreðric and Hroðmund and the daughter Freawaru. He is not as prominent in surviving Scandinavian sources as he is in Beowulf.	Beowulf, Widsith	Chronicon Lethrense and Annales Lundenses, Gesta danorum, Hrólfs saga kraka, Skjöldunga saga, Bjarkarímur, Hversu	
Hrothmar	Old Norse: Hróðmarr		The first element Hróð- means "fame" from PN *hrōðiʀ and -marr means "excellent", "commendable".	A king who wanted the most beautiful woman Sigrlinn, the daughter of king Sváfnir of Svávaland. He invaded Svávaland and killed king Sváfnir, but he could not find Sigrlinn who was instead found and married by king Hjörvard. Sigrlinn and Hjörvard would have the son Helgi Hjörvardsson who would avenge his maternal grandfather by killing Hrothmar. Helgi would in turn be killed by Hrothmar's son Alf^{7}, and the lay Helgakvíða Hjörvarðssonar ends with Helgi's brother Hethin preparing to kill Alf^{7} in turn.		Helgakvíða Hjörvarðssonar	
Hugdietrich^{1}	Latin: Hug Theodoricus, Middle High German: Hugdietrîch	Possibly a Merovingian king such as Theuderic I or Clovis.	Hūg-, possibly meaning "high", is a name applied to the Salian Franks: thus Hugdietrich might mean "Frankish Dietrich."	Father of Wolfdietrich, ancestor of Dietrich von Bern. Different versions of Wolfdietrich portray him as being betrayed by his counsellor Sabene, wooing a bride from an unwilling father, or in conflict with Ortnit.			Wolfdietrich, Dietrichs Flucht, Heldenbuch-Prosa
Hugdietrich^{2}	Middle High German: Hugdietrîch			In Wolfdietrich D, the son of Wolfdietrich who is brought up by Heribrand. In Dietrichs Flucht he marries Sigeminne von Frankreich and has a son named Amelung.			Wolfdietrich, Dietrichs Flucht
Huld	Old Norse: Hulð or Huld		The name is from PGmc *χuldōn meaning "hiding, secrecy".	Snorri tells in Ynglinga saga that one winter Vanlandi, the king of Sweden, stayed with Snær ("snow") in Lappland and his daughter Drífa. He married her promising to return for her after three years. However, after ten years he had still not returned. Humiliated Drífa^{1} sent their son Vísburr to Uppsala (where the Swedish king resided) accompanied by a witch named Huld, whom she had paid to transport Vanlandi to Lappland with magic, or kill him. The magic caused Vanlandi to want to go Lappland, but his advisors made him stay. Instead Huld had him hag ridden to death. When Vanlandi's son Vísburr was king, he rejected his first wife and she went to her father with their sons Gísl and Ǫndurr. He married another woman and had the son Dómaldi with her. When his rejected sons were 12 and 13, they came to him to claim their mother's gold necklace, but their father refused. Gísl and Ǫndurr contacted Huld who promised to help them kill their father by casting a curse on him, but warned that doing so she would curse the Yngling dynasty with kinslaying. The two boys did not heed the warning but set their father's hall on fire one night and burnt him to death with his retinue. Huld also had a legendary saga of her own which is mentioned in Sturlunga saga, *Huldar saga, but it only exists in two reconstructed versions (Sagan af Huld drottningu hinni ríku) of which the youngest manuscript is from the 18th c.		Ynglinga saga (13 and 14), Sturlunga saga	
Hulvid	Old Norse: Hulvíðr		The first element Hul- may be Holm- which means "small island", while the last element is -víðr, from PN *wiðu- meaning "trees" or "forest". The names of the three brothers Hulvíðr, Gautvíðr and Fólkvíðr agree with Swedish naming traditions.	According to the Ynglinga saga, Hulvíðr, Gautvíðr and Fólkvíðr were the sons of Svipdag^{4} the Blind, the king of Sweden's representative while away from Uppsala. When Ingjald ill-ruler invited several neighbouring petty kings to a feast at his hall, it was Folkvid and Hulvid who barred the doors of the hall and set it ablaze, as previously ordered by the king. Together with his brother Gautvid, and their father Svipdag, Hulvid fell in battle against Granmar of Södermanland and his ally Hjörvard^{2} Wulfing.		Ynglinga saga	
Humli	Old Norse: Humli, Latin: Hulmul, Latin: Humblus		*Humli is a reconstructed word for "hind". ON humula-, or *humala- meant "hornless" and referred especially to hinds, and Jordanes stressed the importance of the hind (cerva) in Gothic mythology. Consequently, Humli of the Huns may have originated in a Gothic expression that meant "protector (king) of the Huns".	King of the Huns. His daughter Sifka is captured and raped by Heidrek, and then sent back pregnant with Hlöd, whom Humli raises. When Heidrek has been killed by his slaves, Humli tells Hlöd to claim his inheritance from his brother Angantýr^{1}. Hlöd does not accept receiving only a third of the inheritance, and Humli resolves to invade the Gothic lands, but after an epic battle, both he and Hlöd are slain. He is also mentioned in Jordanes' Getica (Hulmul) and as a Danish king in Gesta Danorum.	Getica	Hervarar saga, Gesta Danorum	
Humlung	Old Norse: Humlungr		The name is a doublet of Hymlingr. Humall (humla-) means "hops", but there is also Humli which was the name of legendary Hunnish king and the etymology of his name may be based on Gothic mythology (see above). The suffix -ingr/ungr could mean "descendant" or "person associated with".	In Helgakvíða Hjörvarðssonar, Humlung is one of four sons of Hjörvard^{4}, a king in Norway. With Alfhild^{2} he had son named Hedin, with Særeid a son named Humlung, and with Sinriód a son named Hymling. Helgakviða Hjörvarðssonar deals with how he won his fourth wife, Sigrlinn, the daughter of king Svafnir of Svavaland, and the story of their son Helgi Hjörvarðsson.		Helgakviða Hjörvarðssonar	
Hun	Old Norse: Húnn, Old English: Hūn Latin: Hun		Húnn means "child" or "bear cub", "giant", or "the high one", i.e. "king".	Hun appears at the massive Battle of Brávellir as one of the Danish king Harald Wartooth's warriors in his battle against the Swedish king Sigurd Ring. Hun is the first champion on the Danish side that Starkad attacks and quickly kills. Hun's friend Ella wants to avenge his friend and takes on the giant warrior, only to be killed as well. Gesta Danorum only mentions him in a list of warriors sequentially killed by Starkad before he cuts off the hand of the shield-maiden Visna. He may be the same as the sea-king Húnn who appears in Skáldskaparmál, and as Hūn, the king of the Hætwere in Widsith.	Widsith	Skáldskaparmál, Sögubrot, Gesta Danorum (VIII)	
Hunding	Old Norse: Hundingr		The name means "descendant of a dog" in Old Norse.	Hunding was a powerful king who was killed by Sigmund's son Helgi, who thus earned himself the cognomen Hundingsbane, and Helgakviða Hundingsbana I adds that Helgi was only 15 years old. The lay tells that he refused to give his sons compensation, and so they attacked him but were defeated and killed. The Völsunga saga names them Alf^{2} and Eyjolf, Hervard^{2} and Hagbard^{2}, but Helgakviða Hundingsbana I and II call them Alf^{2} and Eyjolf, Hjorvard^{3} and Havarth. Helgakviða Hundingsbana II adds a son named Heming, and the Völsunga saga adds yet another son called king Lyngvi who killed Sigmund in battle. Helgakviða Hundingsbana II adds the backstory that Hunding was the king of Hundland, and that Helgi had been sent to be raised by a man named Hagal. As Hunding was at war with Sigmund, Helgi went to Hunding's hall to spy but met Heming, one of Hunding's sons, and called himself Hamal (the name of Hagal's son). Suspicious Hunding sent men, led by a man named Blind, to Hagal to search for Helgi but he escaped dressed as a female servant. Helgi went to a warship and after that he killed Hunding. The second lay adds that when Helgi met Hunding at Valhalla, he humiliated him by having him do menial chores. Finch identifies him with a Norwegian king from Flateyjarbók, and a son of a Saxon king Syrik in Gesta Danorum.		Helgakviða Hundingsbana I, Helgakviða Hundingsbana II, Völsunga saga, Skáldskaparmál, Norna-Gests þáttr	
Hundingus	Latin: Hundingus	Probably based on the tradition of the Swedish king Fjölnir.	See Hunding, above.	In Gesta Danorum (I), Hundingus, the king of Sweden, erroneously believes his friend Hadingus to have been killed in a plot and holds a memorial feast for him. However, he falls into a huge vat of beer and drowns. When Hadingus learns of this he returns the honour by sacrificing himself publicly by hanging. Hundingus death is similar to that of the Swedish king Fjölnir, and the tradition of Fjölnir has probably been transposed to different characters.		Gesta Danorum (I)	
Hungar	Old English: Hungar		Malone translated the name as "dog spear", while Chambers connects it to the Gothic name Hunigais. According to Förstemann, the first element hun, in Hunegais, may have several meanings, such as "bear cub" and "hunnish" and he considers "dog" to be a possibility, and as to the second element it means "spear".	Appears in Widsith, line 117. Malone identifies him with Lamissio, in Historia Langobardorum by Paul the Deacon, and with Lyngvi from the legends of Helgi Hundingsbane, while Chambers connects him to Onegesius, Attila's viceroy.	Widsith		
Hunlaf	Old English: Hūnlāf, Latin: Hunleifus, Latin: Hunlapi		The first element hūn- means "high", and the second element is *-laibaz which means "descendant" or "heir".	Hunlaf appears in the Finnsburg Fragment and in Beowulf, as one of Hengest's men. In Beowulf an unnamed son of his offers Hengest a famous sword to incite him to vengeance. Hunlaf may have been the brother of Guthlaf and Oslaf, and the three appear in a list of six or seven sons of a Danish king Leifus in the Skjöldunga saga. Hunlaf was a well-known hero in Anglo-Saxon legends, as is shown by the mentioning of him among the other Germanic heroes Wudga, Hama, Hrothulf, Hengest and Horsa, in the manuscript MS Cotton Vesp D. IV. (fol 139 b).	Finnsburg Fragment, Beowulf	Skjöldunga saga	
Hunolt	Middle High German: Hûnolt			The chamberlain (kamerære) of the Burgundians.			Nibelungenlied, Biterolf und Dietleib
Husto	Old Norse: Hústó, Latin: Hubba and Ubbi		Hús- means "house", and -tó means a "tuft of grass" or "tow of wool". The unusual name may be a corruption of Hubba, which is the same as Ubbi, a hypocoristic form of Úlfr ("wolf"), or possibly a form of úfr, earlier ūb- ("unpleasant").	In Ragnarssona þáttr, Husto and Yngvar are the sons of Ragnar Lodbrok by a concubine. When their half-brother Ivar the Boneless had conquered England, he had them torture Edmund the Martyr. The names Yngvar and Ivar may have been variant forms of the same name and so Yngvar may have originated in Ivar the Boneless himself. In Abbo of Fleury's Life of St. Edmund, it is reported that Edmund was killed by Yngware (probably Ivar) and Hubba, and Hubba is the same name as Ubbi, who appears as a bastard son of Ragnar Lodbrok in Gesta Danorum.	Life of St. Edmund	Ragnarssona þáttr, Gesta Danorum (IX)	
Hvit	Old Norse: Hvít		The name means "white" in ON.	A Saami princess who marries the Norwegian king Hring. After the king's son Björn refuses her advances, she curses him to become a bear at night. His son Bodvar Bjarki eventually kills her in revenge.		Hrolfs saga kraka	
Hvitserk^{1}	Old Norse: Hvítserkr, Latin: Witserchus		Hvítr means "white", and serkr means "shirt".	He is the brother of Svipdag^{2} and Beigaðr. In the Bjarkarímur, he is the oldest of the three sons of the Swedish farmer Svip, and he goes to Uppsala and kills the first two warriors who try to stop him. The next day, he has to fight king Aðils' (Eadgils) berserkers, and kills five of them before the king dismisses the rest. The berserkers come back with an army to have revenge and Hvitserk is sent out with a small company to fight them and would have lost unless his father had sent his brothers to help him. He loses an eye and leaves Sweden for Hrólfr Kraki, when he understands that it had been a ruse by the king. In Hrólfs saga kraka, his role is given to the youngest brother, Svipdag^{2}. In the Skjöldunga saga, Hvitserk is a Swedish warrior who was compared to Starkad in fame, and he had excelled Starkad by fighting twelve giants at the same time, and killing six of them on his own. Hrólfr kraki gave his daughter Driva to him in marriage, while he gave his daughter Skur as wife to Bödvar Bjarki. Hvitserk is also mentioned as one of Hrólf kraki's champions in the Prose Edda and in Hrólfs saga kraka. In the Prose Edda, he is sent with his brothers Svipdag and Beiguðr by Hrólfr kraki to fight for Aðils in the Battle on the Ice of Lake Vänern, and in Hrólfs saga kraka, he and his brothers take part in Hrólfs expedition to Uppsala, and in his final battle.		Skjöldunga saga, Prose Edda, Hrólfs saga kraka, Bjarkarímur	
Hvitserk^{2} the Swift	Old Norse: Hvítserkr, Latin: Witserc, Withsercus	No historical prototype.	See Hvitserk^{1}	In Ragnars saga loðbrókar, the third son of Ragnar Lodbrok and Aslaug^{1} after Ivar the Boneless and Björn Ironside and before Rognvald, and Sigurd Snake-in-the-Eye. He goes with his brothers to attack Hvítabœr and its dangerous bulls that were strengthened through sacrifices, and he takes part in his brothers' expedition to Sweden to avenge their half-brothers Agnar^{4} and Eric^{3}, where there is an even more dangerous cow, Sibilja. He also takes part in the invasion of England to avenge their father Ragnar. He ends his life in Eastern Europe, where he is taken captive and is on his own request burnt alive on a pyre of severred heads. In Ragnarssona Þáttr and Ad catalogum, the same family relations are mentioned, but the only further naming of him in expeditions are in the first source, where he takes part in the expedition to Sweden, and in the Battle of Leuven (891). In Ragnars saga loðbrókar, he is said to have a kingdom, and in Ragnarssona Þáttr this is specified as Jutland and Wendland. In Gesta Danorum (IX), he is the son of Ragnar with Svanlaug and the brother of Regnald and Eric. He becomes the king of Scythia, and is taken captive by king Daxon of Ruthenia, who grants his request to burn him alive on a pyre, and this in spite of Daxon being impressed with his physical beauty and offering him his daughter. This happens before the death of his father Ragnar, and Ragnar avenges him, by banishing Daxon to Útgarðar, although he later lets him return and accepts tribute.		Ragnars saga loðbrókar, Ad catalogum regum Sveciæ annotanda, Ragnarssona Þáttr, Gesta Danorum (IX)	
Hwala	Old English: Hwala	Appears to be unhistorical.	The meaning of the name is unknown.	Appears in Widsith, line 14, and he is also mentioned in the West Saxon genealogy as the grandson of Sheaf.	Widsith, West Saxon genealogy		
Hygd	Old English: Hygd	Hygelac was probably married, but the character in Beowulf is found only there and probably not "genuinely historical".	From OE gehygd ("thought, mind").	Wife of the Geatish king Hygelac. She is young and inexperienced but she handles her role as queen well and she is courteous to the retainers at Hygelac's court. Her behaviour is contrasted with that of Modthryth, the queen of king Offa of Angel. When Beowulf returns from the Danes, he gives her the necklace that Wealhtheow had given him and three horses. When Hygelac dies in battle against the Franks, it is Hygd who is the kingmaker, which shows that her authority is unchallenged among the Geats. Instead of giving the throne to her son Heardred, she offers it to Beowulf, who accepts to serve as regent until Heardred is old and mature enough to become king. Her behaviour is in accordance with her name.	Beowulf		
Hygelac	Old English: Hygelāc, Old Norse: Hugleikr, Latin: Hugletus	Historical king of the Geats, died c. 521- c. 523.	PN *Hugilaikaz, from *hugi- ("mind"), and an agent noun of *laikan ("to play", "to jump", "to dance").	In Beowulf, he is king of the Geats and the son of the previous king Hreðel. He has the brothers Hæþcyn and Herebeald, and his sister is the mother of Beowulf, with whom he has a warm relationship. He led an ill-fated raid in the Frankish terrories in the lower Rhine territory. In Liber monstrorum, described as a giant whose bones were shown to visitors on an island in the estuary of the Rhine. By the time, Snorri tells of his death, the Geats appear to have been subsumed by the Swedes, and Hugleikr is described as a Swedish king who was killed by Starkad, but in Gesta Danorum (VI) the same story is told with Huglethus as a king of Ireland (but this story does not appear in Starkad's Death Song). In Gesta Danorum (IV) he also appears as a Danish king who defeats the Swedish chieftains Hømothus (Eymóðr, i.e. Ēanmund) and Øgrim.	Beowulf, Liber monstrorum, Liber Frankorum	Ynglinga saga (22), Gesta Danorum (IV and VI)	
Hymling	Old Norse: Hymlingr		The name is a doublet of Humlungr. See Humlung for etymology.	In Helgakvíða Hjörvarðssonar, Humlung is one of four sons of Hjörvard^{4}, a king in Norway. With Alfhild^{2} he had son named Hedin, with Særeid a son named Humlung, and with Sinriód a son named Hymling. Helgakviða Hjörvarðssonar deals with how he won his fourth wife, Sigrlinn, the daughter of king Svafnir of Svavaland, and the story of their son Helgi Hjörvarðsson.		Helgakviða Hjörvarðssonar	

== Sources ==
- Anderson, Carl Edlund (1999). Formation and Resolution of Ideological Contrast in the Early History of Scandinavia (PDF) (Thesis). University of Cambridge.
- Anderson, Carl Edlund (2016). "Scyld Scyldinga: Intercultural Innovation at the Interface of West and North Germanic". Neophilologus. 100 (3): 461–476. doi:10.1007/s11061-015-9468-y. S2CID 162985589.
- Ayres, Henry Morgan (1917). "The Tragedy of Hengest in "Beowulf"". The Journal of English and Germanic Philology. 16 (2): 282–295. JSTOR 27700808.
- Biggs, Frederick M. (2003). "Hondscioh and Æschere in Beowulf". Neophilologus. 87 (4): 635–652. doi:10.1023/A:1025471415863. S2CID 159641273.
- Byock, Jesse (1990). The Saga of the Volsungs: The Norse Epic of Sigurd the Dragon Slayer. University of California Press. ISBN 0-520-23285-2.
- Byock, Jesse (1998). The Saga of King Hrolf Kraki. Penguin Classics. ISBN 014043593X.
- Stories and Ballads of the Far Past. Translated by Chadwick, Nora Kershaw. Cambridge at the University Press. 1921.
- Chambers, Robert W. (1912). Widsith. Cambridge : The University press.
- Chambers, Robert W. (1921). Beowulf. Cambridge : The University press.
- Clarke, M. G. (1911). Sidelights on Teutonic History During the Migration Period, being Studies of Beowulf and Other Old English Poems. Cambridge University Press.
- Clausen, H. V. (1918). "Kong Hugleik". In Knudsen, Gunnar; Krisensen, Marius (eds.). Danske studier. Gyldendalske boghandel, Nordisk forlag; København.
- Cleasby, Richard; Vigfússon, Gudbrand (1874). An Icelandic-English dictionary. Oxford Clarendon Press.
- Edda, Snorri Sturluson. Translated by Faulkes, Anthony. Everyman. 1995. ISBN 978-0460876162.
- The Saga of the Volsungs (PDF). Translated by Finch, R. G. London and Edinburgh: Nelson. 1965.
- Finlay, Alison (2010). "The Saga of Ásmundr, Killer of Champions: Introduction" (PDF). In Arnold, Martin; Finlay, Alison (eds.). Making History: Essays on the Fornaldarsögur. Viking Society for Northern Research. pp. 119–124. ISBN 978-0-903521-84-0.
- Heimskringla (PDF). Vol. 1. Translated by Finlay, Alison; Faulkes, Anthony. Viking Society for Northern Research, University College London. 2016. ISBN 978-0-903521-86-4.
- Friis-Jensen, Karsten, ed. (2015). Saxo Grammaticus Gesta Danorum, The History of the Danes. Vol. 1. Translated by Fisher, Peter. Oxford University Press. ISBN 978-0-19-82052-34.
- Förstemann, Ernst (1900). Altdeutsches Namenbuch, Band 1: Personennamen (2 ed.). Bonn.
- Garmonsway, G.N.; Simpson, Jacqueline; Ellis Davidson, Hilda (1968). Beowulf and its Analogues. . M. Dent & Sons ltd. ISBN 0-460-03804-4.
- Edda, Snorri Sturluson. Translated by Faulkes, Anthony. Everyman. 1995. ISBN 978-0460876162.
- Fulk, R.D.; Cain, Christopher M. (2013). A History of Old English Literature. Wiley-Blackwell. ISBN 978-1-118-45323-0.
- Gillespie, George T. (1973). Catalogue of Persons Named in German Heroic Literature, 700-1600: Including Named Animals and Objects and Ethnic Names. Oxford: Oxford University. ISBN 978-0-19-815718-2.
- Guðmundsdóttir, Aðalheiður (2016). "Tales of Generations: A comparison between some Icelandic and Geatish narrative motifs". In Mårtensson, Lasse; Óskarsson, Veturlíði (eds.). Scripta Islandica. Uppsala: Uppsala University. ISSN 0582-3234.
- Hedeager, Lotte (2011). Iron Age Myth and Materiality: An Archaeology of Scandinavia AD 400–1000. London and New York: Routledge. ISBN 978-113681725-0.
- Heinzel, Richard (1885). Ueber die Nibelungensage. Vienna: Carl Gerhold's Sohn.
- The Poetic Edda (PDF). Translated by Hollander, Lee M. University of Texas Press. 1928.
- Jesch, Judith (2016). "Hrómundar saga Gripssonar". In Pulsiano, Philip; Wolf, Kirsten (eds.). Medieval Scandinavia, an Encyclopedia. New York: Routledge Revivals. p. 305. ISBN 978-1-315-16132-7.
- Jiriczek, Otto Luitpold (1898). Deutsche Heldensagen, Band 1. Strasbourg: Karl Trübner. ISBN 9783112176429.
- De Gamle Eddadigte. Translated by Jónsson, Finnur. G. E. C. Gats forlag, København. 1932.
- Kaufmann, Hennig (1968). Ergänzungsband zu Ernst Förstemann: Personennamen. Wilhelm Fink.
- Kightley, Michael R. (2016). "The Brothers of Beowulf : Fraternal Tensions and the Reticent Style". ELH. 83 (2): 407–429. doi:10.1353/elh.2016.0015. S2CID 164186249.
- Klaeber, Friedrich (2008). Fulk, R.D.; Bjork, Robert E.; Niles, John D. (eds.). Klaeber's Beowulf and The Fight at Finnsburg. University of Toronto Press. pp. 274–277. ISBN 978-0-8020-9843-6.
- Krause, Arnulf (2010). Reclams Lexikon der germanischen Mythologie und Heldensage. Reclam. ISBN 978-3-15-010778-2.
- Lienert, Elisabeth (2015). Mittelhochdeutsche Heldenepik. Berlin: Erich Schmidt. ISBN 978-3-503-15573-6.
- Lincoln, Bruce (2014). Between History and Myth, Stories of Harald Fairhair and the Founding of the State. Chicago and London: The University of Chicago Press. ISBN 978-0-226-14092-6.
- Malone, Kemp (1941). "Hygd". Modern Language Notes. 56 (5): 356–358. doi:10.2307/2911214. JSTOR 2911214.
- Malone, Kemp (1962). Widsith. Rosenkilde and Bagger, Copenhagen.
- McKinnell, John (2005). Meeting the Other in Norse Myth and Legend. Cambridge: DS Brewer. ISBN 1-84384-042-1.
- McTurk, Rory (1991). Studies in Ragnars saga Loðbrókar and its Major Scandinavian Analogues. The Society for the Study of Mediæval Languages and Literature, Oxford. ISBN 0-907570-08-9.
- McTurk, Rory W. (2006). "Kings and Kingship in Viking Northumbria" (PDF). In McKinnell, John S.; Ashurst, David; Kick, Donata (eds.). The Fantastic in Old Norse Icelandic Literature, Preprint Papers of the 13th International Saga Conference, Durham and York 6th-12th August 2006. Vol. 2. pp. 681–688.
- Miller, Clarence H. (2007). "Fragments of Danish History". ANQ: A Quarterly Journal of Short Articles, Notes and Reviews. 20 (3): 9–33. doi:10.3200/ANQQ.20.3.9-22. S2CID 161363696.
- Millet, Victor (2008). Germanische Heldendichtung im Mittelalter. Berlin, New York: de Gruyter. ISBN 978-3-11-020102-4.
- Mitchell, Stephen A. (1991). Heroic Sagas and Ballads. Ithaca and London: Cornell University Press. ISBN 978-1-5017-0744-5.
- Nerman, Birger (1925). Svenska rikets uppkomst. Stockholm: Generalstabens litografiska anstalt.
- Newton, Sam (1993). The Origins of Beowulf and the Pre-Viking Kingdom of East Anglia. Cambridge University Press. ISBN 9780859914727.
- Olrik, Axel (1919). The Heroic Legends of Denmark. Translated by Hollander, Lee M. New York: The American-Scandinavian Foundation.
- Olson, Oscar Ludvig (1916). "The Relation of the Hrólfs saga kraka and the Bjarkarímur to Beowulf". Publications of the Society for the Advancement of Scandinavian Study. 3 (1): 1–104. JSTOR 40914974.
- Orchard, Andy (1997). Dictionary of Norse Myth and Legend. Cassel. ISBN 0-304-34520-2.
- Orel, Vladimir E. (2003). A Handbook of Germanic Etymology. Brill. ISBN 978-90-04-12875-0.
- Pakis, Valentine Anthony (2008). "The Meaning of Æschere's Name in Beowulf". Anglia. 126 (1): 104–113. doi:10.1515/angl.2008.006.
- Hrolf Gautreksson. Translated by Pálsson, Hermann; Edwards, Paul. Edinburg: Southside. 1972. ISBN 0-8020-1814-9.
- Peterson, Lena (2004). Lexikon över urnordiska personnamn. Uppsala: Institutet för språk och folkminnen.
- Peterson, Lena (2007). Nordiskt runnamnslexikon. Uppsala: Institutet för språk och folkminnen.
- Pritsak, Omeljan (1981). The origin of Rus'. Harvard University Press. pp. 188–225.
- Schütte, Gudmund (1912). "The Geats of Beowulf". The Journal of English and Germanic Philology. 11 (4): 574–602. JSTOR 27700194.
- Simek, Rudolf (1993). Dictionary of Northern Mythology. Translated by Hall; Angela. D. S. Brewer. ISBN 0-85991-369-4.
- The Saga of King Heidrek the Wise (PDF). Translated by Tolkien, Christopher. 1960.
- Uecker, Heiko (1972). Germanische Heldensage. Stuttgart: Metzler. ISBN 3476101061.
- de Vries, Jan (1970). Altgermanische Religionsgeschichte, Bd.2, Die Götter, Vorstellungen über den Kosmos, Der Untergang des Heidentums. de Gruyter, Berlin. ISBN 978-3110028072.
- de Vries, Jan (1962). Altnordisches Etymologisches Worterbuch (2000 ed.). Brill. ISBN 90-04-05436-7.
- The Sagas of Ragnar Lodbrok. Translated by Waggoner, Ben. New Haven: Troth Publications. 2009.
- Weise, Judith (1986). "The Meaning of the Name 'Hygd': Onomastic Contrast in Beowulf". Names. 34 (1): 1–10. doi:10.1179/nam.1986.34.1.1.
- Wessén, Elias (1927). "Eddadikterna om Helge Hundingsbane". Fornvännen.
- Wessén, Elias (1952). Wessén, Elias; Helgason, Jón; Knudsen, Trygve; Skautrup, Peter (eds.). Ynglingsaga. Svenska bokförlaget Norstedts, Stockholm; Ejnar Munksgaard, København; Dreyers forlag, Oslo.
- Westrin, Th. (1908). "Gautvid". In Westrin, Th. (ed.). Nordisk Familjebok. Vol. 9 (2 ed.). p. 802.
