= Hrímnir =

Norse mythical character

Hrímnir (Old Norse: [ˈhriːmnez̠]) is a jǫtunn in Norse mythology. He is the father of Hljód.

== Name ==
The Old Norse name Hrímnir has been translated as 'frosty', 'the one covered with hoarfrost', or 'the sooty one.' Probably intended to evoke the frost giants or hrímþursar (jǫtunn).

== Attestations ==
In the Völsunga saga, Hrímnir is mentioned as the father of Hljóð, who is sent by Frigg as a "wish-maid" to Rerir with the apple of fertility that will provide his wife offspring. Hrímnir himself sends his daughter Hljóð to be the wife of one of the children, Völsung.

Hrímnir is listed among the jǫtnar in the þulur section of the Prose Edda.

In Hyndluljóð (32), Hrímnir is the father of Heiðr and Hrossþjófr, but that may be just for the purpose of alliteration. He is also mentioned in Skírnismál (28), probably as a typical jötunn.

In Gríms saga loðinkinna, Hrímnir is the father of the giantesses Feima and Kleima; his wife's name is Hyrja.

== Theories ==
Scholars have argued that the story of Hrímnir in the Völsunga saga resembles that of Peredur in the Matter of Britain, and the modern folktale "The Sea-Maiden."
