= Völsung =

Figure in Germanic mythology

Völsung (Old Norse: Vǫlsungr [ˈvɔlsuŋɡr̩], Old English: Wæls) is a figure in Germanic mythology, where he is the eponymous ancestor of the Völsung family (Old Norse: Vǫlsungar, Old English: Wælsings), which includes the hero Sigurð. In Nordic mythology, he is the son of Rerir and was murdered by the Geatish king Siggeir. He was later avenged by one of his sons, Sigmund, and his daughter Signy, who was married to Siggeir.

Völsung's story is recorded in the Völsung Cycle, a series of legends about the clan. The earliest extant versions of the cycle were recorded in medieval Iceland; the tales of the cycle were expanded with local Scandinavian folklore, including that of Helgi Hundingsbane (which appears to originally have been part of the separate tradition of the Ylfings), and form the material of the epic poems in the Elder Edda and of Völsunga saga, which preserves material from lost poems. Völsung is also the subject matter of the Middle High German epic poem Nibelungenlied and is referred to in the Old English epic Beowulf.

== Name ==
The Old English Wælsing is composed of a suffix denoting a family (-ing), and the name of the family's ancestor, Wæls. Old Norse: Vǫlsungr similarly has the cognate suffix -ung, leading to the suggestion of an older Old Norse name for Völsung as Völsi, a cognate of Wæls. The name Völsi appears elsewhere in Völsa þáttr, a short story from Óláfs saga helga describing a horse phallus, that had been preserved with linen and leeks, referred to as "Völsi" being used in a heathen religious context. Following from this, it has been suggested that the original name of Völsung and his family evoked the fertility of a stallion.

== Attestations ==
=== Völsunga saga ===
According to Völsunga saga, Völsung was the son of King Rerir of Hunaland, in turn, a grandson of Odin. The king and the queen were struggling to have a child and so prayed to the gods for help. In response, Frigg gave an apple of fertility to Hljóð, the daughter of the jötunn Hrímnir, who travelled to the queen using her krákuhamr ("crow-shape"). Völsung's father the king died shortly after this, but the queen became pregnant for six years, until her health began to fail. She commanded that the child be delivered by caesarean section.

Völsung was born a well-grown child and was able to kiss his mother before she died. He was immediately proclaimed king of Hunaland, and when he had grown up he married Hljóð. Together they had ten sons and one daughter, including the twins Signy, their daughter, and Sigmund, the most courageous and beautiful of their sons.

Völsung built himself a great hall in the centre of which stood a large tree called the Barnstokkr. Siggeir, the King of the Geats, soon arrived and proposed to Signy. Both Völsung and his sons approved, but Signy was less enthusiastic. A great wedding was held in the hall, when suddenly a stranger appeared. He was a tall old man with only one eye and could not be anyone but Odin. He went to the tree, took his sword and stuck it deep into the trunk. Odin told everyone that the sword was meant for the man who could pull the sword from the tree. Then he vanished.

Everyone at the wedding tried to pull the sword but only Sigmund succeeded, and he did so effortlessly. Siggeir, his brother-in-law, offered thrice its weight in gold for the sword, but Sigmund scornfully said no. This greatly angered Siggeir, and he swore that one day the sword would be his and that he would avenge his humiliation upon the Völsung family. He returned home the next day, ending the wedding feast early. Before he left he invited the Völsungs to conclude the feast with him when the winter had passed.

Three months later Völsung and his sons sailed to Siggeir's land. They were met by Signy, who warned them that Siggeir intended to ambush them. They refused to turn back, whereupon Signy cried and implored them to go home. Soon they were attacked by Siggeir's army. Völsung fell and his ten sons were taken captive. His son Sigmund escapes and later avenges him by burning King Siggeir in his hall.

=== Beowulf ===
Völsung (Old English: Wæls) and his family are referred to in Beowulf when a thegn is singing of how Sigemund slew a worm:

wélhwylc gecwæð
þæt hé fram Sigemunde secgan hyrde
ellendaédum: uncúþes fela
Wælsinges gewin wíde síðas
þára þe gumena bearn gearwe ne wiston
faéhðe ond fyrena búton Fitela mid hine
...
hæfde áglaéca elne gegongen
þæt hé béahhordes brúcan móste
selfes dóme saébát gehléod
bær on bearm scipes beorhte frætwa
Wælses eafera.

— Old English text
Translation:

He recounted all
he had heard tell concerning Sigemund's
works of prowess, many a strange tale,
the arduous deeds of the Wælsing and his adventures far and wide,
deeds of vengeance and of enmity, things that the children of men knew not full,
save only Fitela who was with him,
...
The fierce slayer had achieved by his valour
that he might at his own will enjoy that hoard of rings;
the boat upon the sea he landed
and bore to the bosom of his ship the bright treasures,
the offspring of Wæls was he.

— Tolkien translation

== Modern influence ==
=== Retellings ===
The story of Völsung and his children, from the marriage of Signy to Siggeir to Sigmund's vengeance on Siggeir, is retold in the novelette "Vengeance" by Arthur Gilchrist Brodeur, which appeared in the magazine Adventure, June 30, 1925. Brodeur was a professor at Berkeley and became well known for his scholarship on Beowulf and sagas.

As Völsungakviđa en Nýja (The New Lay of the Völsungs) J. R. R. Tolkien retells the story in the Old Norse verse style of the Poetic Edda. It was published posthumously together with a poetic retelling of the Niflung saga under the title, The Legend of Sigurd and Gudrún.

=== Wagner ===
The Völsung tale was also the inspiration for much of Richard Wagner's second and third operas of the Ring cycle. Siegmund and his twin sister Sieglinde reconnect and fall in love in Die Walküre (The Valkyrie) and Siegmund pulls the sword from the tree. Their son Siegfried goes on to become a hero in the following opera, Siegfried.

== Toponomy ==
Place names derived from names of Völsung or his family:

England:

- Walsingham ("Homestead of the Wælsings"), parish in Norfolk comprising Little and Great Walsingham

== See also ==
- Völsung Cycle
- Tyrfing Cycle
