= Hunaland =

Mythic European kingdom

Hunaland and its people are mentioned several times in the Poetic Edda, in the legendary sagas, and in chivalric sagas.

Its origins are partly the old Frankish kingdom (the Franks were once called Hugones, in Latin, and Hūgas in Old English) and partly in the Huns.

The Frankish hero Sigurd is called the Hunnish king in epic poetry.

Also the Hervarar saga and the Vilkina saga mention Hunaland, its kings and its hosts.

In Old Norse sources, Hunaland often has a mythological character and can shift between different parts of Europe, depending on what kind of skills the hero is to show. It is separated from other countries by the forest Myrkviðr, but one source may locate it up in the north at Bjarmaland, another source says that it borders on Reidgotaland, a third source places it in parts of Germany and other sources place it on either side of the Gulf of Bothnia down to Gästrikland, in Sweden.

== See also ==
- Norsemen
- Frankish Empire
