= Hljod =

Norse mythical character

Hljod or Ljod (Old Norse: Hljóð [ˈhljoːð]) is a jötunn in Norse mythology. She is the spouse of Völsung, the daughter of the jötunn Hrímnir, and the mother of Sigmund and Signy.

== Name ==
The Old Norse name Hljóð has been translated as "howl".

== Attestation ==
In the first chapter of Völsunga saga, Hljóð is portrayed as the daughter of the jötunn Hrímnir, and as a 'wish-maiden' of the god Odin, which could be interpreted as 'Valkyrie of Odin'.

Völsunga saga: Þat er nú sagt, at Frigg heyrir bæn þeira ok segir Óðni, hvers þau biðja. Hann verðr eigi örþrifráða ok tekr óskmey sína, dóttur Hrímnis jötuns.	It is now said that Frigg heard their prayers and told Óðinn what they prayed. He was not without resources and took his wish-maid, the daughter of the jötunn Hrímnir.

Hljóð then assumes the shape of a crow and provides the apple of fertility to the childless Rerir, who eventually begets Hljóð's own husband Völsung.

Völsunga saga: Nú þá er hann var alroskinn at aldri, þá sendir Hrímnir honum Hljóð, dóttur sína, er fyrr er getit, þá er hún fór með eplit til Reris, föður Völsungs.	Now when he was fully come to man's estate, Hrimnir the giant sends to him Ljod his daughter; she of whom the tale told, that she brought the apple to Rerir, Volsung's father.
