= Rerir =

Norse mythological hero

In Völsunga saga, Rerir, the son of Sigi, succeeds his murdered father and avenges his death. He rules in Hunaland and becomes a powerful ruler. Rerir's son is Völsung.

Rerir and his wife were unable to have children until the goddess Frigg, the wife of Odin sent them a giantess named Hljod in the shape of a crow to deliver an apple of fertility to the couple. Shortly after, Rerir’s wife becomes pregnant. However Rerir dies from an illness after the conception. His wife remained pregnant for six years, until she realized that she was dying and commanded that the child be delivered by Caesarian section, an operation that in those days cost the life of the mother. When the child called Völsung was delivered, he was already well grown and he “kissed his mother before she died.”

Mount Rerir is a location in the fictional world of Middle-earth.
