= List of valkyrie names =

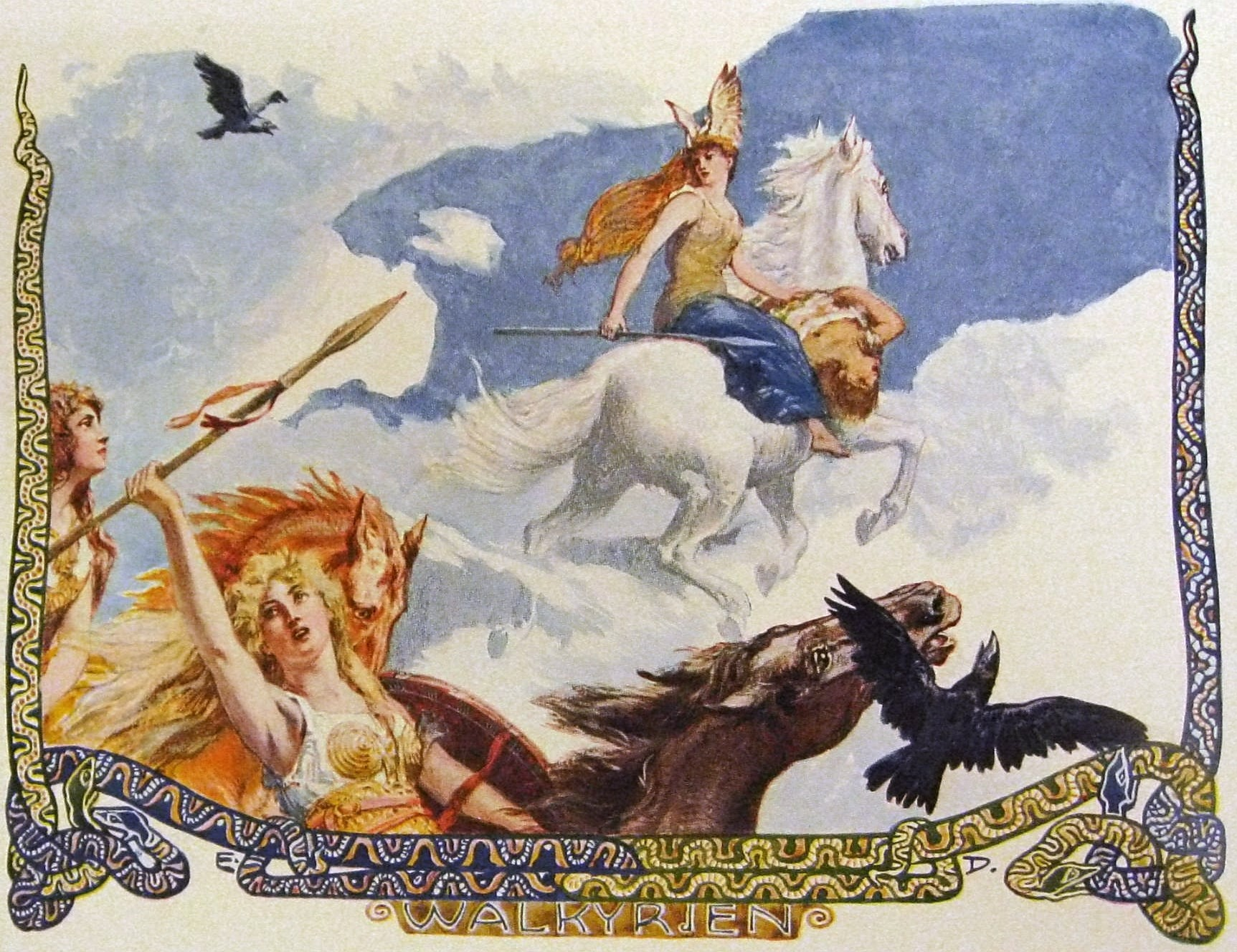
"Walkyrien" by Emil Doepler (1905)

In Norse mythology, a valkyrie (from Old Norse valkyrja "chooser of the fallen") is one of a host of female figures who decide who will die in battle. Selecting among half of those who die in battle (the other half go to the goddess Freyja's afterlife field Fólkvangr), the valkyries bring their chosen to the afterlife hall of the slain, Valhalla, ruled over by the god Odin. There, when the einherjar are not preparing for the events of Ragnarök, the valkyries bear them mead. Valkyries also appear as lovers of heroes and other mortals, where they are sometimes described as the daughters of royalty, sometimes accompanied by ravens, and sometimes connected to swans.

The Old Norse poems Völuspá, Grímnismál, Darraðarljóð, and the Nafnaþulur section of the Prose Edda book Skáldskaparmál provide lists of valkyrie names. Other valkyrie names appear solely outside these lists, such as Sigrún (who is attested in the poems Helgakviða Hundingsbana I and Helgakviða Hundingsbana II). Valkyrie names commonly emphasize associations with battle and, in many cases, with the spear—a weapon heavily associated with the god Odin. Scholars such as Hilda Ellis Davidson and Rudolf Simek propose that the names of the valkyries themselves contain no individuality, but are rather descriptive of the traits and nature of war-goddesses, and are possibly the descriptive creations of skalds, a type of traditional Scandinavian poet.

Some valkyrie names may be descriptive of the roles and abilities of the valkyries. The valkyrie name Herja may point to an etymological connection to Hariasa, a Germanic goddess attested on a stone from 187 CE. The name Herfjötur has been theorized as pointing to the ability of the valkyries to place fetters, which would connect the valkyries to the earlier Idisi. The name Svipul may be descriptive of the influence the valkyries have over wyrd or ørlog—a Germanic concept of fate.

== Valkyrie Names ==
=== Saga Age ===
Name	Name meaning	Referred to as a valkyrie in
Alruna	"Secret"	Völundarkviða
Brunhilde	"Battle armor" or "bright armor"	Skáldskaparmál, Der Ring des Nibelungen (as Brünnhilde)
Eir	"Peace", "clemency", "help" or "mercy"	Nafnaþulur
Galdrar	"Incantation"	Skirnismál
Geir	"Spear"	Nafnaþulur
Geirajödr	"Killer spear"	Appears in some manuscripts of Grímnismál in place of the valkyrie name Geirölul
Geiravör	"Wisdom spear"	Nafnaþulur
Geirdriful	"Shooter spear"	Nafnaþulur
Geirölul	"The one charging forth with the spear"	Grímnismál, Nafnaþulur
Geirskögul	"Shaker spear"	Hákonarmál, Völuspá, Nafnaþulur
Göll	"Tumult" or "rumble"	Grímnismál, Nafnaþulur
Göndul	"Magic wand"	Völuspá, Nafnaþulur
Gunnr	"War" or "clash"	Völuspá, Darraðarljóð, Gylfaginning, Nafnaþulur
Herfjötur	"Host fetter" or "structure of the army"	Grímnismál, Nafnaþulur
Herja	"Devastation"	Nafnaþulur
Hervör Alvitr	"All wise" or "strange creature"	Völundarkviða
Hildr	"Combat"	Völuspá, Grímnismál, Darraðarljóð, Nafnaþulur
Hjalmthrimul	"Helmet clatterer" or "frenzy warrior"	Nafnaþulur
Hjörthrimul	"Sword noisy"	Darraðarljóð, Nafnaþulur
Hladgudr Svanhvit	"Swan white"	Völundarkviða
Hljod	"Howl"	Völsunga saga
Hlökk	"Unstable"	Grímnismál, Nafnaþulur
Hrist	"The quaking one"	Grímnismál, Nafnaþulur
Hrund	"Pricker"	Nafnaþulur
Kára	"The wild", "stormy one" or "the curly one"	Helgakviða Hundingsbana II
Mist	"Cloud" or "mist"	Grímnismál, Nafnaþulur
Ölrún	"Kept mystery"	Völundarkviða
Radgridr	"Council truce" or "the bossy"	Grímnismál, Nafnaþulur
Randgriz	"Shield truce" or "shield destroyer"	Grímnismál, Nafnaþulur
Reginleif	"Power trace" or "daughter of the gods"	Grímnismál, Nafnaþulur
Róta	"Sleet and storm"	Gylfaginning
Sanngridr	"Very violent" or "very cruel"	Darraðarljóð
Sigrdrífa	"Victory path" or "inciter of victory"	Sigrdrífumál
Sigrún	"Victory brand"	Helgakviða Hundingsbana I, Helgakviða Hundingsbana II
Skalmöld	"Sword time"	Nafnaþulur
Skeggjöld	"Axe era"	Grímnismál, Nafnaþulur
Skögul	"Shaker" or "high towering"	Hákonarmál, Völuspá, Grímnismál, Nafnaþulur
Skuld	"Future"	Völuspá, Gylfaginning, Nafnaþulur
Sváfa	"Creatoress of dreams"	Helgakviða Hjörvarðssonar
Sveidr	"Vibration" or "sound"	Nafnaþulur
Svipul	"Changeable"	Darraðarljóð, Nafnaþulur
Thögn	"Silence"	Nafnaþulur
Thrima	"Fight"	Nafnaþulur
Thrud	"Power" or "empowerment"	Grímnismál, Nafnaþulur

=== Modern Period ===
Name	Name meaning	Referred to as a valkyrie in
Gerhilde	"War spear"	Der Ring des Nibelungen
Grimgerde	"Severe protection"	Der Ring des Nibelungen
Helmwige	"Warrior helmet"	Der Ring des Nibelungen
Ortlinde	"Gentle advice"	Der Ring des Nibelungen
Rossweisse	"White rose"	Der Ring des Nibelungen
Schwertleite	"Sword experience"	Der Ring des Nibelungen
Siegrune	"Victory connoisseur"	Der Ring des Nibelungen
Waltraute	"Force of the death"	Der Ring des Nibelungen

== See also ==
- List of Amazons

== General and cited references ==
- Davidson, Hilda Roderick Ellis (1988). Myths and Symbols in Pagan Europe: Early Scandinavian and Celtic Religions. Manchester University Press. ISBN 0719025796
- Lindow, John (2001). Norse Mythology: A Guide to the Gods, Heroes, Rituals, and Beliefs. Oxford University Press. ISBN 0-19-515382-0
- Haymes, Edward (2010). Wagners Ring in 1848: New Translations of The Nibelung Myth and Siegfried's Death. Camden House.
- Orchard, Andy (1997). Dictionary of Norse Myth and Legend. Cassell. ISBN 0 304 34520 2
- Simek, Rudolf (2007) translated by Angela Hall. Dictionary of Northern Mythology. D.S. Brewer ISBN 0859915131
- Cleasby, Richard; Vigfússon, Guðbrandur (1878). An Icelandic-English Dictionary. Clarendon Press.
