= Gunnr =

Valkyrie in Norse mythology

Gunnr (alternatively Guðr) is one of the named Valkyries in Norse mythology, specifically referenced in the Völuspá (st. 30/7; NK, p. 7), Helgakviða Hundingsbana II (st. 7/4; NK, p. 152), and the Prose Edda. Her name is an Old Norse term that translates to "battle". The Valkyries Gunnr, Rota, and the young norn Skuld were said to decide the outcome of battles, and, at its conclusion, would ride out to take the slain.

Gunnr was also a feminine given name among Norsemen. The modern forms Gun and Gunn remain in use as a feminine given name in Scandinavia. The word is from Proto-Germanic *gunþiz, a common element of Northern and Western Germanic names. It is often used as the second element in feminine names (as in Hildegund), and as the first element in masculine names (as in Gunther).

The earliest attestation of the name is on the Rök Stone where it occurs as part of a kenning for wolf:

Þat sagum tvalfta, hvar hæstʀ se Gunnaʀ etu vettvangi a, kunungaʀ tvaiʀ tigiʀ svað a liggia.
"I say this the twelfth, where the horse of Gunnr sees fodder on the battlefield, where twenty kings lie."

== Valkyrie ==
Gunnr is mentioned in the Völuspá in a list of valkyries, Gunnr, Hildr, Göndul / ok Geirskögul. The Darraðarljóð gives Guðr as one of six names of valkyries.

In the Prose Edda Gunnr is singled out along with Róta and Skuld as one of the valkyries who always ride out to decide battles and take the slain. Another mention of Gunnr specifically states that those named are "Odin's Valkyries":

Guðr ok Róta ok norn in yngsta, er Skuld heitir, ríða jafnan at kjósa val ok ráða vígum.
"Gunnr and Róta and the youngest Norn, she who is called Skuld, ride ever to take the slain and decide fights."
Ek man nefna valkyrjur Viðris: Hrist, Mist, Herja, Hlǫkk, Geiravǫr, Gǫll, Hjǫrþrimul, Guðr, Herfjǫtur, Skuld, Geirǫnul, Skǫgul ok Randgnið.
"I can name Viðrir's <= Óðinn's> valkyries: Hrist, Mist, Herja, Hlǫkk, Geiravǫr, Gǫll, Hjǫrþrimul, Gunnr, Herfjǫtur, Skuld, Geirǫnul, Skǫgul and Randgnið."
{Herskerðir} klauf {harðan stofn svarðar} {kunnum eldviðum} með sverði sunnr; hann gekk reiðr of skeiðar. Gramr kunni sarka {rô {holdbarkar}} at gunni; {margr heggr {Gunnþinga}} lá of hǫggvinn jarnmunnum.
"{The army-diminisher} [RULER] split {the hard stump of the scalp} [HEAD] {of famous sword-trees} [WARRIORS] with a sword in the south; he went angry through the warships. The prince knew how to redden {the yard-arm {of flesh-bark}} [MAIL-SHIRT > SWORD] in battle; {many a cherry-tree {of meetings of Gunnr <valkyrie>}} [BATTLES > WARRIOR] lay chopped down by iron mouths."
