= Darraðarljóð =

Old Norse poem

Darraðarljóð is a skaldic poem in Old Norse found in chapter 157 of Njáls saga. It consists of 11 stanzas recounting the vision of a man named Dǫrruðr, in which twelve valkyries weave and choose who is to be slain at the Battle of Clontarf (fought outside Dublin in 1014). Their loom uses human entrails as warp and woof, swords as treadles, an arrow as the batten and men's heads as weights. Of the twelve valkyries weaving, six of their names are given: Hildr, Hjǫþrimul, Sanngriðr, Svipul, Guðr, and Gǫndul. Stanza 9 of the song has been translated:

Now awful it is to be without,
as blood-red rack races overhead;
is the welkin gory with warriors' blood
as we valkyries war-songs chanted.

The poem may have influenced the concept of the Three Witches in Shakespeare's Macbeth.

Dǫrruðr's vision is located in Caithness and the story is a "powerful mixture of Celtic and Old Norse imagery".

== In popular culture ==
"The Fatal Sisters: An Ode" (published 1768) by Thomas Gray is a paraphrase of Darraðarljóð.

Einar Selvik and Trevor Morris used stanzas from Darraðarljóð in the opening battle in season 2 of Vikings.

Darraðarljóð was set to music in a 1964 composition for mixed chorus and orchestra by the Icelandic composer Jón Leifs (Op. 60). The work was premiered on the 6th of March 2025 in Harpa concert hall in Reykjavik by the Iceland Symphony Orchestra and the combined forces of two choirs, Kór Langholtskirkju and Kór Hallgrímskirkju, conducted by Eva Ollikainen, as part of a concert celebrating the orchestra's 75th anniversary.
