= Hlökk =

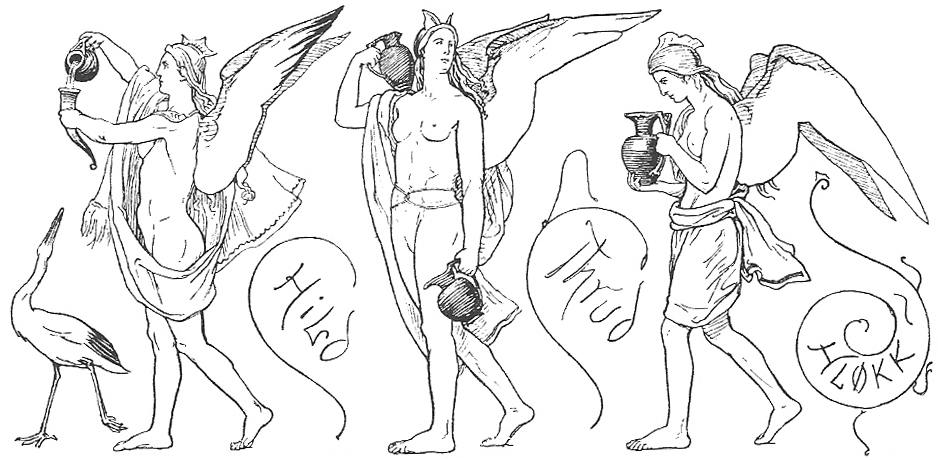
The valkyries Hildr, Þrúðr and Hlökk bearing ale in Valhalla (1895) by Lorenz Frølich.

In Norse mythology, Hlökk or Hlǫkk (Old Norse "noise, battle") is a valkyrie. Hlökk is attested as among the 13 valkyries listed in the Poetic Edda poem Grímnismál, and additionally in both Nafnaþulur lists found in the Prose Edda.
