= Valkyrie =

Figures in Norse mythology

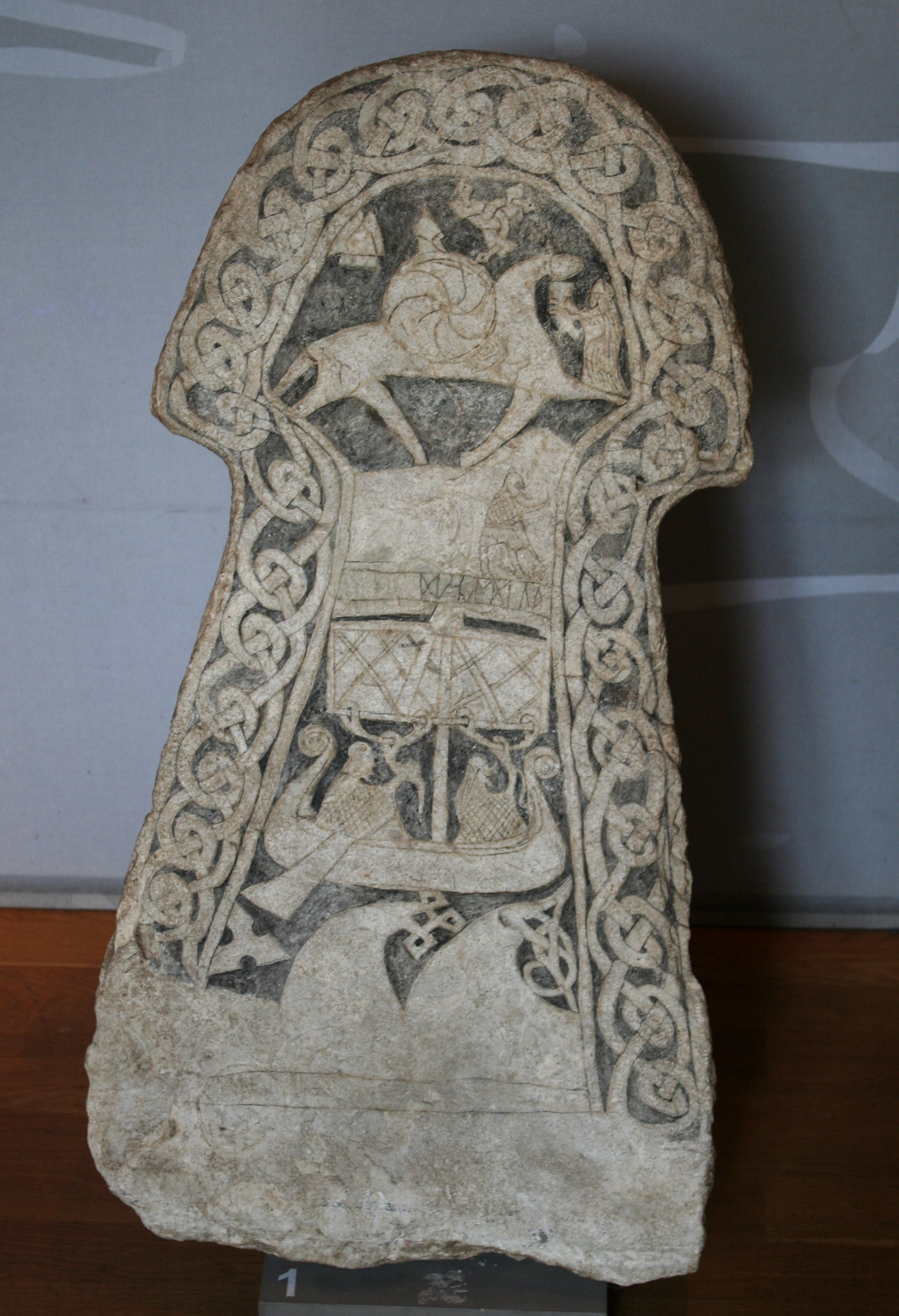
The picture stone Lilbjärs III, showing a helmeted woman receiving a man with a horn of mead. On picture stones, the recurring motif of a woman receiving a man with a horn is generally interpreted as a dead man being received by a valkyrie at Valhalla.

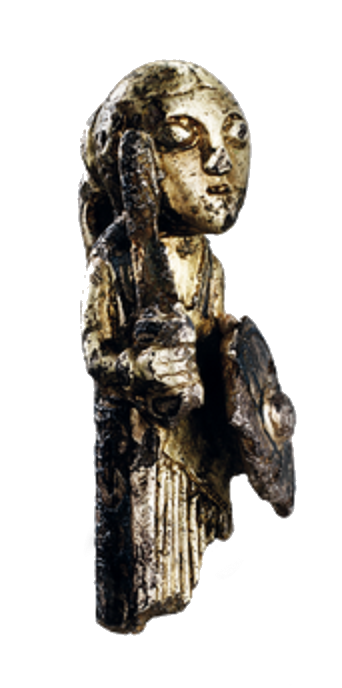
The "valkyrie from Hårby", silver-gilt figurine depicting a female figure with a sword and shield, often interpreted to be a valkyrie.

In Norse mythology, a valkyrie (/ˈvælkɪri/ VAL-kirr-ee or /vælˈkɪəri/ val-KEER-ee; from Old Norse: valkyrja, lit. 'chooser of the slain') is one of a host of female figures who guide souls of the dead to the god Odin's hall Valhalla. There, the deceased warriors become einherjar ('single fighters' or 'once fighters'). When the einherjar are not preparing for the cataclysmic events of Ragnarök, the valkyries bear them mead. Valkyries also appear as lovers of heroes and other mortals, where they are sometimes described as the daughters of royalty, sometimes accompanied by ravens and sometimes connected to swans, boars or wolves.

Valkyries are attested in the Poetic Edda (a book of poems compiled in the 13th century from earlier traditional sources), the Prose Edda, the Heimskringla (both by Snorri Sturluson) and the Njáls saga (one of the Sagas of Icelanders), all written—or compiled—in the 13th century. They appear throughout the poetry of skalds, in a 14th-century charm, and in various runic inscriptions.

The Old English cognate term wælcyrge appears in several Old English manuscripts, and scholars have explored whether the term appears in Old English by way of Norse influence, or reflects a tradition also native among the Anglo-Saxon pagans. Scholarly theories have been proposed about the relation between the valkyries, the Norns, and the dísir, all of which are supernatural figures associated with fate. Archaeological excavations throughout Scandinavia have uncovered amulets theorized as depicting valkyries. In modern culture, valkyries have been the subject of works of art, musical works, comic books, video games and poetry.

== Etymology ==
The word valkyrie derives from Old Norse valkyrja (plural valkyrjur), which is composed of two words: the noun valr (referring to the slain on the battlefield) and the verb kjósa (meaning 'to choose'). Together, they mean 'chooser of the slain'. The Old Norse valkyrja is cognate to Old English wælcyrge. From the Old English and Old Norse forms, philologist Vladimir Orel reconstructs the Proto-Germanic form *walakuzjǭ. However, the term may have been borrowed into Old English from Old Norse: see discussion in the Old English attestations section below.

Other terms for valkyries in Old Norse sources include óskmey ('wish maid'), appearing in the poem Oddrúnargrátr, and Óðins meyjar ('Odin's maids'), appearing in the Nafnaþulur. Óskmey may be related to the Odinic name Óski (roughly meaning 'wish fulfiller'), referring to the fact that Odin receives slain warriors in Valhalla.

The name Randalín, which Aslaug is called in Ragnars saga loðbrókar, when she joins her sons to avenge their brothers Agnarr and Eric in Sweden, is probably from Randa-Hlín, which means 'shield-goddess', i.e. a kenning for 'Valkyrie'.

== Old Norse attestations ==
=== Poetic Edda ===
Valkyries are mentioned or appear in the Poetic Edda poems Völuspá, Grímnismál, Völundarkviða, Helgakviða Hjörvarðssonar, Helgakviða Hundingsbana I, Helgakviða Hundingsbana II and Sigrdrífumál.

==== Völuspá and Grímnismál ====
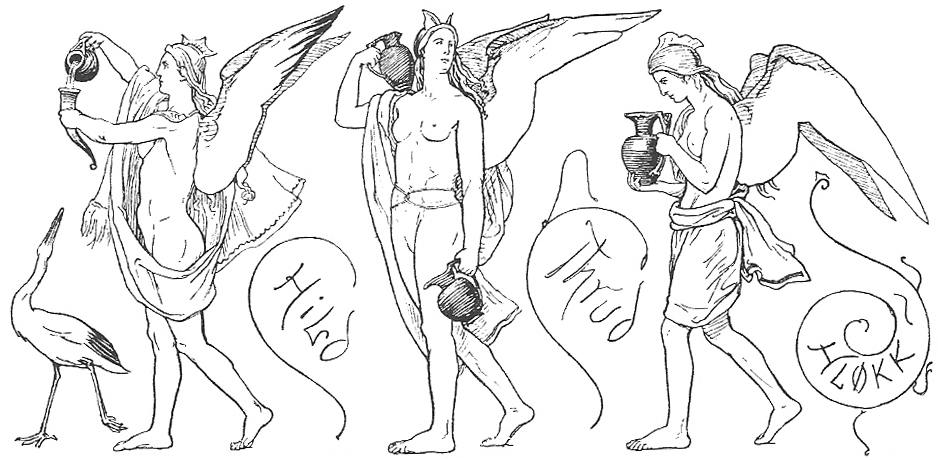
The valkyries Hildr, Þrúðr and Hlökk bearing ale in Valhalla (1895) by Lorenz Frølich

In stanza 30 of the poem Völuspá, a völva (a travelling seeress in Norse society) tells Odin that "she saw" valkyries coming from far away who are ready to ride to "the realm of the gods". The völva follows this with a list of six valkyries: Skuld (Old Norse, possibly "debt" or "future") who "bore a shield", Skögul ("shaker"), Gunnr ("war"), Hildr ("battle"), Göndul ("wand-wielder") and Geirskögul ("Spear-Skögul"). Afterwards, the völva tells him she has listed the "ladies of the War Lord, ready to ride, valkyries, over the earth".

In the poem Grímnismál, Odin (disguised as Grímnir), tortured, starved and thirsty, tells the young Agnar that he wishes that the valkyries Hrist ("shaker") and Mist ("cloud") would "bear him a [drinking] horn", then provides a list of 11 more valkyries who he says "bear ale to the einherjar"; Skeggjöld ("axe-age"), Skögul, Hildr, Þrúðr ("power"), Hlökk ("noise", or "battle"), Herfjötur ("host-fetter"), Göll ("tumult"), Geirahöð ("spear-fight"), Randgríð ("shield-truce"), Ráðgríð ("council-truce") and Reginleif ("power-truce").

While most detailed written sources about Valkyries were compiled in the 13th century after Christianization, they drew upon older oral traditions and skaldic poetry from the pre-Christian era.

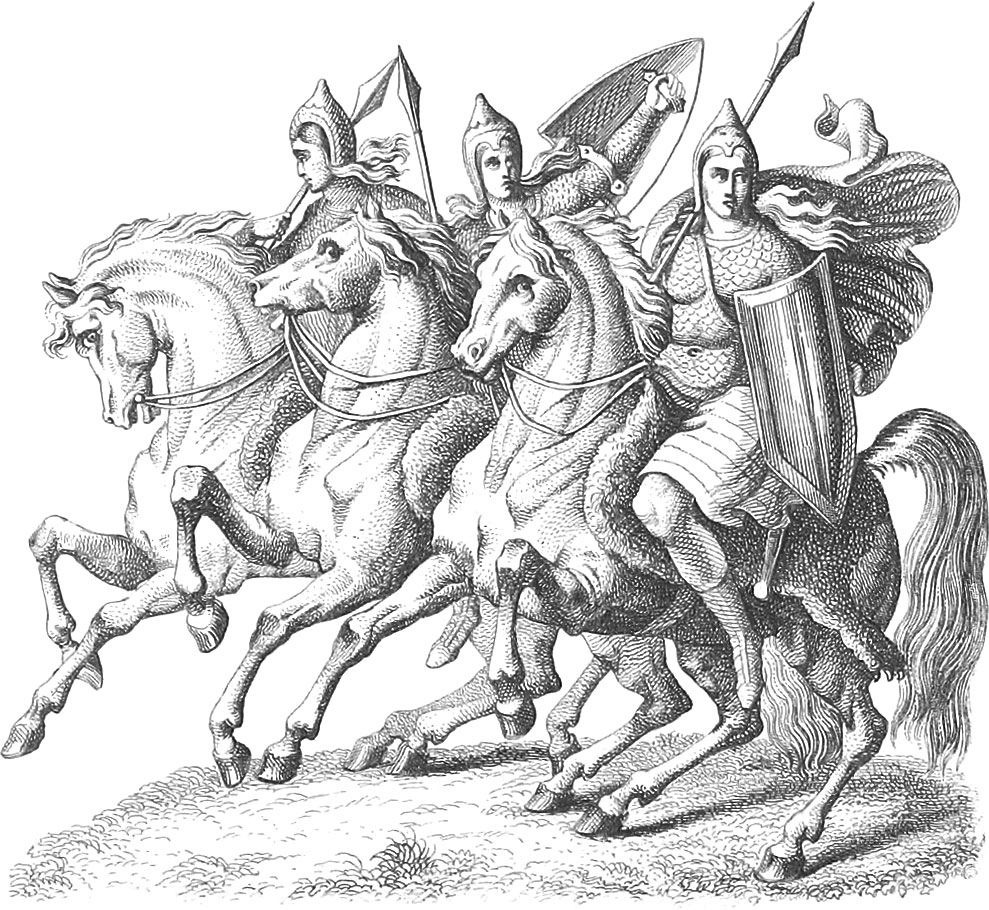
The Valkyræ, by Johann Georg Heck

==== Völundarkviða ====
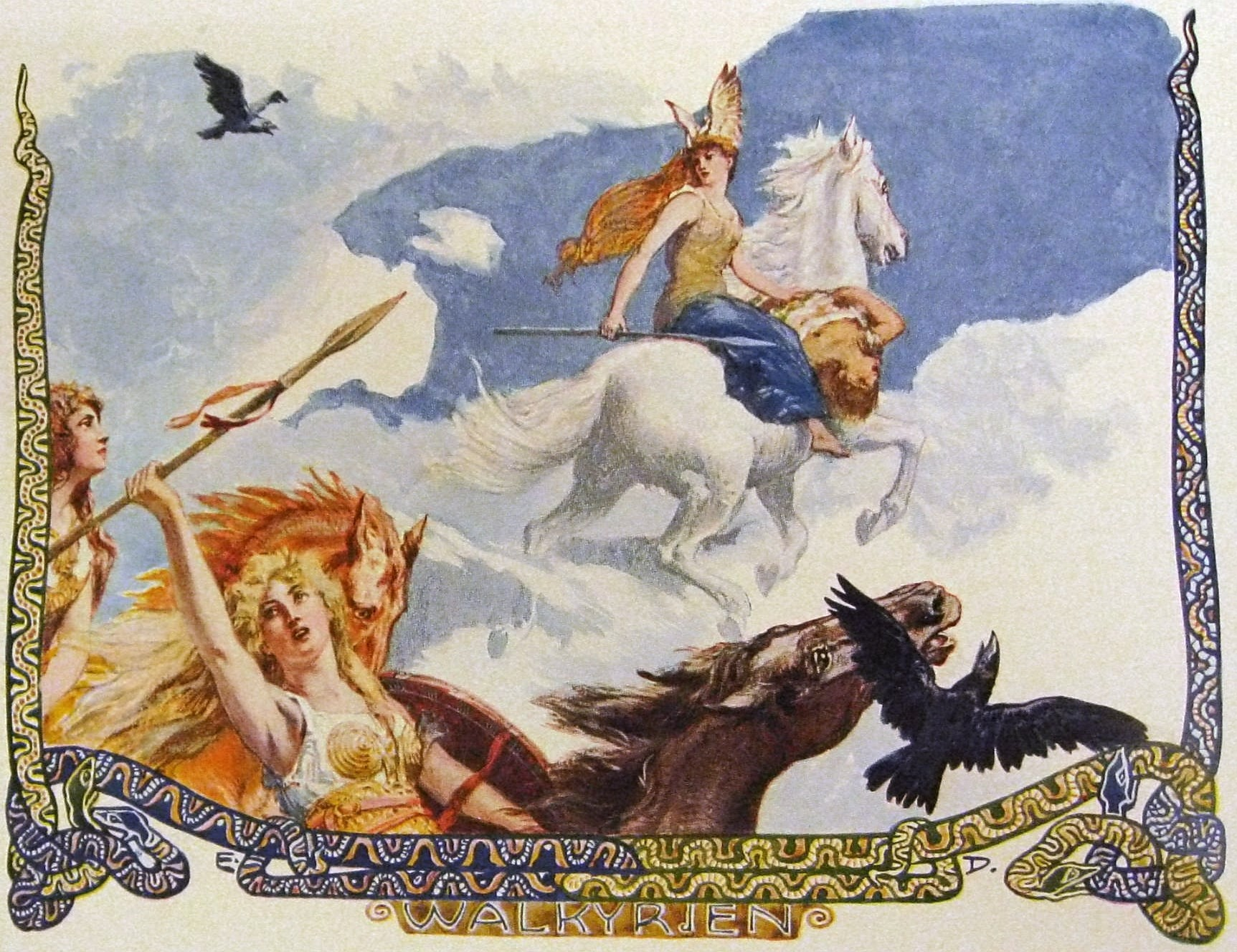
Walkyrien (c. 1905) by Emil Doepler

A prose introduction in the poem Völundarkviða relates that the brothers Slagfiðr, Egil and Völund dwelt in a house sited in a location called Úlfdalir ("wolf dales"). There, early one morning, the brothers find three women spinning linen on the shore of the lake Úlfsjár ("wolf lake"), and "near them were their swan's garments; they were valkyries". Two daughters of King Hlödvér are named Hlaðguðr svanhvít ("swan-white") and Hervör alvitr (possibly meaning "all-wise" or "strange creature"); the third, daughter of Kjárr of Valland, is named Ölrún (possibly meaning "beer rune"). The brothers take the three women back to their hall with them—Egil takes Ölrún, Slagfiðr takes Hlaðguðr svanhvít and Völund takes Hervör alvitr. They live together for seven winters, until the women fly off to go to a battle and do not return. Egil goes off in snow-shoes to look for Ölrún, Slagfiðr goes searching for Hlaðguðr svanhvít and Völund sits in Úlfdalir.

==== Helgakviða Hjörvarðssonar ====
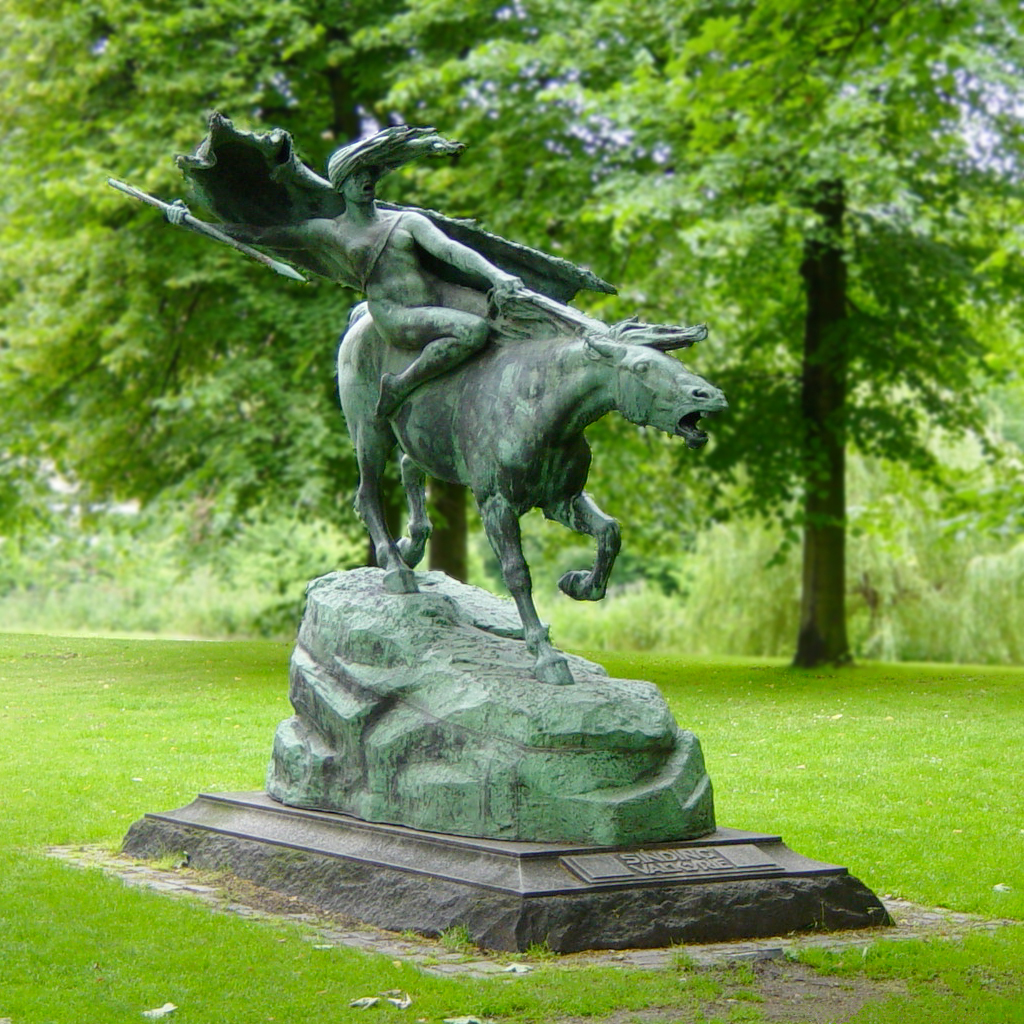
Valkyrie (1908) by Stephan Sinding located in Churchill Park at Kastellet in Copenhagen, Denmark

In the poem Helgakviða Hjörvarðssonar, a prose narrative says that an unnamed and silent young man, the son of the Norwegian King Hjörvarðr and Sigrlinn of Sváfaland, witnesses nine valkyries riding by while sitting atop a burial mound. He finds one particularly striking; this valkyrie is detailed later in a prose narrative as Sváva, King Eylimi's daughter, who "often protected him in battles". The valkyrie speaks to the unnamed man, and gives him the name Helgi (meaning "the holy one"). The previously silent Helgi speaks; he refers to the valkyrie as "bright-face lady", and asks her what gift he will receive with the name she has bestowed upon him, but he will not accept it if he cannot have her as well. The valkyrie tells him she knows of a hoard of swords in Sigarsholm, and that one of them is of particular importance, which she describes in detail. Further into the poem, Atli flytes with the female jötunn Hrímgerðr. While flyting with Atli, Hrímgerðr says that she had seen 27 valkyries around Helgi, yet one particularly fair valkyrie led the band:

Three times nine girls, but one girl rode ahead,
white-skinned under her helmet;
the horses were trembling, from their manes
dew fell into the deep valleys,
hail in the high woods;
good fortune comes to men from there;
all that I saw was hateful to me.

After Hrímgerðr is turned to stone by the daylight, a prose narrative continues that Helgi, who is now king, goes to Sváva's father—King Eylimi—and asks for his daughter. Helgi and Sváva are betrothed and love one another dearly. Sváva stays at home with King Eylimi, and Helgi goes raiding, and to this the narrative adds that Sváva "was a valkyrie just as before". The poem continues, and, among various other events, Helgi dies from a wound received in battle. A narrative at the end of the poem says that Helgi and his valkyrie wife Sváva "are said to be reincarnated".

==== Helgakviða Hundingsbana I ====
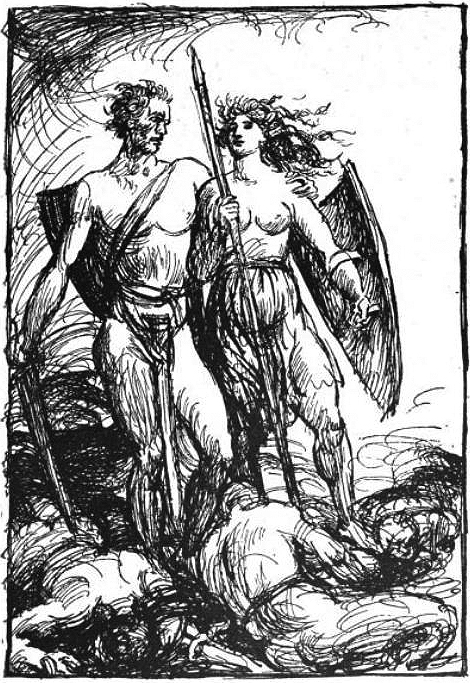
Helgi Hundingsbane and Sigrún (1919) by Robert Engels

In the poem Helgakviða Hundingsbana I, the hero Helgi Hundingsbane sits in the corpse-strewn battlefield of Logafjöll. A light shines from the fell, and from that light strike bolts of lightning. Flying through the sky, helmeted valkyries appear. Their waist-length mail armour is drenched in blood; their spears shine brightly:

Then light shone from Logafell,
and from that radiance there came bolts of lightning;
wearing helmets at Himingvani [came the valkyries].
Their byrnies were drenched in blood;
and rays shone from their spears.

In the stanza that follows, Helgi asks the valkyries (who he refers to as "southern goddesses") if they would like to come home with the warriors when night falls (all the while arrows were flying). The battle over, the valkyrie Sigrún ("victory-rune"), informs him from her horse that her father Högni has betrothed her to Höðbroddr, the son of king Granmar of the Hniflung clan, who Sigrún deems unworthy. Helgi assembles an immense host to ride to wage battle at Frekastein against the Hniflung clan to assist Sigrún in her plight to avoid her betrothment. Later in the poem, the hero Sinfjötli flytes with Guðmundr. Sinfjötli accuses Guðmundr of having once been female, and gibes that Guðmundr was "a witch, horrible, unnatural, among Odin's valkyries", adding that all of the einherjar "had to fight, headstrong woman, on your account". Further in the poem, the phrase "the valkyrie's airy sea" is used for "mist".

Towards the end of the poem, valkyries again descend from the sky, this time to protect Helgi amid the battle at Frekastein. After the battle, all the valkyries fly away but Sigrún and wolves (referred to as "the troll-woman's mount") consume corpses:

Helmeted valkyries came down from the sky
—the noise of spears grew loud—they protected the prince;
then said Sigrun—the wound-giving valkyries flew,
the troll-woman's mount was feasting on the fodder of ravens:

The battle won, Sigrún tells Helgi that he will become a great ruler and pledges herself to him.

==== Helgakviða Hundingsbana II ====
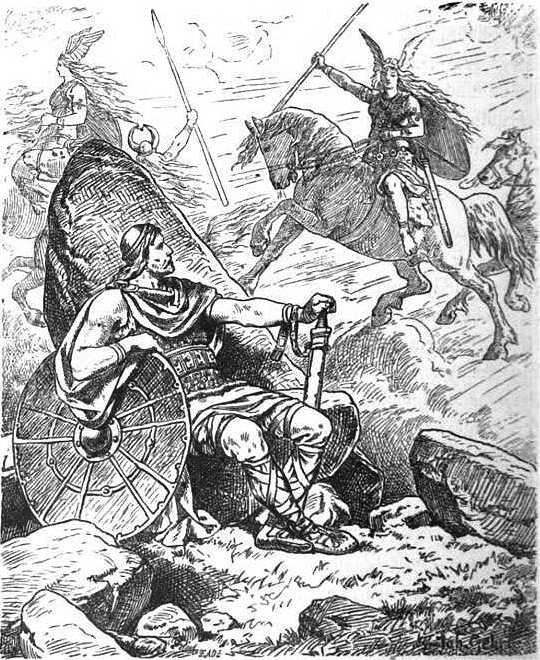
Helgi und Sigrun (1901) by Johannes Gehrts

At the beginning of the poem Helgakviða Hundingsbana II, a prose narrative says that King Sigmund (son of Völsung) and his wife Borghild (of Brálund) have a son named Helgi, who they named for Helgi Hjörvarðsson (the protagonist of the earlier Helgakviða Hjörvarðssonar). After Helgi has killed King Hunding in stanza 4, a prose narrative says that Helgi escapes, consumes the raw meat of cattle he has slaughtered on a beach, and encounters Sigrún. Sigrún, daughter of King Högni, is "a valkyrie and rode through air and sea", and she is the valkyrie Sváva reincarnated. In stanza 7, Sigrún uses the phrase "fed the gosling of Gunn's sisters". Gunnr and her sisters are valkyries, and these goslings are ravens, who feed on the corpses left on the battlefield by warriors.

After stanza 18, a prose narrative relates that Helgi and his immense fleet of ships are heading to Frekastein, but encounter a great storm. Lightning strikes one of the ships. The fleet sees nine valkyries flying through the air, among whom they recognise Sigrún. The storm abates, and the fleets arrive safely at land. Helgi dies in battle, yet returns to visit Sigrún from Valhalla once in a burial mound, and at the end of the poem, a prose epilogue explains that Sigrún later dies of grief. The epilogue details that "there was a belief in the pagan religion, which we now reckon [is] an old wives' tale, that people could be reincarnated" and that "Helgi and Sigrun were thought to have been reborn" as another Helgi and valkyrie couple; Helgi as Helgi Haddingjaskaði and Sigrún as the daughter of Halfdan; the valkyrie Kára. The epilogue details that further information about the two can be found in the (now lost) work Káruljóð.

==== Sigrdrífumál ====
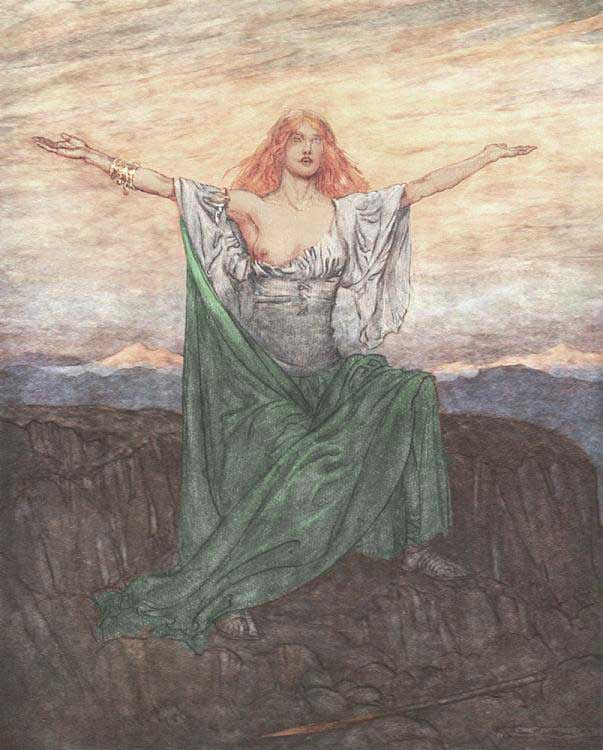
Brünnhilde wakes and greets the day and Siegfried, illustration of the scene of Wagner's Ring inspired by the Sigrdrífumál, by Arthur Rackham (1911).

In the prose introduction to the poem Sigrdrífumál, the hero Sigurd rides up to Hindarfell and heads south towards "the land of the Franks". On the mountain Sigurd sees a great light, "as if fire were burning, which blazed up to the sky". Sigurd approaches it, and there he sees a skjaldborg with a banner flying overhead. Sigurd enters the skjaldborg, and sees a warrior lying there—asleep and fully armed. Sigurd removes the helmet of the warrior, and sees the face of a woman. The woman's corslet is so tight that it seems to have grown into the woman's body. Sigurd uses his sword Gram to cut the corslet, starting from the neck of the corslet downwards, he continues cutting down her sleeves, and takes the corslet off of her.

The woman wakes, sits up, looks at Sigurd, and the two converse in two stanzas of verse. In the second stanza, the woman explains that Odin placed a sleeping spell on her she could not break, and due to that spell she has been asleep a long time. Sigurd asks for her name, and the woman gives Sigurd a horn of mead to help him retain her words in his memory. The woman recites a heathen prayer in two stanzas. A prose narrative explains that the woman is named Sigrdrífa and that she is a valkyrie.

A narrative relates that Sigrdrífa explains to Sigurd that there were two kings fighting one another. Odin had promised one of these—Hjalmgunnar—victory in battle, yet she had "brought down" Hjalmgunnar in battle. Odin pricked her with a sleeping-thorn in consequence, told her she would never again "fight victoriously in battle", and condemned her to marriage. In response, Sigrdrífa told Odin she had sworn a great oath that she would never wed a man who knew fear. Sigurd asks Sigrdrífa to share with him her wisdom of all worlds. The poem continues in verse, where Sigrdrífa provides Sigurd with knowledge in inscribing runes, mystic wisdom, and prophecy.

=== Prose Edda ===
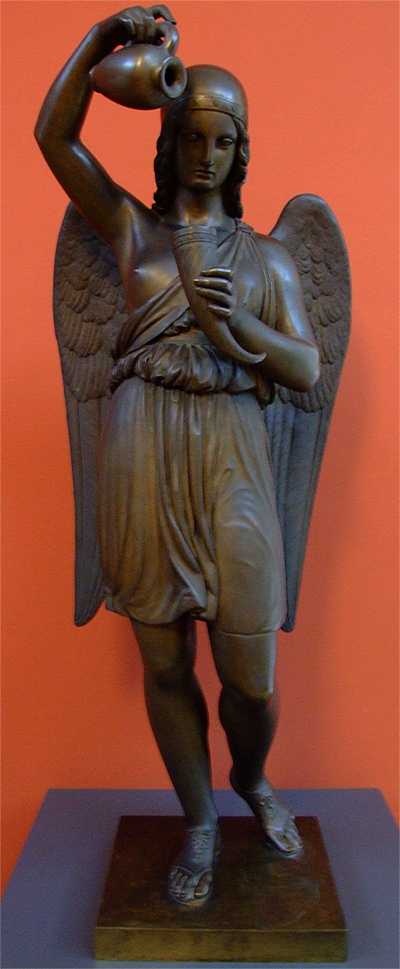
Valkyrie (1835) by Herman Wilhelm Bissen

In the Prose Edda, written in the 13th century by Snorri Sturluson, valkyries are first mentioned in chapter 36 of the book Gylfaginning, where the enthroned figure of High informs Gangleri (King Gylfi in disguise) of the activities of the valkyries and mentions a few goddesses. High says "there are still others whose duty it is to serve in Valhalla. They bring drink and see to the table and the ale cups." Following this, High gives a stanza from the poem Grímnismál that contains a list of valkyries. High says "these women are called valkyries, and they are sent by Odin to every battle, where they choose which men are to die and they determine who has victory". High adds that Gunnr ("war"), Róta, and Skuld—the last of the three he refers to as "the youngest norn"—"always ride to choose the slain and decide the outcome of battle". In chapter 49, High describes that when Odin and his wife Frigg arrived at the funeral of their slain son Baldr, with them came the valkyries and also Odin's ravens.

References to valkyries appear throughout the book Skáldskaparmál, which provides information about skaldic poetry. In chapter 2, a quote is given from the work Húsdrápa by the 10th century skald Úlfr Uggason. In the poem, Úlfr describes mythological scenes depicted in a newly built hall, including valkyries and ravens accompanying Odin at Baldr's funeral feast:

There I perceive valkyries and ravens,
accompanying the wise victory-tree [Odin]
to the drink of the holy offering [Baldr's funeral feast]
Within have appeared these motifs.

Further in chapter 2, a quote from the anonymous 10th century poem Eiríksmál is provided (see the Fagrskinna section below for more detail about the poem and another translation):

What sort of dream is that, Odin?
I dreamed I rose up before dawn
to clear up Val-hall for slain people.
I aroused the Einheriar,
bade them get up to strew the benches,
clean the beer-cups,
the valkyries to serve wine
for the arrival of a prince.

In chapter 31, poetic terms for referring to a woman are given, including "[a] woman is also referred to in terms of all Asyniur or valkyries or norns or dísir". In chapter 41, while the hero Sigurd is riding his horse Grani, he encounters a building on a mountain. Within this building Sigurd finds a sleeping woman wearing a helmet and a coat of mail. Sigurd cuts the mail from her, and she awakes. She tells him her name is Hildr, and "she is known as Brynhildr, and was a valkyrie".

In chapter 48, poetic terms for "battle" include "weather of weapons or shields, or of Odin or valkyrie or war-kings or their clash or noise", followed by examples of compositions by various skalds that have used the name of valkyries in said manner (Þorbjörn Hornklofi uses "Skögul's din" for "battlefield", Bersi Skáldtorfuson uses "Gunnr's fire" for "sword" and "Hlökk's snow" for "battle", Einarr Skúlason uses "Hildr's sail" for "shield" and "Göndul's crushing wind" for "battle" and Einarr skálaglamm uses "Göndul's din"). Chapter 49 gives similar information when referring to weapons and armor (though the term "death-maidens"—Old Norse valmeyjar—instead of "valkyries" is used here), with further examples. In chapter 57, within a list of names of ásynjur (and after alternate names for the goddess Freyja are provided), a further section contains a list of "Odin's maids"; valkyries: Hildr, Göndul, Hlökk, Mist, Skögul. And then an additional four names; Hrund, Eir, Hrist and Skuld. The section adds that "they are called norns who shape necessity".

Some manuscripts of the feature Nafnaþulur section of Skáldskaparmál contain an extended list of 29 valkyrie names (listed as the "valkyries of Viðrir"—a name of Odin). The first stanza lists: Hrist, Mist, Herja, Hlökk, Geiravör, Göll, Hjörþrimul, Guðr, Herfjötra, Skuld, Geirönul, Skögul and Randgníð. The second stanza lists: Ráðgríðr, Göndul, Svipul, Geirskögul, Hildr, Skeggöld, Hrund, Geirdriful, Randgríðr, Þrúðr, Reginleif, Sveið, Þögn, Hjalmþrimul, Þrima and Skalmöld.

=== Hrafnsmál ===
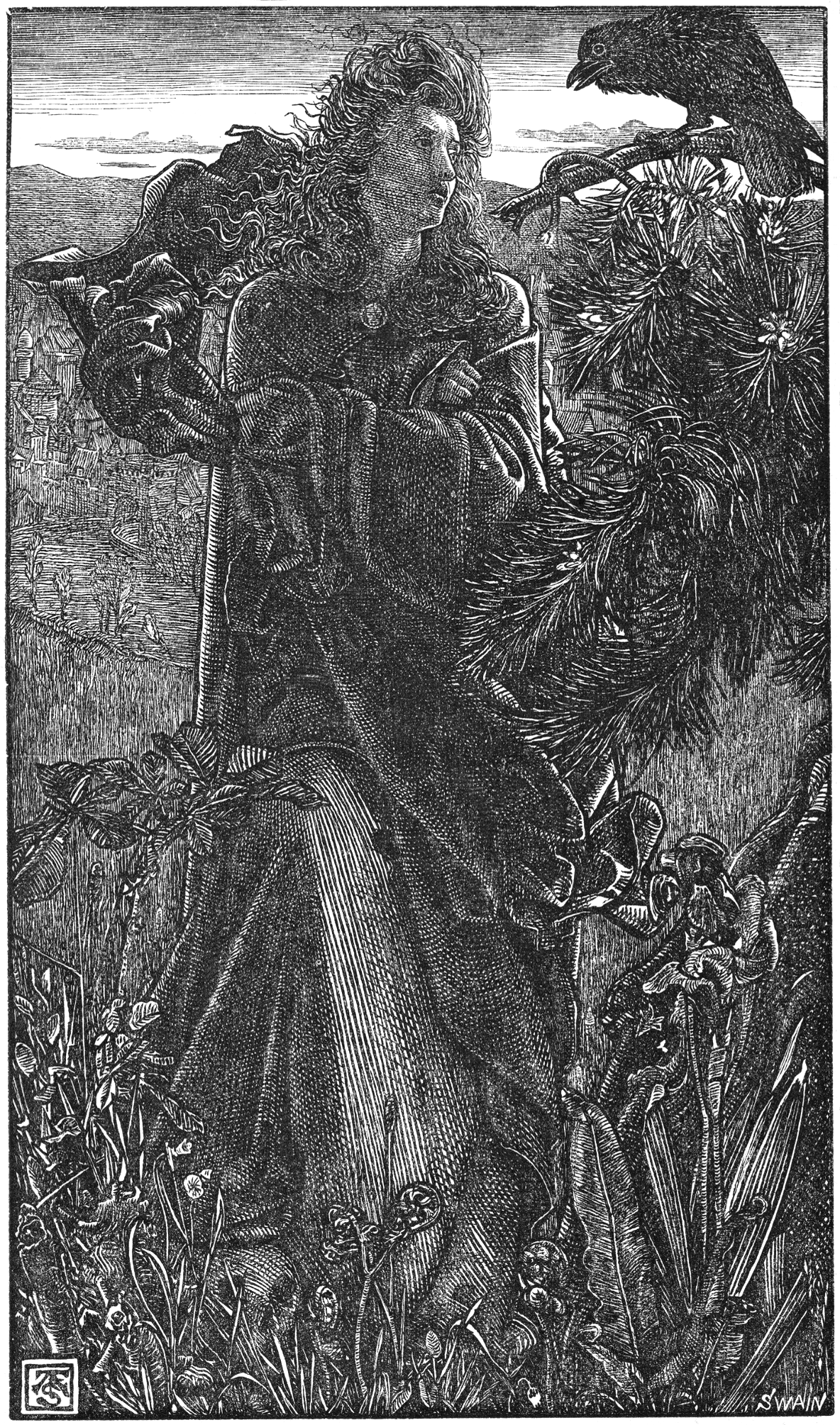
A valkyrie speaks with a raven in a wood-engraving by Joseph Swain after Frederick Sandys, 1862

The fragmentary skaldic poem Hrafnsmál (generally accepted as authored by 9th century Norwegian skald Þorbjörn Hornklofi) features a conversation between a valkyrie and a raven, largely consisting of the life and deeds of Harald I of Norway. The poem begins with a request for silence among noblemen so that the skald may tell the deeds of Harald Fairhair. The narrator states that they once overheard a "high-minded", "golden-haired" and "white-armed" maiden speaking with a "glossy-beaked raven". The valkyrie considers herself wise, understands the speech of birds, is further described as having a white-throat and sparkling eyes, and she takes no pleasure in men:

Wise thought her the valkyrie; were welcome never
men to the bright-eyed one, her who the birds' speech knew well.
Greeted the light-lashed maiden, the lily-throated woman,
The hymir's-skull-cleaver as on cliff he was perching.

The valkyrie, previously described as fair and beautiful, then speaks to the gore-drenched and corpse-reeking raven:

"How is it, ye ravens—whence are ye come now
with beaks all gory, at break of morning?
Carrion-reek ye carry, and your claws are bloody.
Were ye near, at night-time, where ye knew of corpses?"

The black raven shakes himself, and he responds that he and the rest of the ravens have followed Harald since hatching from their eggs. The raven expresses surprise that the valkyrie seems unfamiliar with the deeds of Harald, and tells her about his deeds for several stanzas. At stanza 15, a question and answer format begins where the valkyrie asks the raven a question regarding Harald, and the raven responds in turn. This continues until the poem ends abruptly.

=== Njáls saga ===
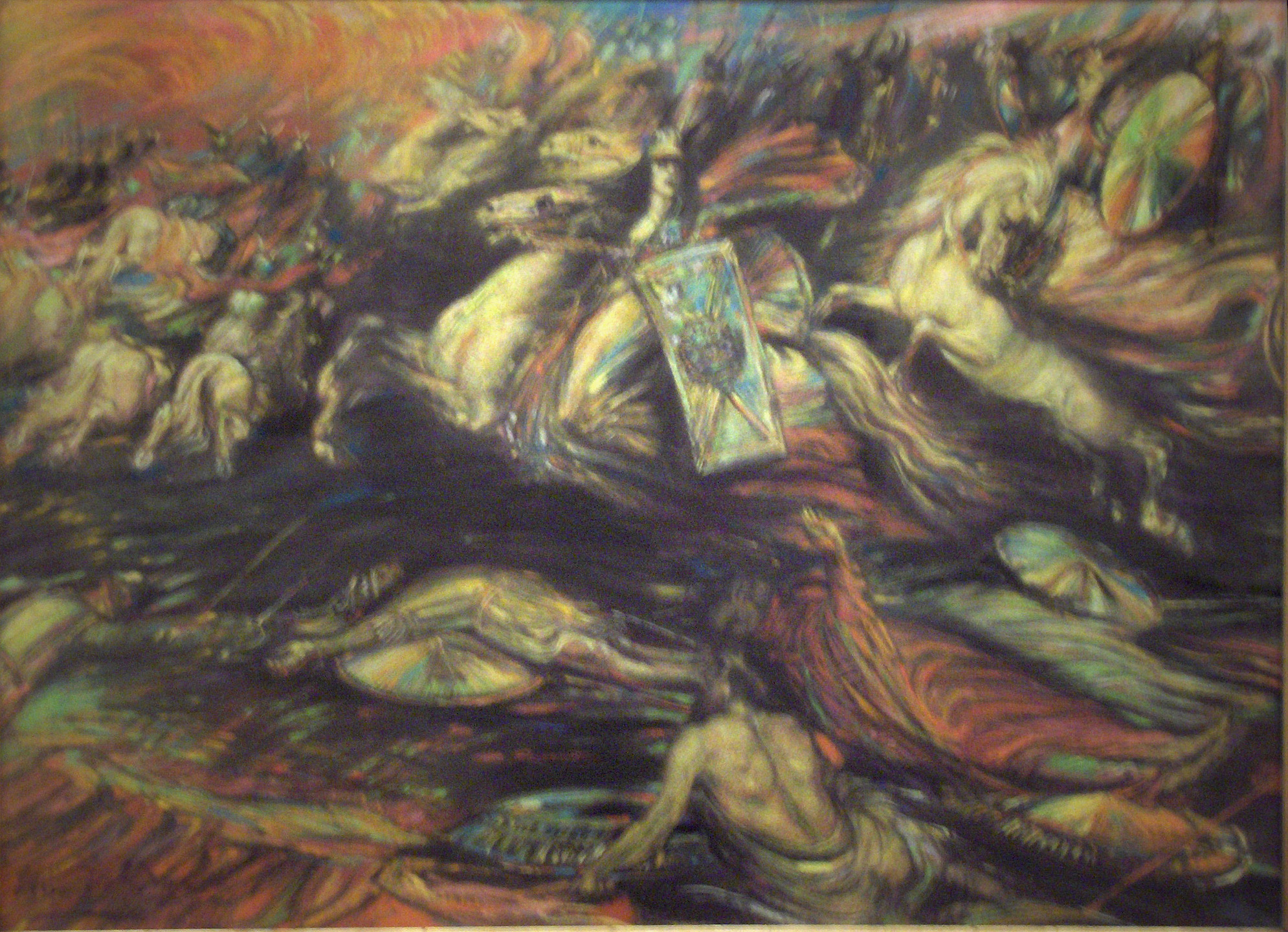
Ride of the Valkyries (around 1890) by Henry De Groux

In chapter 157 of Njáls saga, a man named Dörruð witnesses 12 people riding together to a stone hut on Good Friday in Caithness. The 12 go into the hut and Dörruð can no longer see them. Dörruð goes to the hut, and looks through a chink in the wall. He sees that there are women within, and that they have set up a particular loom; the heads of men are the weights, the entrails of men are the warp and weft, a sword is the shuttle, and the reels are composed of arrows. The women sing a song called Darraðarljóð, which Dörruð memorizes.

The song consists of 11 stanzas, and within it the valkyries weave and choose who is to be slain at the Battle of Clontarf (fought outside Dublin in 1014 CE). Of the 12 valkyries weaving, six have their names given in the song: Hildr, Hjörþrimul, Sanngriðr, Svipul, Guðr and Göndul. Stanza 9 of the song reads:

Now awful it is to be without,
as blood-red rack races overhead;
is the welkin gory with warriors' blood
as we valkyries war-songs chanted.

At the end of the poem, the valkyries sing "start we swiftly with steeds unsaddled—hence to battle with brandished swords!" The prose narrative picks up again, and says that the valkyries tear their loom down and into pieces. Each valkyrie holds on to what she has in her hands. Dörruð leaves the chink in the wall and heads home, and the women mount their horses and ride away; six to the south and six to the north.

=== Heimskringla ===
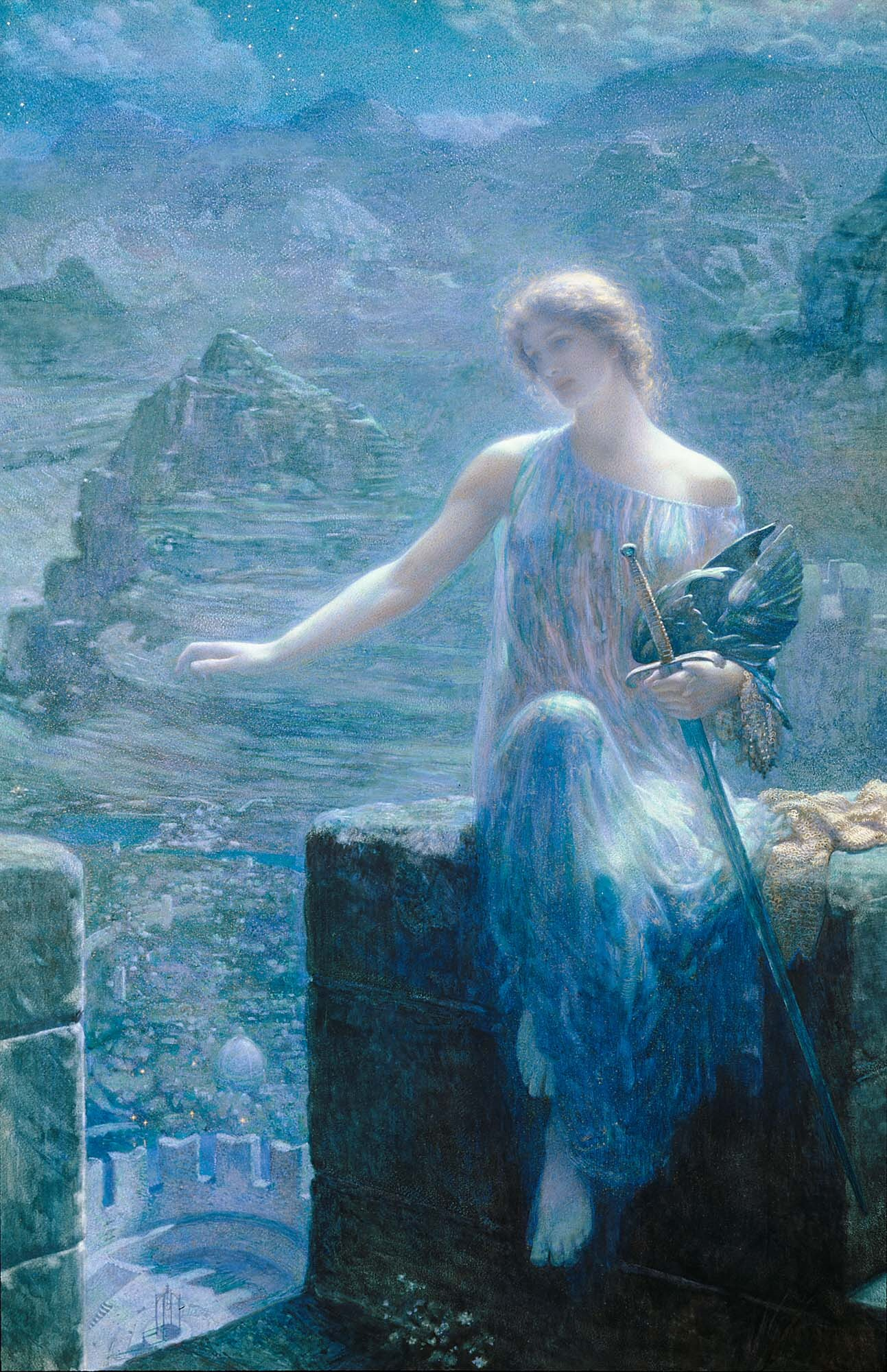
The Valkyrie's Vigil (1906) by Edward Robert Hughes

At the end of the Heimskringla saga Hákonar saga góða, the poem Hákonarmál by the 10th century skald Eyvindr skáldaspillir is presented. The saga relates that king Haakon I of Norway died in battle, and although he is Christian, he requests that since he has died "among heathens, then give me such burial place as seems most fitting to you". The saga relates that shortly after Haakon died on the same slab of rock that he was born upon, he was greatly mourned by friend and foe alike, and that his friends moved his body northward to Sæheim in North Hordaland. Haakon was buried there in a large burial mound in full armour and his finest clothing, yet with no other valuables. Further, "words were spoken over his grave according to the custom of heathen men, and they put him on the way to Valhalla". The poem Hákonarmál is then provided.

In Hákonarmál, Odin sends forth the two valkyries Göndul and Skögul to "choose among the kings' kinsmen" and who in battle should dwell with Odin in Valhalla. A battle rages with great slaughter, and part of the description employs the kenning "Skögul's-stormblast" for "battle". Haakon and his men die in battle, and they see the valkyrie Göndul leaning on a spear shaft. Göndul comments that "groweth now the gods' following, since Hákon has been with host so goodly bidden home with holy godheads". Haakon hears "what the valkyries said", and the valkyries are described as sitting "high-hearted on horseback", wearing helmets, carrying shields and that the horses wisely bore them. A brief exchange follows between Haakon and the valkyrie Skögul:

Hákon said:
"Why didst Geirskogul grudge us victory?
though worthy we were for the gods to grant it?"
Skogul said:
"'Tis owing to us that the issue was won
and your foemen fled."

Skögul says that they shall now ride forth to the "green homes of the godheads" to tell Odin the king will come to Valhalla. The poem continues, and Haakon becomes a part of the einherjar in Valhalla, awaiting to do battle with the monstrous wolf Fenrir.

=== Fagrskinna ===
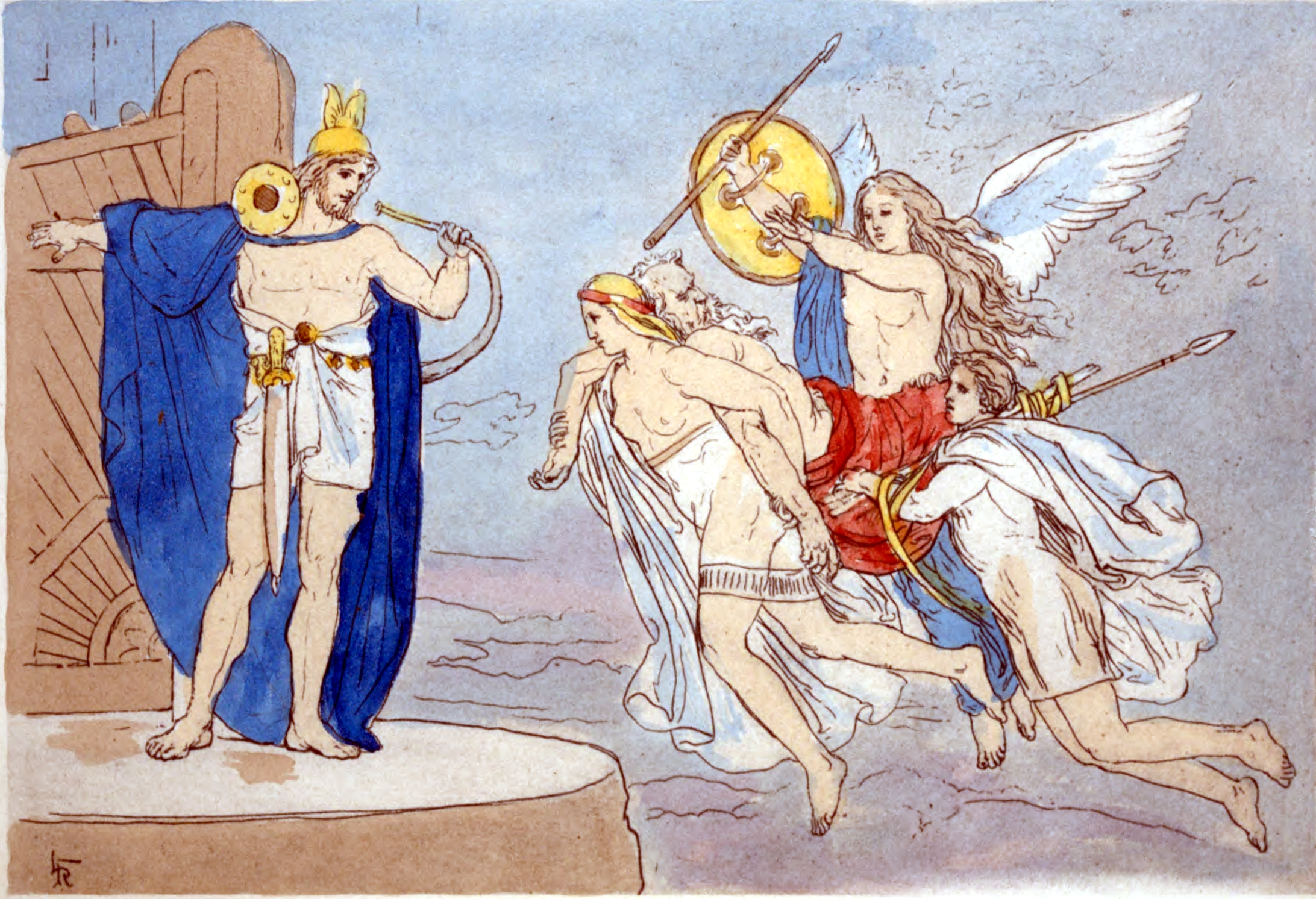
An illustration of valkyries encountering the god Heimdallr as they carry a dead man to Valhalla (1906) by Lorenz Frølich

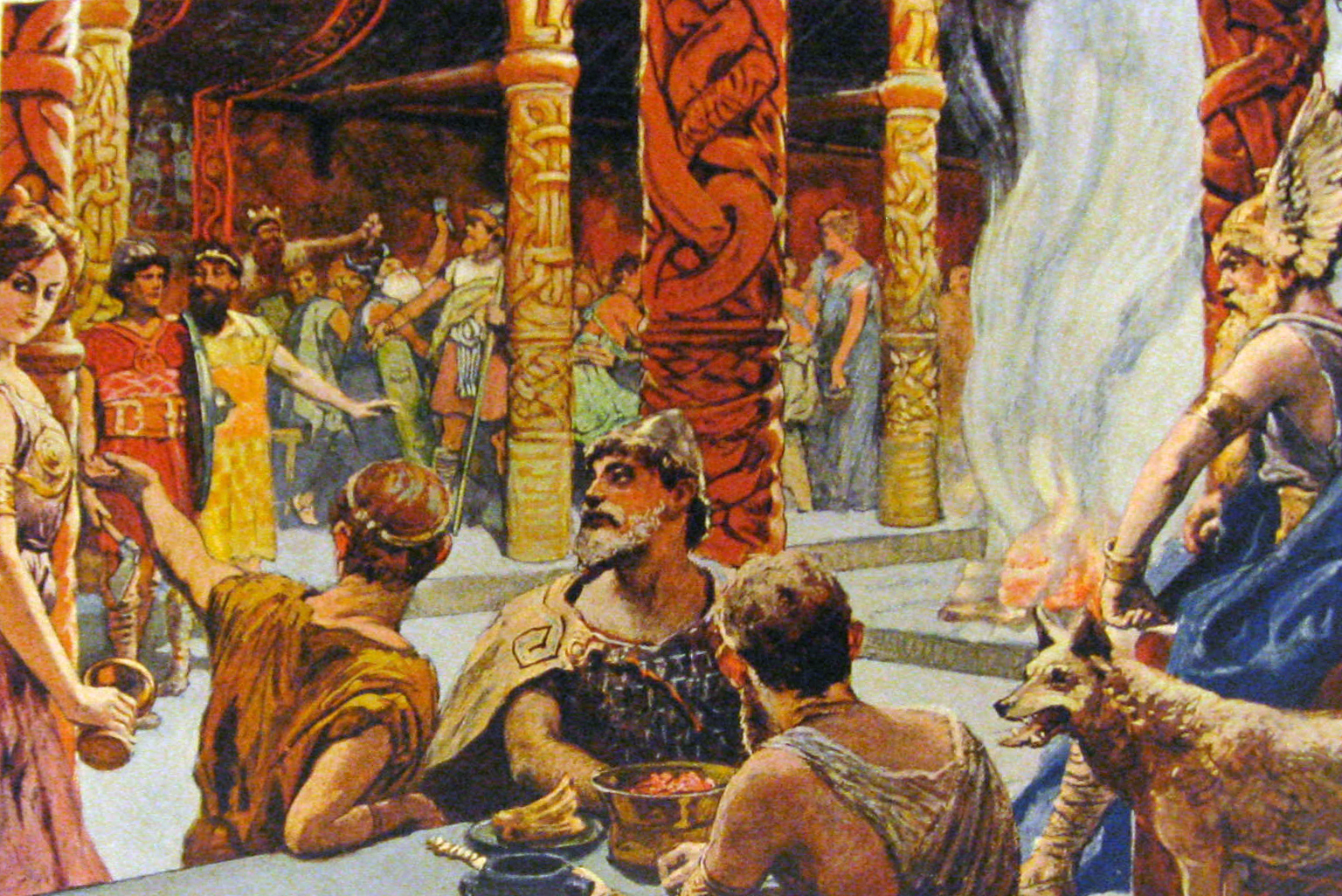
Valhalla (1905) by Emil Doepler

In chapter 8 of Fagrskinna, a prose narrative states that, after the death of her husband Eric Bloodaxe, Gunnhild Mother of Kings had a poem composed about him. The composition is by an anonymous author from the 10th century and is referred to as Eiríksmál. It describes Eric Bloodaxe and five other kings arriving in Valhalla after their death. The poem begins with comments by Odin (as Old Norse Óðinn):

'What kind of a dream is it,' said Óðinn,
in which just before daybreak,
I thought I cleared Valhǫll,
for coming of slain men?
I waked the Einherjar,
bade valkyries rise up,
to strew the bench,
and scour the beakers,

wine to carry,
as for a king's coming,
here to me I expect
heroes' coming from the world,
certain great ones,
so glad is my heart.

The god Bragi asks where a thundering sound is coming from, and says that the benches of Valhalla are creaking—as if the god Baldr had returned to Valhalla—and that it sounds like the movement of a thousand. Odin responds that Bragi knows well that the sounds are for Eric Bloodaxe, who will soon arrive in Valhalla. Odin tells the heroes Sigmund and Sinfjötli to rise to greet Eric and invite him into the hall, if it is indeed he.

=== Ragnhild Tregagás charm ===
A witchcraft trial held in 1324 in Bergen, Norway, records a spell used by the accused Ragnhild Tregagás to end the marriage of her former lover, a man named Bárd. The charm contains a mention of the valkyrie Göndul being "sent out":

I send out from me the spirits of (the valkyrie) Gondul.
May the first bite you in the back.
May the second bite you in the breast.
May the third turn hate and envy upon you.

== Old English attestations ==
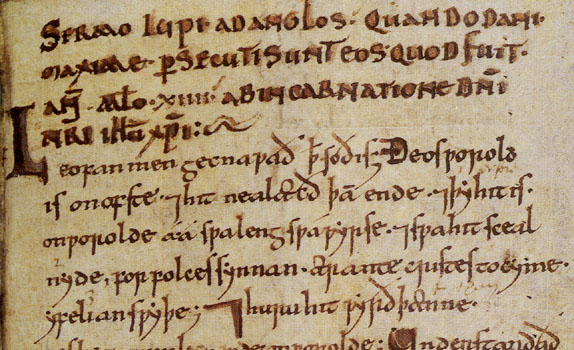
A page from Sermo Lupi ad Anglos ("The Sermon of the Wolf to the English")

The Old English wælcyrge appears several times in Old English manuscripts, generally to translate foreign concepts into Old English. It is used in the sermon Sermo Lupi ad Anglos, where it is thought to appear as a word for a human "sorceress". An early 11th-century manuscript of Aldhelm's De laudis virginitatis (Oxford, Bodleian library, Digby 146) glosses ueneris with wælcyrge (with gydene meaning "goddess"). wælcyrge is used to translate the names of the classical furies in two manuscripts (Cotton Cleopatra A. iii, and the older Corpus Glossary). In the manuscript Cotton Cleopatra A. iii, wælcyrge is also used to gloss the Roman goddess Bellona. A description of a raven flying over the Egyptian army appears as wonn wælceaseg (meaning "dark one choosing the slain"). Scholarly theories debate whether these attestations point to an indigenous belief among the Anglo-Saxons shared with the Norse, or if they were a result of later Norse influence (see section below).

== Archaeological record ==
=== Female figures, cups, and horn-bearers ===
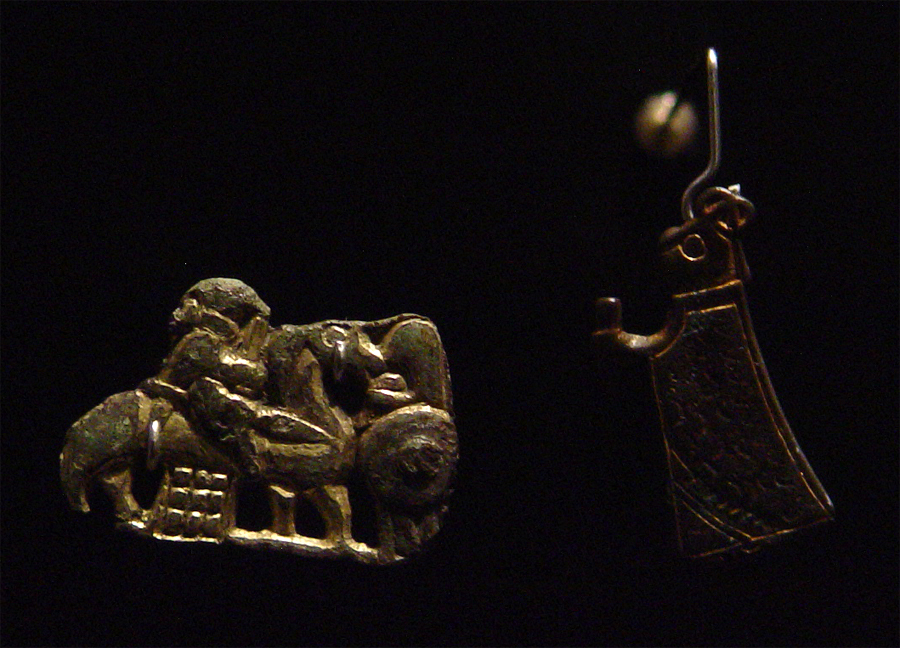
Viking Age jewellery thought to depict valkyries. On the left of the photograph is a female figure mounted on horseback with a 'winged' cavalry spear clamped under her leg and a sword in her hand. The mounted female is being greeted by another female figure who is carrying a shield. On the right of the photograph is one of numerous female silver figures usually described in museums and books as valkyries (right)

Viking Age stylized silver amulets depicting women wearing long gowns, their hair pulled back and knotted into a ponytail, sometimes bearing drinking horns, have been discovered throughout Scandinavia. These figures are commonly considered to represent valkyries or dísir. According to Mindy MacLeod and Bernard Mees, the amulets appear in Viking Age graves, and were presumably placed there because "they were thought to have protective powers".

The Tjängvide image stone from the Baltic island of Gotland, Sweden features a rider on an eight-legged horse, which may be Odin's eight-legged horse Sleipnir, being greeted by a female figure, which may be a valkyrie at Valhalla. The 11th century runestone U 1163 features a carving of a female figure bearing a horn that has been interpreted as the valkyrie Sigrdrífa handing the hero Sigurd (also depicted on the stone) a drinking horn.

In 2013, a small figure dated at around 800 AD was discovered in Hårby, Denmark by three amateur archaeologists. The figurine portrays a woman with long hair knotted into a ponytail who is wearing a long dress which is sleeveless and vest like at the top. Over the top of her dress she is wearing an embroidered apron. Her clothing keeps the woman's arms unobstructed so she can fight with the sword and shield she is holding. Commenting on the figure, archaeologist Mogens Bo Henriksen said that "there can hardly be any doubt that the figure depicts one of Odin's valkyries as we know them from the sagas as well as from Swedish picture stones from the time around AD700".

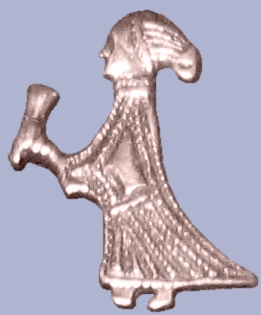
A silver figure of a woman holding a drinking horn found in Birka, Björkö, Uppland, Sweden.

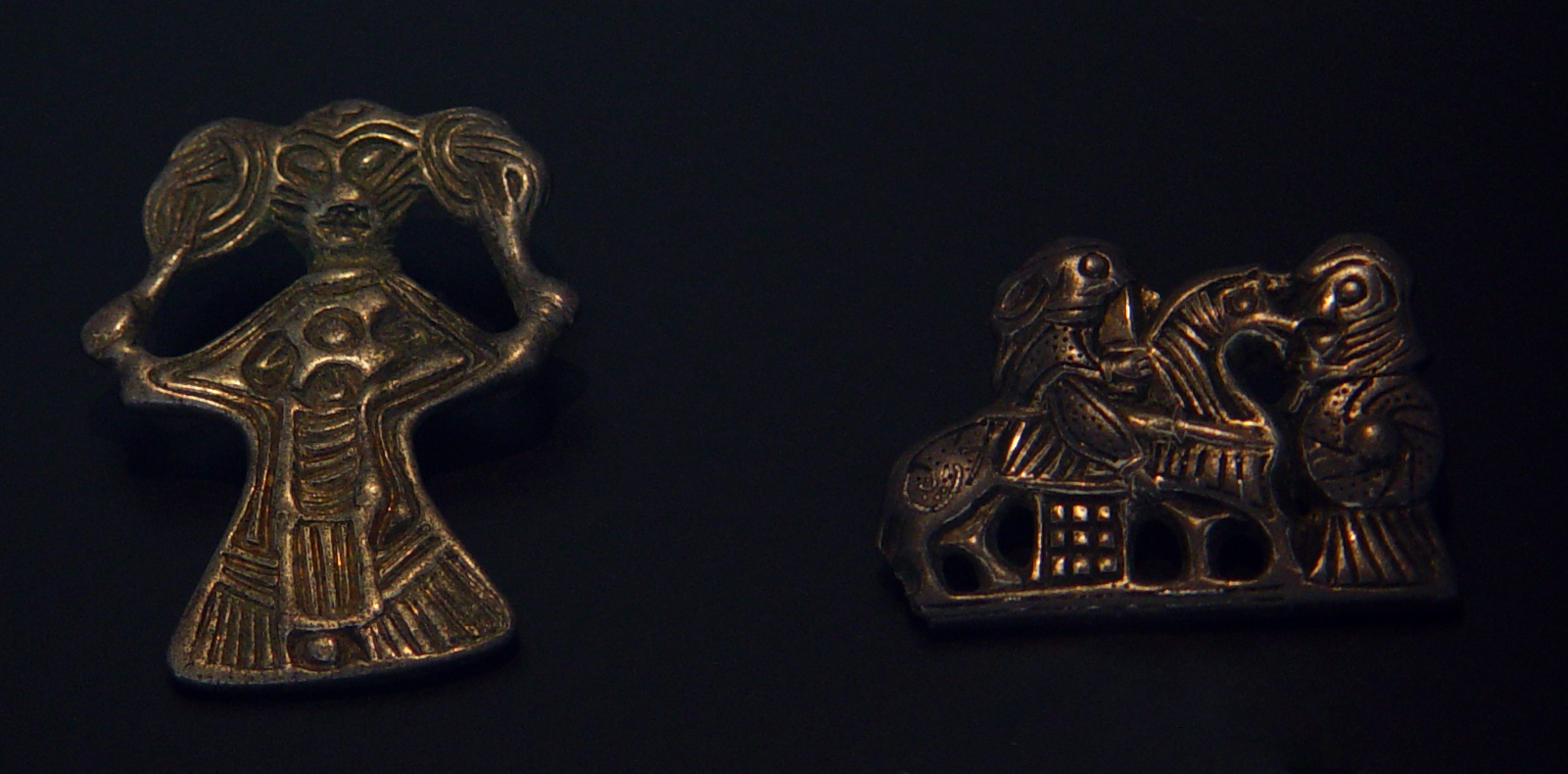
Both silver, a female figure touches her hair while facing forward (left) and a figure with a 'winged' spear clamped under her leg and sword in her hand sits atop a horse, facing another female figure who is carrying a shield (right).

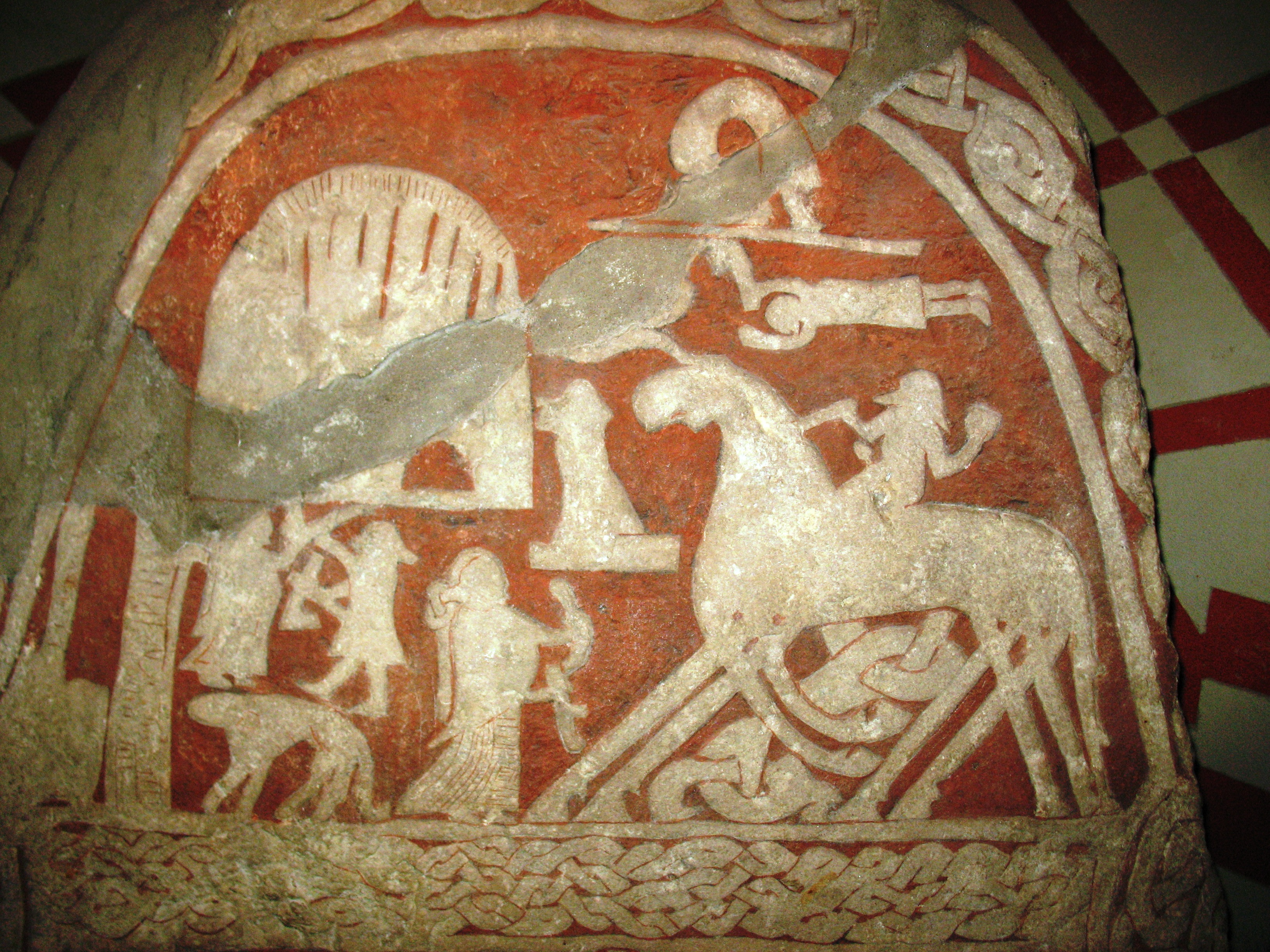
A female figure bears a horn to a rider on an eight-legged horse on the Tjängvide image stone in Sweden.

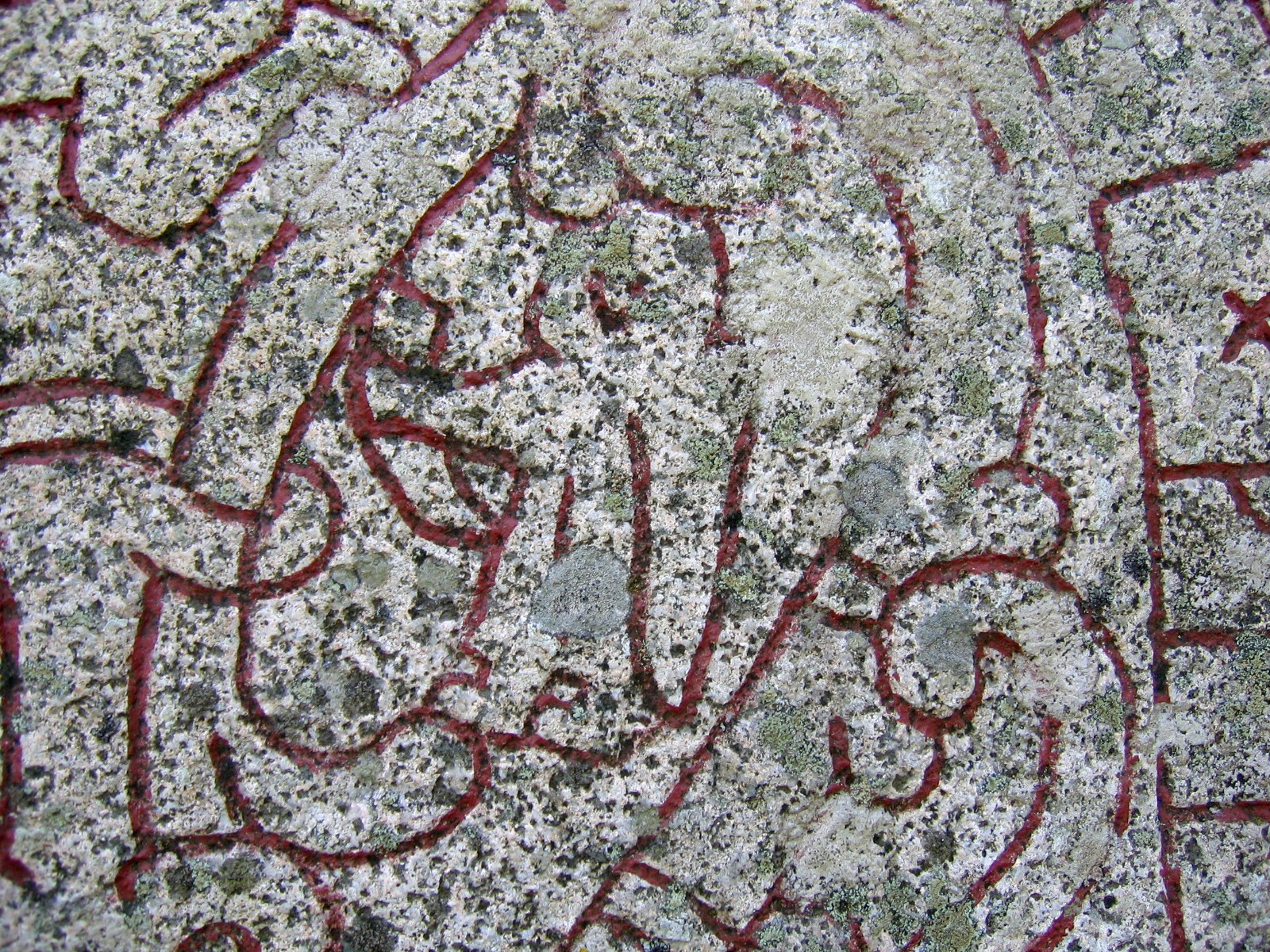
A female figure bearing a horn on runestone U 1163.

=== Runic inscriptions ===
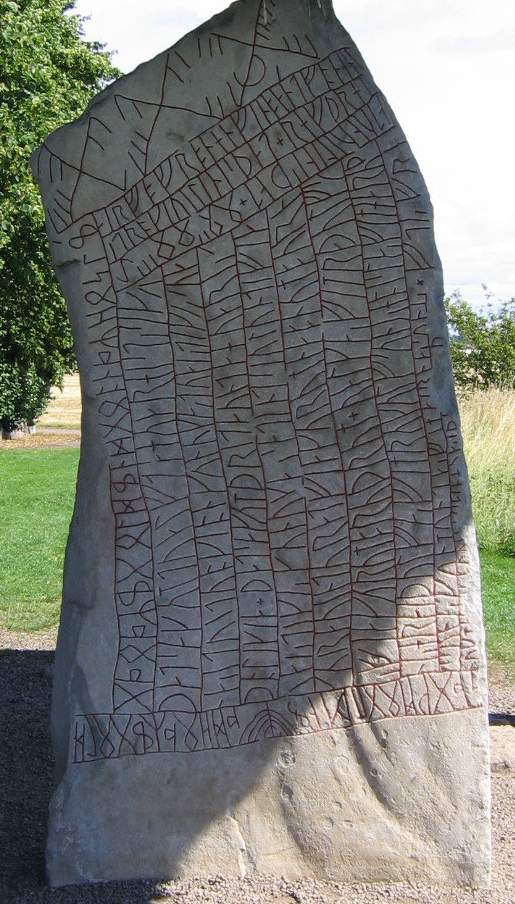
The Rök runestone

Specific valkyries are mentioned on two runestones; the early 9th century Rök runestone in Östergötland, Sweden, and the 10th-century Karlevi Runestone on the island of Öland, Sweden, which mentions the valkyrie Þrúðr. On the Rök runestone, a kenning is employed that involves a valkyrie riding a wolf as her steed:

That we tell the twelfth, where the horse of the Valkyrie [literally "the horse of Gunnr"] sees food on the battlefield, where twenty kings are lying.

Among the Bryggen inscriptions found in Bergen, Norway, is the "valkyrie stick" from the late 14th century. The stick features a runic inscription intended as a charm. The inscription says that "I cut cure-runes", and also "help-runes", once against elves, twice against trolls, thrice against thurs and then a mention of a valkyrie occurs:

Against the harmful skag-valkyrie,
so that she never shall, though she never would –
evil woman! – injure (?) your life.

This is followed by "I send you, I look at you, wolfish perversion, and unbearable desire, may distress descend on you and jöluns wrath. Never shall you sit, never shall you sleep ... (that you) love me as yourself." According to Mindy MacLeod and Bernard Mees, the inscription "seems to begin as a benevolent formulation before abruptly switching to the infliction of distress and misery, presumably upon the recipient of the charm rather than the baleful valkyrie", and they posit the final line appears "to constitute a rather spiteful kind of charm aimed at securing the love of a woman".

MacLeod and Mees state that the opening lines of the charm correspond to the Poetic Edda poem Sigrdrífumál, where the valkyrie Sigrdrífa provides runic advice, and that the meaning of the term skag is unclear, but a cognate exists in Helgakviða Hundingsbana I where Sinfjötli accuses Guðmundr of having once been a "skass-valkyrie". MacLeod and Mees believe the word means something like "supernatural sending", and that this points to a connection to the Ragnhild Tregagás charm, where a valkyrie is also "sent forth".

== Valkyrie names ==
The Old Norse poems Völuspá, Grímnismál, Darraðarljóð and the Nafnaþulur section of the Prose Edda book Skáldskaparmál, provide lists of valkyrie names. In addition, some valkyrie names appear solely outside of these lists, such as Sigrún (who is attested in the poems Helgakviða Hundingsbana I and Helgakviða Hundingsbana II). Many valkyrie names emphasize associations with battle and, in many cases, on the spear—a weapon heavily associated with the god Odin. Some scholars propose that the names of the valkyries themselves contain no individuality, but are rather descriptive of the traits and nature of war-goddesses, and are possibly the descriptive creations of skalds.

Some valkyrie names may be descriptive of the roles and abilities of the valkyries. The valkyrie name Herja has been theorised as pointing to a connection to the name of the goddess Hariasa, who is attested from a stone from 187 CE. The name Herfjötur has been theorised as pointing to the ability of the valkyries to place fetters. The name Svipul may be descriptive of the influence the valkyries have over wyrd or ørlog—a Germanic concept of fate.

== Theories ==
=== Old English wælcyrge and Old English charms ===
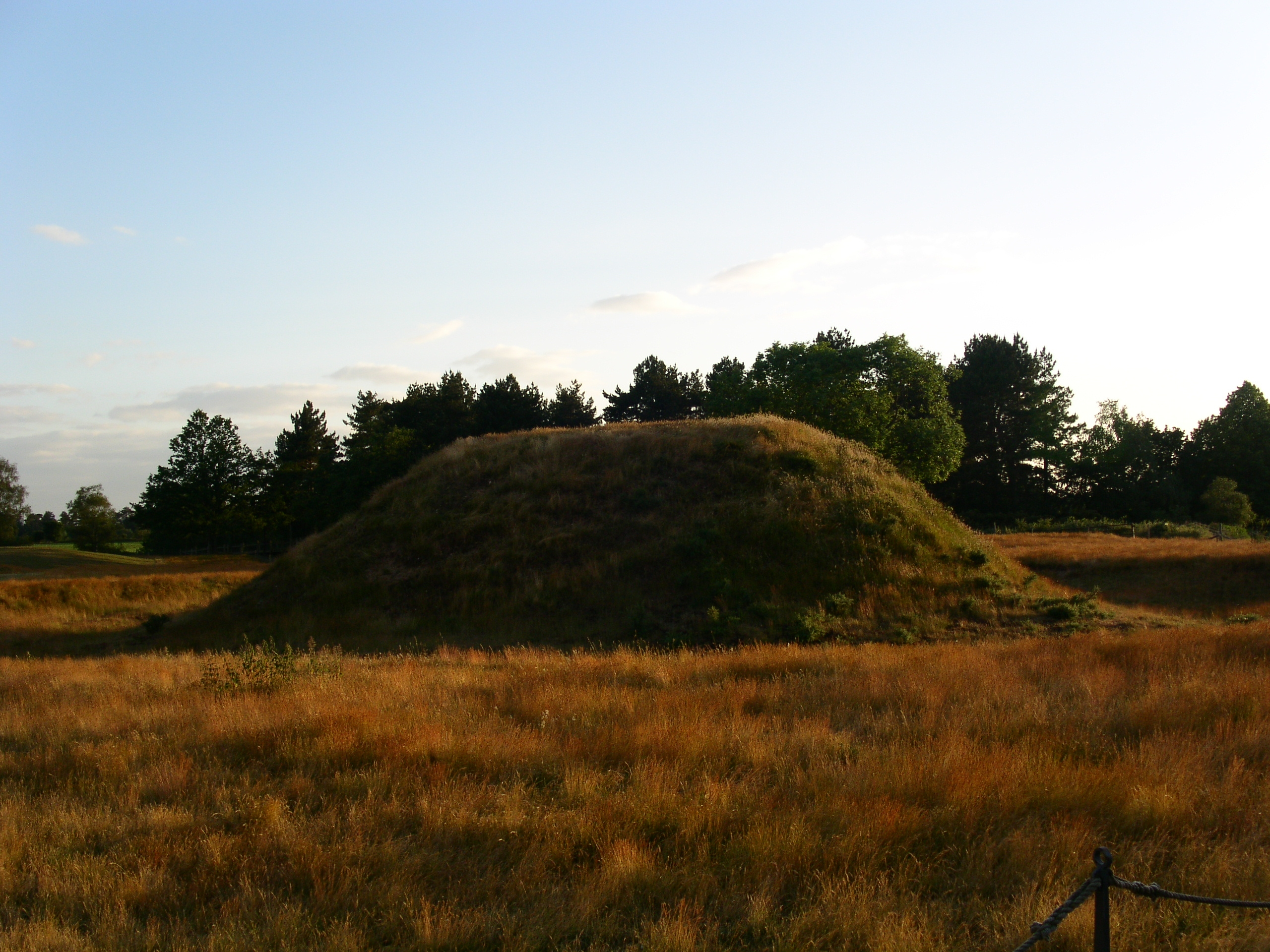
An Anglo-Saxon burial mound at Sutton Hoo in Suffolk, England

Richard North says that the description of a raven flying over the English army (glossed as wonn wælceaseg) may have been directly influenced by the Old Norse concept of Valhalla, the usage of wælcyrge in De laudibus virginitatis may represent a loan or loan-translation of Old Norse valkyrja, but the Cotton Cleopatra A. iii and the Corpus Glossary instances "appear to show an Anglo-Saxon conception of wælcyrge that was independent of contemporary Scandinavian influence".

Two Old English charms mention figures that are theorised as representing an Anglo-Saxon notion of valkyries or valkyrie-like female beings; Wið færstice, a charm to cure a sudden pain or stitch, and For a Swarm of Bees, a charm to keep honey bees from swarming. In Wið færstice, a sudden pain is attributed to a small, "shrieking" spear thrown with supernatural strength (mægen) by "fierce" loudly flying "mighty women" (mihtigan wif) who have ridden over a burial mound:

They were loud, yes, loud,
when they rode over the (burial) mound;
they were fierce when they rode across the land.
Shield yourself now, you can survive this strife.
Out, little spear, if there is one here within.
It stood under/behind lime-wood (i.e. a shield), under a light-coloured/light-weight shield,
where those mighty women marshalled their powers, and they send shrieking spears.

Theories have been proposed that these figures are connected to valkyries. Richard North says that "though it is not clear what the poet takes these women to be, their female sex, riding in flight and throwing spears suggest that they were imagined in England as women being analogous to the later Norse valkyrjur." Hilda Ellis Davidson theorizes that Wið færstice was originally a battle spell that had, over time, been reduced to evoke "a prosaic stitch in the side". Towards the end of For a Swarm of Bees, the swarming bees are referred to as "victory-women" (Old English sigewif):

Settle down, victory-women,
never be wild and fly to the woods.
Be as mindful of my welfare,
as is each man of eating and of home.

The term "victory women" has been theorised as pointing to an association with valkyries. This theory is not universally accepted, and the reference has also been theorised as a simple metaphor for the "victorious sword" (the stinging) of the bees.

=== Merseburg Incantation, fetters, dísir, idisi and norns ===
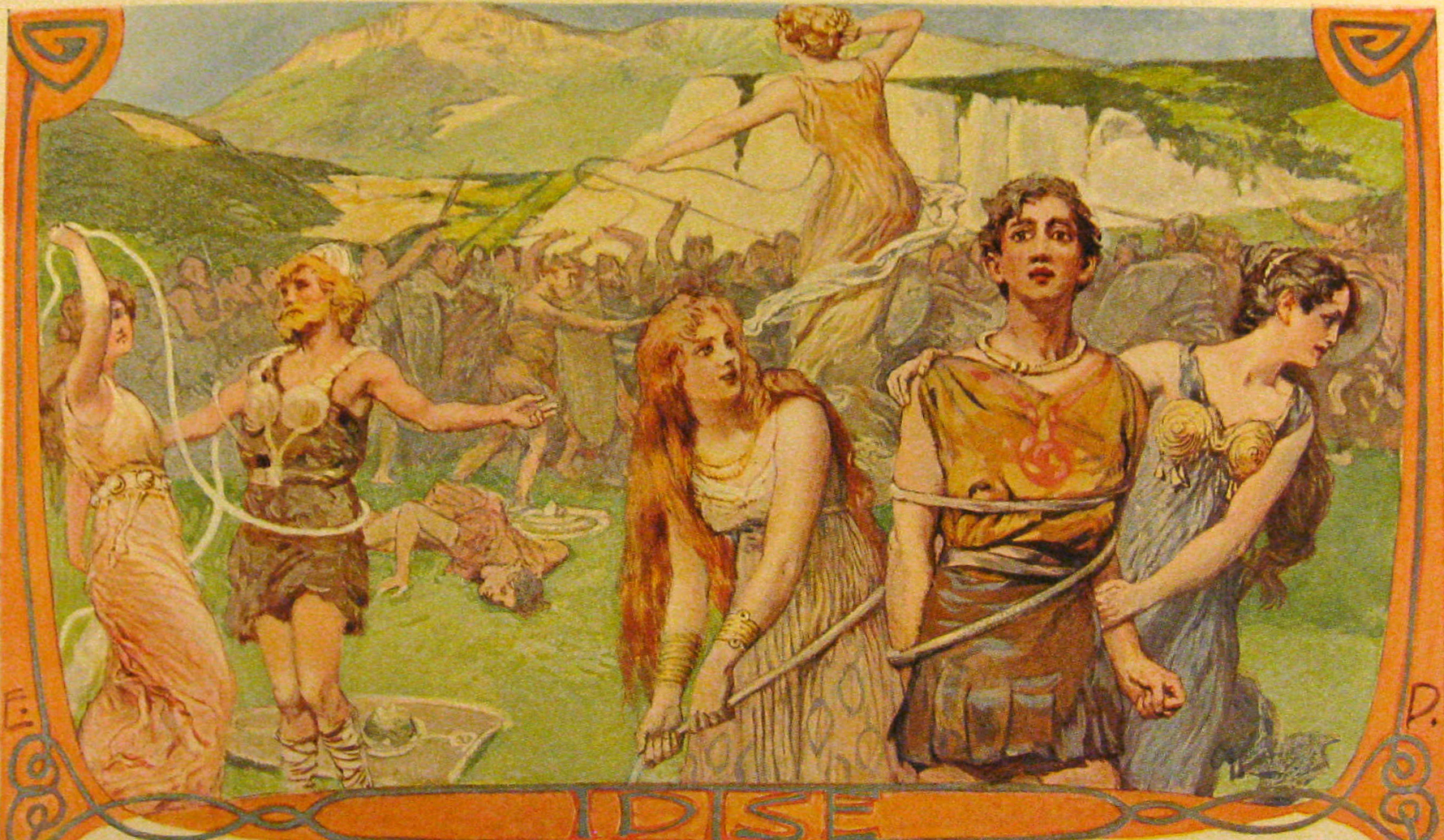
Idise (1905) by Emil Doepler

One of the two Old High German Merseburg Incantations call upon female beings—Idisi—to bind and hamper an army. The incantation reads:

Once the Idisi sat, sat here and there,
some bound fetters, some hampered the army,
some untied fetters:
Escape from the fetters, flee from the enemies.

The Idisi mentioned in the incantation are generally considered to be valkyries. Rudolf Simek says that "these Idisi are obviously a kind of valkyrie, as these also have the power to hamper enemies in Norse mythology" and points to a connection with the valkyrie name Herfjötur (Old Norse "army-fetter"). Hilda R. Davidson compares the incantation to the Old English Wið færstice charm and theorises a similar role for them both.

Simek says that the West Germanic term Idisi (Old Saxon: idis, Old High German: itis, Old English: ides) refers to a "dignified, well respected woman (married or unmarried), possibly a term for any woman, and therefore glosses exactly Latin matrona" and that a link to the North Germanic term dísir is reasonable to assume, yet not undisputed. Also notable is the place name Idisiaviso (meaning "plain of the Idisi") where forces commanded by Arminius fought those commanded by Germanicus at the Battle of the Weser River in 16 AD. Simek points to a connection between the name Idisiaviso, the role of the Idisi in one of the two Merseburg Incantations and valkyries.

Regarding the dísir, Simek states that Old Norse dís appears commonly as simply a term for "woman", just as Old High German itis, Old Saxon idis and Old English ides, and may have also been used to denote a type of goddess. According to Simek, "several of the Eddic sources might lead us to conclude that the dísir were valkyrie-like guardians of the dead, and indeed in Guðrúnarkviða I 19 the valkyries are even called Herjans dísir "Odin's dísir". The dísir are explicitly called dead women in Atlamál 28 and a secondary belief that the dísir were the souls of dead women (see fylgjur) also underlies the landdísir of Icelandic folklore. Simek says that "as the function of the matrons was also extremely varied—fertility goddess, personal guardians, but also warrior-goddesses—the belief in the dísir, like the belief in the valkyries, norns and matrons, may be considered to be different manifestations of a belief in a number of female (half-?) goddesses."

Jacob Grimm states that, though the norns and valkyries are similar in nature, there is a fundamental difference between the two. Grimm states that a dís can be both norn and a valkyrie, "but their functions are separate and usually the persons. The norns have to pronounce the fatum [fate], they sit on their chairs, or they roam through the country among mortals, fastening their threads. Nowhere is it said that they ride. The valkyrs ride to war, decide the issues of fighting, and conduct the fallen to heaven; their riding is like that of heroes and gods".

=== Origins and development ===
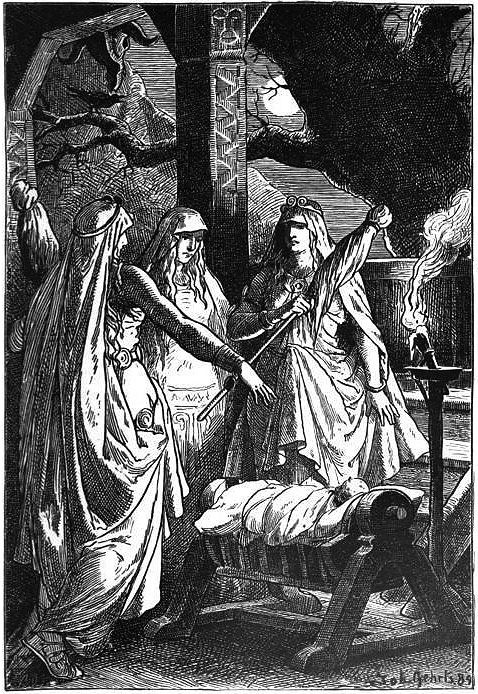
The Norns (1889) by Johannes Gehrts

Various theories have been proposed about the origins and development of the valkyries from Germanic paganism to later Norse mythology. Rudolf Simek suggests valkyries were probably originally viewed as "demons of the dead to whom warriors slain on the battlefield belonged", and that a shift in interpretation of the valkyries may have occurred "when the concept of Valhalla changed from a battlefield to a warrior's paradise". Simek says that this original concept was "superseded by the shield girls—Irish female warriors who lived on like the einherjar in Valhall." Simek says that the valkyries were closely associated with Odin, and that this connection existed in an earlier role as "demons of death". Simek states that due to the shift of concept, the valkyries became popular figures in heroic poetry, and during this transition were stripped of their "demonic characteristics and became more human, and therefore become capable of falling in love with mortals [...]." Simek says that the majority of the names of the valkyries point to a warlike function, that most of valkyrie names do not appear to be very old, and that the names "mostly come from poetic creativity rather than from real folk-belief."

MacLeod and Mees theorise that "the role of the corpse-choosing valkyries became increasingly confused in later Norse mythology with that of the Norns, the supernatural females responsible for determining human destiny [...]."

Hilda Ellis Davidson says that, regarding valkyries, "evidently an elaborate literary picture has been built up by generations of poets and storytellers, in which several conceptions can be discerned. We recognise something akin to Norns, spirits who decide destinies of men; to the seeresses, who could protect men in battle with their spells; to the powerful female guardian spirits attached to certain families, bringing luck to youth under their protection; even to certain women who armed themselves and fought like men, for whom there is some historical evidence from the regions round the Black Sea". She adds that there may also be a memory in this of a "priestess of the god of war, women who officiated at the sacrificial rites when captives were put to death after battle."

Davidson places emphasis on the fact that valkyrie literally means "chooser of the slain". She compares Wulfstan's mention of a "chooser of the slain" in his Sermo Lupi ad Anglos sermon, which appears among "a blacklist of sinners, witches and evildoers", to "all the other classes whom he [Wulfstan] mentions", and concludes as those "are human ones, it seems unlikely that he has introduced mythological figures as well." Davidson points out that Arab traveller Ibn Fadlan's detailed account of a 10th-century Rus ship funeral on the Volga River features an "old Hunnish woman, massive and grim to look upon" (who Fadlan refers to as the "Angel of Death") who organises the killing of the slave girl, and has two other women with her that Fadlan refers to as her daughters. Davidson says that "it would hardly be surprising if strange legends grew up about such women, who must have been kept apart from their kind due to their gruesome duties. Since it was often decided by lot which prisoners should be killed, the idea that the god "chose" his victims, through the instrument of the priestesses, must have been a familiar one, apart from the obvious assumption that some were chosen to fall in war." Davidson says that it appears that from "early times" the Germanic peoples "believed in fierce female spirits doing the command of the war god, stirring up disorder, taking part in battle, seizing and perhaps devouring the slain."

=== Freyja and Fólkvangr ===
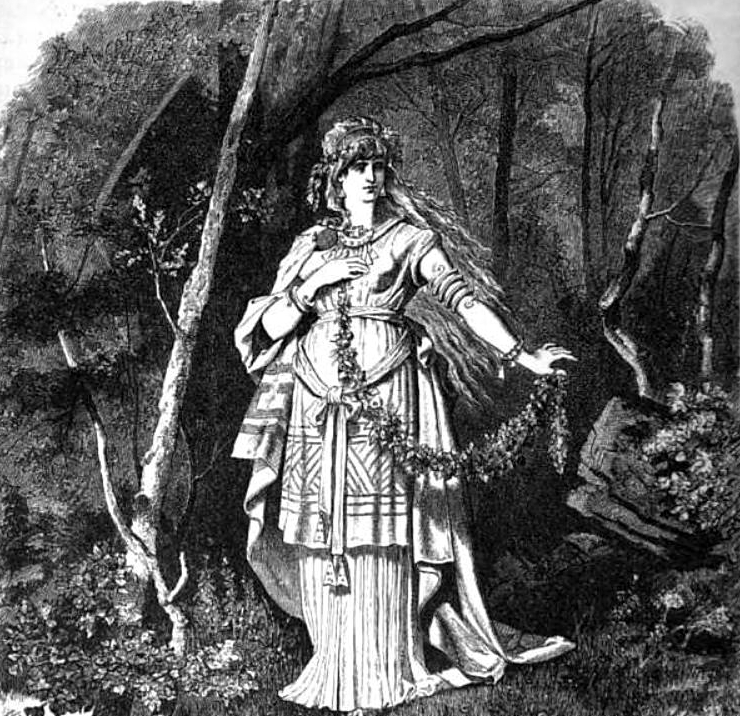
Freya (1882) by Carl Emil Doepler

The goddess Freyja and her afterlife field Fólkvangr, where she receives half of the slain, has been theorized as connected to the valkyries. Britt-Mari Näsström points out the description in Gylfaginning where it is said of Freyja "whenever she rides into battle she takes half of the slain", and interprets Fólkvangr as "the field of the Warriors". Näsström notes that, just like Odin, Freyja receives slain heroes who have died on the battlefield, and that her house is Sessrumnir (which she translates as "filled with many seats"), a dwelling that Näsström posits likely fills the same function as Valhalla. Näsström comments that "still, we must ask why there are two heroic paradises in the Old Norse view of afterlife. It might possibly be a consequence of different forms of initiation of warriors, where one part seemed to have belonged to Óðinn and the other to Freyja. These examples indicate that Freyja was a war-goddess, and she even appears as a valkyrie, literally 'the one who chooses the slain'."

Siegfried Andres Dobat comments that "in her mythological role as the chooser of half the fallen warriors for her death-realm Fólkvangr, the goddess Freyja, however, emerges as the mythological role-model for the Valkyrjar [sic] and the dísir."

== Modern art ==
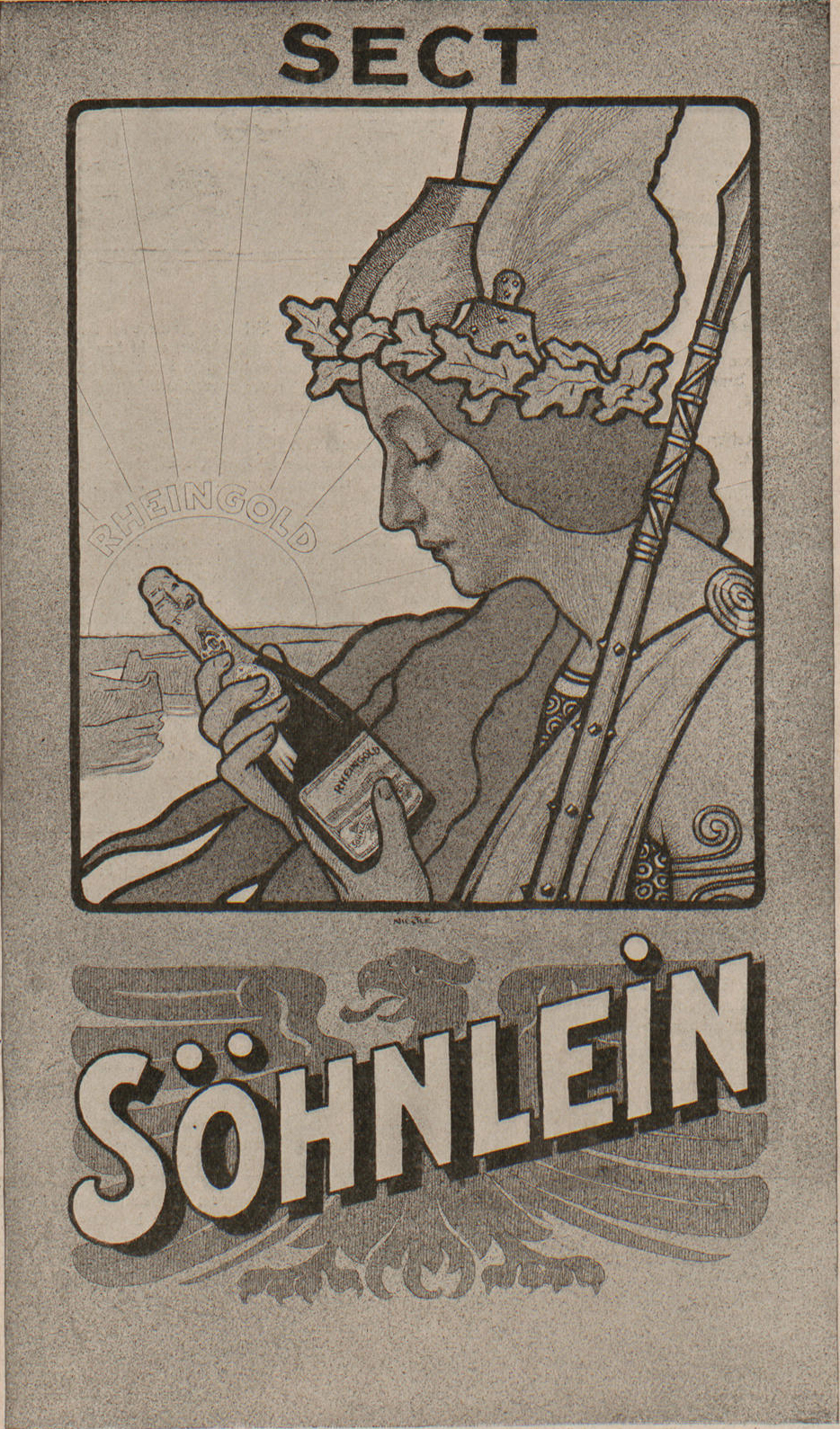
A valkyrie examines a bottle of Söhnlein's "Rheingold" sekt in a 1908 Jugendstil advertisement

Valkyries have been the subjects of various poems, stories, works of visual art, musical works, movies, TV-series and cartoons, comic books, and video games.

In poetry, valkyries appear in "Die Walküren" by H. Heine (appearing in Romanzero, 1847), "Die Walküren" (1864) by H. v. Linge, and "Sköldmon" (appearing in Gömda Land, 1904). In music, they appear in Die Walküre by Richard Wagner (1870), from which the "Ride of the Valkyries" is the best-known theme. In literature, Valkyries make an appearance in Hans Christian Andersen's fairy tale "The Marsh King's Daughter".

Works of visual art depicting valkyries include Die Walküren (sketch, 1818) by J. G. Sandberg, Reitende Walküre (fresco), previously located in Munich palace but now destroyed, 1865–66 by M. Echter, Valkyrien and Valkyriens død (paintings, both from 1860), Walkürenritt (etching, 1871) by A. Welti, Walkürenritt (woodcut, 1871) by T. Pixis, Walkürenritt (1872) by A. Becker (reproduced in 1873 with the same title by A. v. Heyde), Die Walkyren (charcoal, 1880) and Walkyren wählen und wecken die gefallenen Helden (Einherier), um sie vom Schlachtfield nach Walhall zu geleiten (painting, 1882) and Walkyrenschlacht (oil painting, 1884) by K. Ehrenberg, Walkürenritt (oil painting, 1888, and etching, 1890) by A. Welti, Walküre (statue) by H. Günther, Walkürenritt (oil painting) by H. Hendrich, Walkürenritt (painting) by F. Leeke, Einherier (painting, from around 1900), by K. Dielitz, The Ride of the Valkyries (painting, from around 1900) by J. C. Dollman, Valkyrie (statue, 1910) and Walhalla-freeze (located in the Ny Carlsberg Glyptotek, Copenhagen, 1886–87), Walkyrien (print, 1915) by A. Kolb, and Valkyrier (drawing, 1925) by E. Hansen.

Valkyries are also referenced in modern books. A selection of female characters in the popular book series, A Court of Thorns and Roses, are elevated to the status of Valkyrie after completing a rigorous physical training program and subsequently revive the lost Valkyrie community. In comic books, a valkyrie is featured in the form of the eponymous Marvel Comics character Valkyrie (1972–onwards).

In movies, the aforementioned Marvel comic book character is depicted by Tessa Thompson in Thor: Ragnarok (2017), Avengers: Endgame (2019), Thor: Love and Thunder (2022) and The Marvels (2023). There is also a valkyrie in Battle Beyond the Stars (1980) and The Northman (2022). In TV, valkyries are featured in the Bugs Bunny and Elmer Fudd version of Der Ring des Nibelungen in the Merrie Melodies cartoon What's Opera, Doc? (1957), and in the episode The Rheingold (2000) of Xena: Warrior Princess.

In video games, valkyries are featured in Gauntlet (1985), the Valkyrie Profile series (1999–onwards), Age of Mythology (2002), Odin Sphere (2007; remake in 2016), God of War (2018) and God of War Ragnarök (2022), and Valkyrie Elysium (2022). The aforementioned Marvel character Valkyrie features in various video games based on Marvel comics and the Marvel Cinematic Universe, including Marvel Heroes and Lego Marvel's Avengers (see full list in the Valkyrie article).

== See also ==
- Daena, Zoroastrian goddess of Conscience, guiding good and pure souls over the Chinvat Bridge to the House of Song, Zoroastrian paradise.
- Fravahr, the innumerable heavenly host of warrior-spirits of the dead in Zoroastrianism
- Apsara, type of female spirit of the clouds and waters in Hindu and Buddhist culture
- Keres, Greek goddesses of violent death
- Valravn, a supernatural "raven of the slain" appearing in 19th-century Danish folk songs
- Aston Martin Valkyrie, a hybrid sports car launched by Aston Martin in 2018
- Golden State Valkyries, an American Women's National Basketball Association (WNBA) team in San Francisco

== General and cited references ==
- Andrén, A.; Jennbert, K.; Raudvere, C. (2006) "Old Norse Religion: Some Problems and Prospects" in Old Norse Religion in Long Term Perspectives: Origins, Changes and Interactions, an International Conference in Lund, Sweden, 3–7 June 2004. Nordic Academic Press. ISBN 91-89116-81-X
- Byock, Jesse (trans.) (2006). The Prose Edda. Penguin Classics. ISBN 0-14-044755-5
- Davidson, Hilda Roderick Ellis (1988). Myths and Symbols in Pagan Europe: Early Scandinavian and Celtic Religions. Manchester University Press. ISBN 0-7190-2579-6
- Davidson, Hilda Roderick Ellis (1990). Gods and Myths of Northern Europe. Penguin Books. ISBN 0-14-013627-4
- Dobat, Siegfried Andres (2006). "Bridging mythology and belief: Viking Age functional culture as a reflection of the belief in divine intervention" in Andren, A.; Jennbert, K.; Raudvere, C. Old Norse Religion in Long Term Perspectives: Origins, Changes and Interactions, an International Conference in Lund, Sweden, 3–7 June 2004. Nordic Academic Press. ISBN 91-89116-81-X
- Dronke, Ursula (Trans.) (1997). The Poetic Edda: Volume II: Mythological Poems. Oxford University Press. ISBN 0-19-811181-9
- Faulkes, Anthony (Trans.) (1995). Edda. Everyman. ISBN 0-460-87616-3
- Finlay, Alison (2004). Fagrskinna, a Catalogue of the Kings of Norway: A Translation with Introduction and Notes. Brill Publishers. ISBN 90-04-13172-8
- Friðriksdóttir, Jóhanna Katrín (2020) Valkyrie: The Women of the Viking World (Bloomsbury Academic) ISBN 9781788314770
- Greenfield, Stanley B.; Calder, Daniel Gillmore; Lapidge, Michael (1996). A New Critical History of Old English Literature. New York University Press. ISBN 0-8147-3088-4
- Grimm, Jacob (1882) translated by James Steven Stallybrass. Teutonic Mythology: Translated from the Fourth Edition with Notes and Appendix by James Stallybrass. Volume I. London: George Bell and Sons.
- Hall, Alaric (2007). Elves in Anglo-Saxon England. Boydell Press. ISBN 1-84383-294-1
- Kennedy, Maev (2013). "Flight of the valkyrie: the Viking figurine that's heading for Britain". Theguardian.com, Monday 4 March 2013. Online:
- Hollander, Lee Milton (1980). Old Norse Poems: The Most Important Nonskaldic Verse Not Included in the Poetic Edda. Forgotten Books. ISBN 1-60506-715-6
- Hollander, Lee Milton (Trans.) (2007). Heimskringla: History of the Kings of Norway. University of Texas Press. ISBN 978-0-292-73061-8
- Finnur Jónsson (1973). Den Norsk-Islandske Skjaldedigtning. Rosenkilde og Bagger. (in Danish)
- Larrington, Carolyne (Trans.) (1999). The Poetic Edda. Oxford World's Classics. ISBN 0-19-283946-2
- Lindow, John (2001). Norse Mythology: A Guide to the Gods, Heroes, Rituals and Beliefs. Oxford University Press. ISBN 0-19-515382-0
- MacLeod, Mindy; Mees, Bernard (2006). Runic Amulets and Magic Objects. Boydell Press. ISBN 1-84383-205-4
- McTurk, Rory W. (1991). Studies in Ragnars saga Loðbrókar and its Major Scandinavian Analogues. The Society for the Study of Mediæval Languages and Literature, Oxford. ISBN 0-907570-08-9.
- Näsström, Britt-Mari (1999). "Freyja: The Trivalent Goddess" in Sand, Reenberg Erik; Sørensen, Jørgen Podemann (1999). Comparative Studies in History of Religions: Their Aim, Scrope and Validity. Museum Tusculanum Press. ISBN 87-7289-533-0
- North, Richard (1997). Heathen Gods in Old English Literature. Cambridge University Press. ISBN 0-521-55183-8
- Orchard, Andy (1997). Dictionary of Norse Myth and Legend. Cassell. ISBN 0-304-34520-2
- Orel, Vladimir (2003). A Handbook of Germanic Etymology. Brill. ISBN 9004128751
- Schulz, Katja (2019). "Walküren" in Zernack, Julia; Schulz, Katja (2019) Gylfis Täuschung. Rezeptionsgeschichtliches Lexikon zur nordischen Mythologie und Heldensage. Universitätsverlag Winter, Heidelberg 2019, ISBN 978-3-8253-6874-6, p. 717-740.
- Simek, Rudolf (2007) translated by Angela Hall. Dictionary of Northern Mythology. D.S. Brewer ISBN 0-85991-513-1
- Wessén, Elias; Sven B.F. Jansson (1953–58). Sveriges runinskrifter: IX. Upplands runinskrifter del 4. Stockholm: Kungl. Vitterhets Historie och Antikvitets Akademien. ISSN 0562-8016 (in Swedish)
