= Hervör alvitr =

Valkyrie

In Norse mythology, Hervör alvitr (Old Norse, alvitr possibly meaning "all-wise" or "strange creature") is a valkyrie. Hervör alvitr is attested in the Poetic Edda poem Völundarkviða as the sister of the valkyrie Hlaðguðr svanhvít (both daughters of King Hlödvér), and as the seven-year wife of the smith Völundr.
