= Hariasa =

Germanic goddess

Hariasa is a Germanic goddess. Hariasa is attested on a (now lost) stone bearing a Latin dedication to her. The stone was found in Cologne, Germany and dated to 187 CE (CIL XIII 8185).

== Etymology ==
Rudolf Simek says that like the Old Norse valkyrie name Herja, Hariasa derives from the Proto-Germanic word *Herjaza and that both may refer to goddess of war, although an independent development among the North Germanic peoples and West Germanic peoples is possible. Alternately, the name Hariasa may mean "goddess with much hair."
