= Skögul and Geirskögul =

Valkyries in Norse mythology

In Norse mythology, Skögul (Old Norse: Skǫgul, "shaker" or possibly "high-towering") and Geirskögul (Old Norse: Geirskǫgul, "spear-skögul") are valkyries who alternately appear as separate or individual figures. Both valkyries appear in Heimskringla where they seem to be the same being, and are otherwise listed separately in the valkyrie lists in the Poetic Edda poems Völuspá and Grímnismál, the longer of the two valkyrie lists in Skáldskaparmál yet Skögul appears alone in the shorter of the two. Skögul appears in kennings but Geirskögul does not.

== Attestations ==
=== Heimskringla ===
In Hákonarmál, Odin sends forth the two valkyries Göndul and Skögul to "choose among the kings' kinsmen" and decide who in battle should dwell with Odin in Valhalla. A battle rages with great slaughter, and part of the description employs the kenning "Skögul's-stormblast" for "battle". Haakon and his men die in battle, and they see the valkyrie Göndul leaning on a spear shaft. Göndul comments that "groweth now the gods' following, since Hákon has been with host so goodly bidden home with holy godheads." Haakon hears "what the valkyries said," and the valkyries are described as sitting "high-hearted on horseback," wearing helmets, carrying shields and that the horses wisely bore them. A brief exchange follows between Haakon and the valkyrie Skögul:

Hákon said:
"Why didst Geirskogul grudge us victory?
though worthy we were for the gods to grant it?"
Skogul said:
"'Tis owing to us that the issue was won
and your foemen fled."

Skögul says that they shall now ride forth to the "green homes of the godheads" to tell Odin the king will come to Valhalla. The poem continues, and Haakon becomes a part of the Einherjar in Valhalla, awaiting to do battle with the monstrous wolf Fenrir.

=== Kennings ===
The name Skögul is common as a valkyrie name in kennings. Examples include:

borð Sköglar "board of Skögul" (shield)
dynr Sköglar "din of Skögul" (battle, e.g. in Glymdrápa)
eldr Sköglar "fire of Skögul" (sword)
gagl Sköglar "gosling of Skögul" (raven)
kápa Sköglar "cape of Skögul" (byrnie)
veðr Sköglar "wind of Skögul" (battle, e.g. in Hákonarmál)

The name Geirskögul does not appear in kennings, perhaps because trisyllabic names are somewhat difficult to handle in the dróttkvætt meter.

== Theories ==
According to Hilda Ellis Davidson, if Skögul means "high-towering", the name "might be a reference to the gigantic size of these beings."
