= Svipul =

Valkyrie from Norse Myths

In Norse mythology, Svipul (Old Norse "changeable") is a valkyrie. Svipul is attested among valkyrie list in the poem Darraðarljóð and the longer of the two Nafnaþulur valkyrie lists in the Poetic Edda book Skáldskaparmál. In addition, the name Svipul appears as a synonym for "battle" in Skáldskaparmál. Rudolf Simek theorizes that the name Svipul presumably refers to the changeable nature of fate, whose directors the valkyries are represented as being, especially in Darraðarljóð.
