= Hlaðguðr svanhvít =

Valkyrie

In Norse mythology, Hlaðguðr svanhvít (Old Norse Hlaðguðr "swan-white") is a valkyrie. Hlaðguðr svanhvít is attested in the Poetic Edda poem Völundarkviða as the sister of the valkyrie Hervör alvitr (both daughters of King Hlödvér), and as the seven-year wife of Slagfiðr.

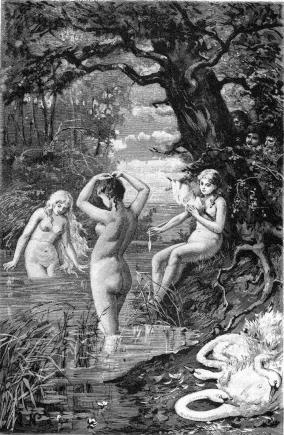
Valkyries with swan skins
