= Hildr =

Norse mythical character (valkyrie)

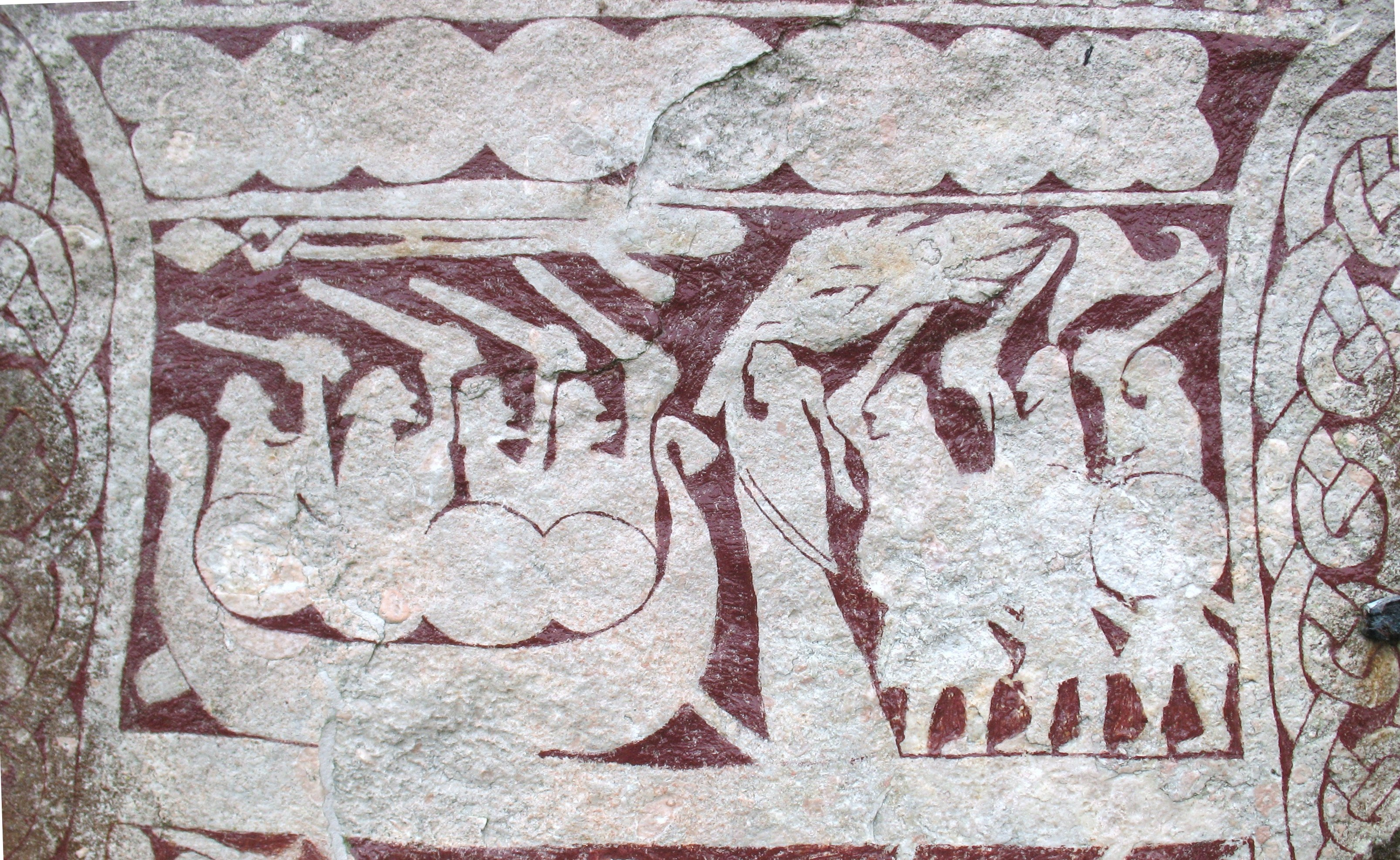
A detail from the Stora Hammars I stone, a picture stone on Gotland.

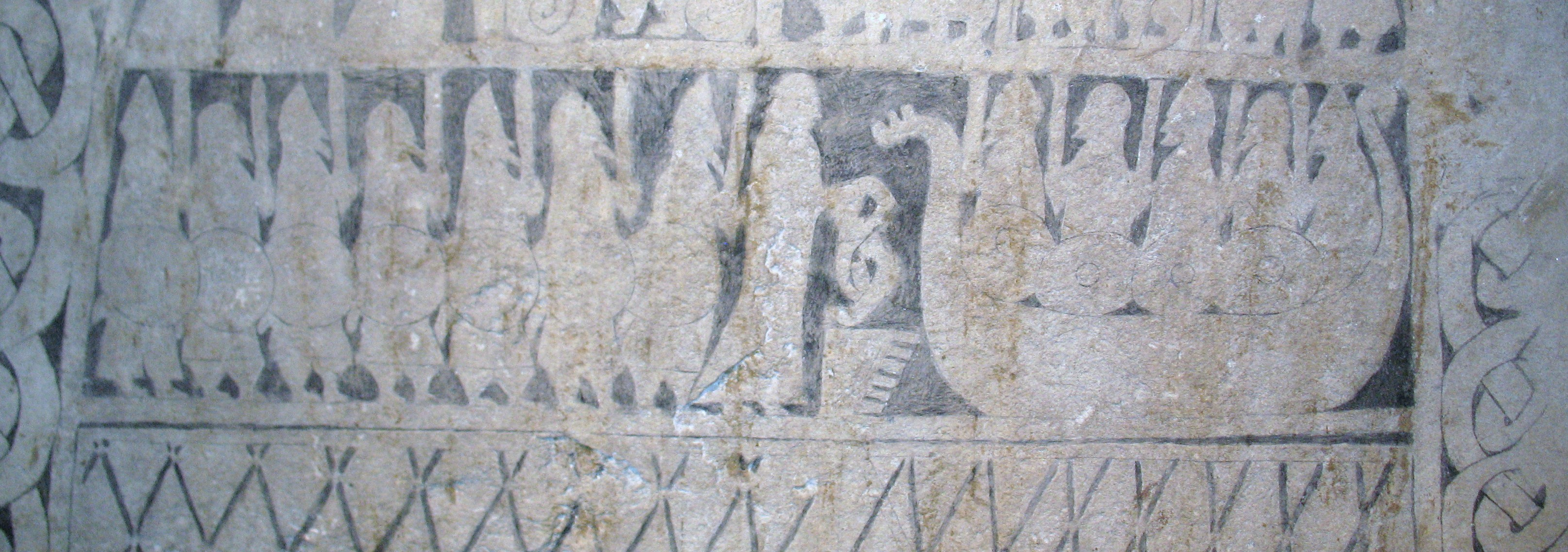
A detail from the Smiss (I) stone, an image stone on Gotland.

In Norse mythology, Hildr (Old Norse "battle") is a valkyrie. Hildr is attested in the Prose Edda as Högni's daughter and Hedin's wife in the Hjaðningavíg. She had the power to revive the dead in battlefields and used it to maintain the everlasting battle between Hedin and Högni.

Hildr is also mentioned along with other valkyries in Völuspá, Darraðarljóð and other Old Norse poems. The Old Norse word hildr is a common noun meaning "battle" and it is not always clear when the poets had the valkyrie in mind, as a personification of battle.

== General and cited references ==
- Brodeur, Arthur Gilchrist (transl.) (1916). The Prose Edda by Snorri Sturluson. New York: The American-Scandinavian Foundation. Available online at Google Books.
- Jónsson, Finnur (1931). Lexicon Poeticum. S. L. Møllers Bogtrykkeri, København.
- Orchard, Andy (1997). Dictionary of Norse Myth and Legend. Cassell. ISBN 0-304-34520-2
