= List of figures in Germanic heroic legend, B–C =

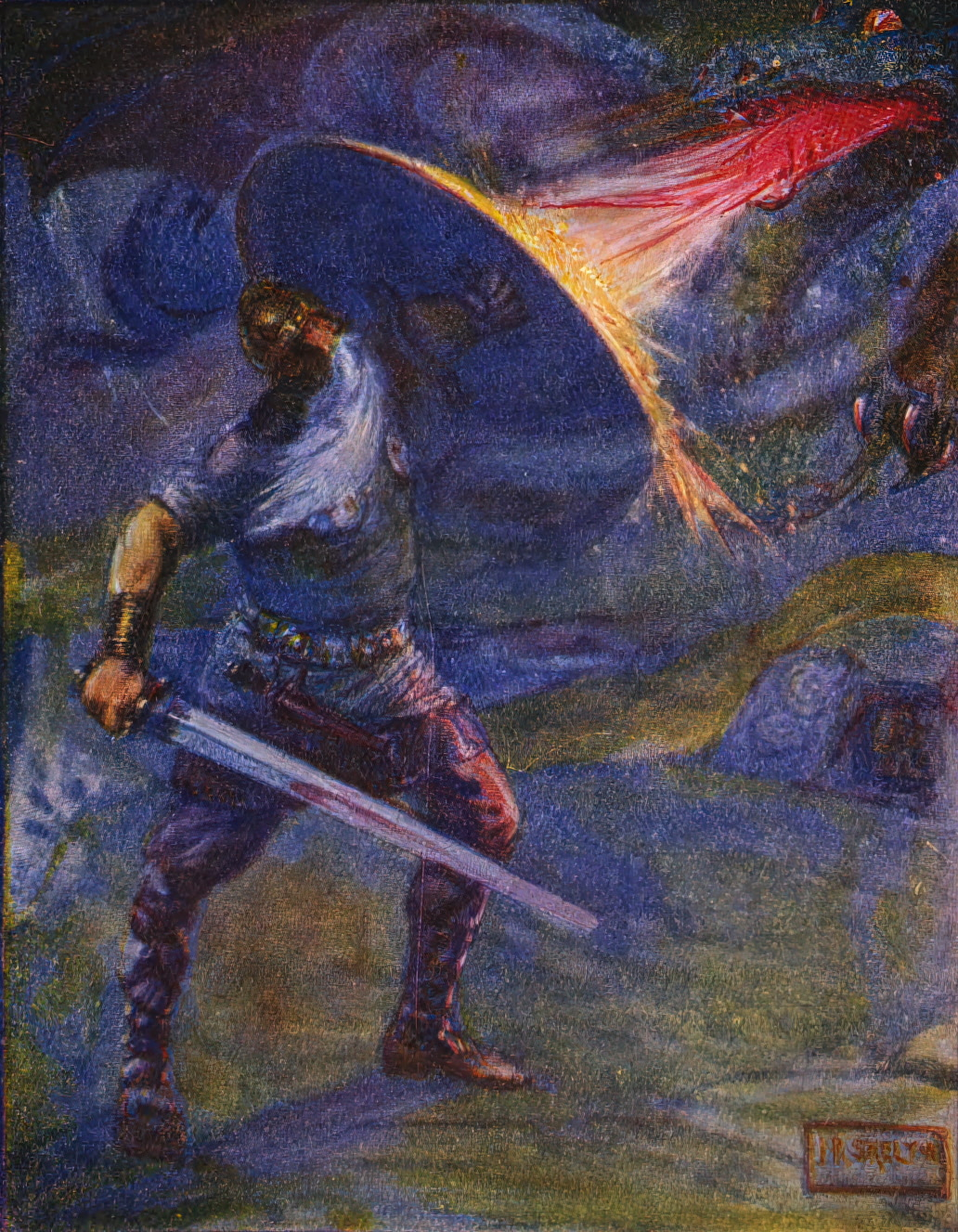
Beowulf fighting the dragon.

== B ==
Figure	Names in medieval languages	Historical origin	Name meaning	Relationships	Early and English Attestations	Norse Attestations	German Attestations
Baldung	Middle High German: Baldunc		From PGmc *balda ("brave, strong").	A dwarf: Dietrich von Bern saves him from a wild man and in return Baldung gives him a magical jewel that protects against hunger, thirst, and snakes.			Sigenot
Baltram^{1}	Middle High German: Baltram, Old Norse: Boltram		From PGmc *balda ("brave, strong"), and OHG hraban ("raven"), from PGmc *χrabnaz ("raven").	One of Attila's vassals, in the German legends he aids Dietrich in his fight against Ermanarich and fights Volker at Raben (Ravenna). In the Þiðreks saga, he is lord of Fenedi (Venice), brother of Reginbaldr and Hildebrand^{1}'s uncle. Hildebrand^{1} uses his name in his first encounter with Vithga (Widege).			Þiðreks saga, Dietrichs Flucht, Rabenschlacht
Baltram^{2} von Bulgarien	Middle High German: Baltram von Bulgarîe		See Baltram^{1}	In Wolfdietrich A and k, the brother-in-law of Berchtung. He defends Berchtung against the accusation that he has murdered the infant Wolfdietrich.			Wolfdietrich
Bauge	Middle High German: Bouge		The name comes from PGmc *bauga ("bracelet, armlet, ring").	Wolfdietrich's brother; together with Wolfdietrich's other brother Wachsmut, he attempts to deprive Wolfdietrich of his father's inheritance.			Wolfdietrich
Bauggerd	Old Norse: Bauggerðr		Baug- means "armlet, ring", while gerðr is derived from garðr, a fenced-in area.	See Grímr, Eygrímr			
Beadohild	Old English: Bēadohild, Old Norse: Bǫðvildr		First element PGmc *badu- ("battle"), second element, PGmc *hildjō- ("strife, conflict").	Daughter of King Nithhad. She is raped by Wayland the Smith while he is held in captivity by the king. She is the mother of Witige.	Deor	Völundarkviða	Þiðreks saga (unnamed).
Beadeca	Old English: Beadeca	Perhaps based on the Ostrogothic king Totila (Baduila).	As in Baduila, the first element is the Germanic badu- ("battle"). The second element -ca is a diminutive suffix synonymous with -ila.	Mentioned in line 112 in Widsith, where he is a Gothic hero.	Widsith		
Beanstan	Old English: Bēanstān		The first element bēan may mean "shark", cf. Icelandic bauni, or it may mean "legume". The second element means "stone", from PGmc *stainaz .	The father of Breca of the Brondings, mentioned in Beowulf, line 524.	Beowulf		
Becca^{1}				Ermanaric's counselor, see Sibeche (Bikki)			
Becca^{2}				See Berchtung below.			
Beigaðr	Old Norse: Beigaðr, Old Norse: Beiguðr		Beigr means "fear" and Beiguðr means "an athlete, one who inspires fear(?)", while Beigaðr means "terrifier".	In Skáldskaparmál, Beiguðr is one of the twelve berserkers sent by Hrólfr kraki to help the Swedish king Aðils (Eadgils) in the Battle on the Ice of Lake Vänern. Hvítserkr^{1} and Svipdag are also mentioned among the champions but only Svipdag as his brother. In Hrólfs saga kraka, Beigaðr is the brother of Svipdag and Hvítserkr^{1} and when Hrólfr Kraki and his champions escape the Swedish king with the stolen gold over the Fýrisvellir, it is Beigaðr who is carrying the horn full of gold before Hrólfr takes it and spreads the gold after them. In the saga, he and his brothers also take part in Hrólf's last battle. A warrior named Beigaðr also appears among the participants of the Battle of Brávellir in Sögubrot and Gesta Danorum.		Hrólfs saga kraka, Skáldskaparmál, Sögubrot, Gesta Danorum, Tóka þáttr Tókasonar (mentioned)	
Beiti	Old Norse: Beiti		The name appears as the name of a sea-king in the sense "who steers against the wind", but in this case it may be based on the meaning "pasturage".	In the eddic poem Atlamál, the steward of Atli (Attila) who suggests that instead of cutting out the heart of the brave hero Högni^{2}, they cut out the heart of the useless thrall Hjalli.		Atlamál	
Bekkhild	Old Norse: Bekkhildr		Bekk means "bench" (as in a Viking lord's hall) and hildr meant "battle" in poetry and was used in female names.	In Völsunga saga, Bekkhild is Brynhild's sister and married to Brynhild's foster-father Heimir^{2}, with whom she has the son Alsvid. While Brynhild had taken up weapons, Bekkhild had learnt feminine skills.		Völsunga saga (24)	
Beow(ulf), Beowa	Old English: Bēow or Bēaw, Old Norse: Bjárr or Byggvir		The name means "grain", "barley" or "harvest".	In the epic poem Beowulf, Beo(wulf) is the son of Scyld, the founder of the Scylding dynasty, and the father of Healfdene (and thus the grandfather of Hrothgar). In the manuscript he appears as Beowulf, but scholars generally agree that it is a misspelling of Beow. However, publishers of scholarly editions tend not to correct it. He is also mentioned as Beaw/Beo together with Scef/Sceafa and Scyld/Sceldwa, as a Danish ancestor for the West Saxon royal dynasty in three chronicles. A Beaf appears in ON Langfeðatal and in the prologue to the Prose Edda, but this is a borrowing from Anglo-Saxon sources. The name corresponds to ON Byggvir, who was one of the Norse god Freyr's servants in Lokasenna.	Beowulf (lines 18 and 53), The Anglo-Saxon Chronicle (A.D. 855), Asser's Life of King Alfred (892) and Æthelweard's Chronicon (855.3)	Langfeðatal, Prose Edda, Lokasenna	
Beowulf	Old English: Bēowulf	Probably not a historical person.	Various proposed etymologies, Wilhelm Grimm proposed a compound "bee-wolf" meaning "bear".	Beowulf's father was Ecgþeow who probably belonged to the ruling Swedish Scylfing dynasty, and his mother was the only daughter of the Geatish king Hreðel. The Geatish king was his foster-father from the age of seven. He has a warm relationship with his maternal uncle Hygelac. During Hygelac's historic raid into Frisia, Hygelac is killed and Beowulf avenges him by crushing Dæghrefn to death with his bare hands. As the Danish king Hrothgar and his warriors cower in fear every night for Grendel, Beowulf arrives at the Danish court and liberates them from both Grendel and Grendel's mother. Hygelac's successor Heardred offers sanctuary to the renegade Swedish princes Eadgils (Aðils) and Eanmund after their uncle Onela (Áli) becomes the king of Sweden. This incurs the wrath of Onela who attacks the Geats and both Heardred and Eanmund are killed. Onela leaves Beowulf as the king of the Geats, who however avenges Heardred by supporting Eadgils in the Battle on the Ice. He has to kill a dragon as an old man and dies in the process.	Beowulf	Possibly the same figure as Böðvarr Bjarki.	
Bera^{1}	Old Norse: Bera, Latin: Ursa		ON for "she-bear".	Bera was a queen of Sweden, whose husband Alfr^{1} ruled together with his brother Yngvi^{1}, who often was away pillaging. She was beautiful, impressive and cheerful and Alfr was timid and sullen. Bera preferred the manly and outgoing Yngve and she did not hide it. One evening when Alfr saw Yngvi^{1} converse with Bera, he unexpectedly pulled his sword and killed his brother with it, but before dying, Yngvi^{1} did the same with Alfr.		Ynglingatal, Ynglinga saga, Historia Norwegiæ	
Bera^{2}	Old Norse: Bera		See Bera^{1}	A freeholder's daughter and the lover of Björn^{1}. Björn's father king Hring had captured a Saami princess who wanted to seduce him, but Björn spurned her advances and she turned him into a bear. Bera is forced by Hvit to eat some of Björn's flesh, and after that she bears three children for him who are born after he has been killed, Bödvar Bjarki, Elk-Frodi and Thorir. Later, she tells her Bödvar and Hring of what had happened, and shows them Björn's ring as proof. She marries the jarl Valsleyt. In Bjarkarímur, her name has been changed to Hildr.		Hrólfs saga kraka, Bjarkarímur	
Berchtung von Meran	Middle High German: Berhtunc von Mêrân, Old English: Becca	Possibly has a historical analogue in the dynastic politics of Merovingians; his role is reminiscent of the office of the mayor of the palace.	From PGmc *berhta ("bright, shining"), a form almost exclusive to West Germanic and typically Frankish. Becca is a hypocoristic form of Berht.	Hugdietrich's majordomo. He raises, protects, and supports the young Wolfdietrich.	Widsith		Wolfdietrich
Berig		The Gothic legend of a migration of a smaller group of settlers from Scandinavia under king Berig finds support in archaeological remains from the 1st c. in Eastern Pomerania and in comparative studies of similar elite conquests.	From PGmc *bera ("bear").	According to a Gothic legend told by Jordanes, he brought his people on three ships from Scandinavia and settled in Gothiscandza, in what is today northern Poland.	Getica		
Berta	Old Norse: Berta, Middle High German: Berte	The name is shared by the mother, sister, and daughter of Charlemagne, as well as the sister-in-law of Rother in the minstrel epic König Rother, a similar story of abduction to that in the Þiðreks saga. In Rother Berte is the wife of Pippin and mother of Charlemagne.	From PGmc *berhta ("bright").	The daughter of king Oserich (Osantrix) and sister of Helche (Erka). She is abducted with her sister by Duke Rotholf, who marries her.			Þiðreks saga
Bikki				Ermanaric's counselor, see Sibeche (Bikki)			
Billing	Old English: Billing	Probably historical.	The name may be derived from bill, a type of sword.	Mentioned in line 25 in Widsith, where he is the king of the Werns. In Norse mythology, the name is attested both for a dwarf and a giant.	Widsith		
Billung	Middle High German: Billunc		Based on Gmc *bil ("miraculous power"), but as a common noun MHG billunc means "spite, spiteful person," probably based on the character of dwarfs.	A dwarf who abducts Wolfdietrich's wife Liebgart and is killed by Wolfdietrich.			Wolfdietrich
Biterolf von Steier	Middle High German: Biterolf von Stîre, Old Norse: Biturulfr		Possibly an alteration of an earlier *Patirolf, first element *badu- ("battle"), second element *-wolf ("wolf"). Originally a nickname meaning "tyrant, choleric person."	The father of Dietleib von Steier. According to Biterolf und Dietleib, he is originally from Toledo, Spain. He goes to serve Attila at his court, at one point going incognito under the name Fruote (see Fróði) and fighting against his son Dietleib. As a reward for his services, Attila grants him Styria as a fief. In Þiðreks saga, he is instead the king of Scania.			Biterolf und Dietleib, Þiðreks saga, Dietrichs Flucht, Virginal
Bjalki	Old Norse: Bjálki		Bjálki means "balk" or "beam".	A warrior at Hrólfr kraki's court. When the Swedish champion Svipdag arrives at the court, he is told to sit beside him, and Bjalki informs him of the space reserved on the benches for Hrólf's champions.		Hrólfs saga kraka	
Bjarmar	Old Norse: Bjarmarr, Old Norse: Bjartmarr		Bjarm- means "radiance of light", while the second element -arr can have three different origins: *-harjaʀ ("war chief, warrior"), *-warjaʀ ("defender") or *-ʒaiʀaʀ ("spear"). Bjart- means "bright", while -marr means "excellent", "commendable".	According to the U version of Hervarar saga, the Swedish colonial ruler of Aldeigjuborg, on Lake Ladoga. After Hjörvard^{1} had challenged Hjalmar to a duel on Samsø for the hand of the Swedish princess Ingeborg, at Uppsala, the twelve brothers go to Bjarmarr, for a feast, and Angantýr marries Bjarmar's daughter Sváfa there.		Hervarar saga	
Björn	Old Norse: Bjǫrn		From PN *bernuz meaning "bear".	The father of Bodvar Bjarki and the son of the Norwegian king Hringr. He is cursed to become a bear at night when he refuses the sexual advances of Hringr's wife Hvit. He fathers three children with the woman Bera and then is killed by the king's hunters.		Hrólfs saga kraka	
Björn Eriksson	Old Norse: Bjǫrn Eiríksson		See Björn.	Björn was the son of king Eric Anundsson/Emundarsson and the father of Eric the Victorious and Olof Björnsson, who ruled together. According to Hervarar saga he ruled for a long time and Snorri Sturluson, in Haralds saga Hárfagra ch. 29, says that he ruled for 50 years.		Hervarar saga, Haralds saga Hárfagra, Óláfs saga ins helga	
Björn at Haugi	Old Norse: Bjǫrn at Haugi	As has been generally assumed, he may be the historic king Björn (Bernus) who invited Ansgar in 829 to spread Christianity in Sweden.	See Björn.	The Hervarar saga tells that Björn and his brother Anund of Uppsala were the sons of Refil, who was the son of Björn Ironside, the son of Ragnar Lodbrok. They divided the Swedish kingdom between themselves when their uncle Eric died. He settled near a Barrow and was called Björn at the Barrow. Björn and Anund were succeeded by Anund's son Eric. The Prose Edda, Hervarar saga and Egils saga Skalla-Grímssonar tell that he was a patron of the skald Bragi Boddason. He is also mentioned in Landnámabók, where Thord Knapp, an early Swedish settler on Iceland was the son of Björn at Haugi's sister. Thormod the Strong, another Swedish settler, had been exiled by king Björn for manslaughter. In Sweden, there appears to have been an independent living tradition of a king Björn who had lived at "the Barrow" (Håga mound) near Uppsala, and he is today intrinsically connected with the Barrow in both scholarly and public perception.		Hervarar saga, Landnámabók, Prose Edda, Egils saga Skalla-Grímssonar	
Björn Ironside	Old Norse: Bjǫrn Járnsíða, Latin: Biorno ferreus latus, Latin: Biornus ferrei lateris	A historical Viking named Berno who was active around the Seine c. 850.	See Björn^{1}.	In Ragnars saga loðbrókar, the second son of Ragnar Lodbrok and Aslaug^{1} after Ivar the Boneless and before Hvitserk and Rognvald, and Sigurd Snake-in-the-Eye. He goes with his brothers to attack Hvítabœr and its dangerous bulls that were strengthened through sacrifices, and he takes part in his brothers' expedition to Sweden to avenge their half-brothers Agnar^{4} and Eric^{3}, where there is an even more dangerous cow, Sibilja. According to Norna-Gests þáttr it is Norna-Gest himself who lies to Björn about how long it is to Rome, and makes the Viking army turn back when it had reached Luna. Björn also takes part in the invasion of England to avenge their father Ragnar. In Ragnarssona Þáttr and Ad catalogum, the same family relations are mentioned, and in the first source, he also takes part in the expedition to Sweden. In Ragnars saga loðbrókar, he is said to have a kingdom, and in Ragnarssona Þáttr this is specified as Sweden and the territories subjected to it. Hervarar saga tells of his descendants on the Swedish throne until king Philip in the early 12th c. In Gesta Danorum (IX), he is Ragnar's son by Thora and the brother of Rathbarthus, Dunwatus, Sywardus (Sigurd Snake-in-the-Eye), Agnerus^{4} and Ivarus (Ivar the Boneless).	Annales Bertiniani, Chronicon Fontanellense, Gesta Normannorum Ducum	Ragnars saga loðbrókar, Ad catalogum regum Sveciæ annotanda, Ragnarssona Þáttr, Gesta Danorum (IX), Hervarar saga, Norna-Gests þáttr	
Blaeja	Old Norse: Blæja		The name means "dark blue" and may be a borrowing of Old English bleoh.	She was the daughter of the English king Ælla and married Sigurd Snake-in-the-Eye with whom she had son Horda-Knut, and his twin sister Aslaug^{2}.		Ragnarssona þáttr	
Bleda	Middle High German: Blœdel(în), Old Norse: Bloðlin	Bleda, brother of Attila, died c. 445.	Probably of Hunnish origin. Alternatively, Bleda may be a short form of Germanic names such as OHG Bladardus, however Kaufmann writes that blad- is only a Romanized form of balda- ("brave").	The brother of Attila. In the Nibelungenlied, Kriemhild encourages him to attack the Burgundians by promising him the hand of Nuodung's widow. He is killed by Dankwart. Elsewhere, he appears among Dietrich von Bern's men. In Þiðreks saga, he is one of Attila's leaders and is killed by Gernot.		An unnamed brother of Atli is killed in Atlamál.	Nibelungenlied, Þiðreks saga, Dietrichs Flucht, Rabenschlacht
Blind	Old Norse: Blindr		The name means "blind", or in the context "the blinding, deceiving one".	Blind was a typical name of an evil counsellor in Scandinavian legends. When Helgi had spied in the hall of Hunding, he revealed himself on purpose to Hunding's son Heming by telling a shepherd that he was the man they had thought was Hamal, Hagal's son. Helgi was Hamal's foster-son, so Hunding sent a search party to Hamal led by his evil counsellor Blind. Helgi disguised himself as a female thrall and started grinding the quern. When Blind saw him, he commented that the thrall woman had hard eyes. Hagal answered him that the woman was a Valkyrie and a sister of Sigar and Högni that Helgi had taken captive. Helgi escaped, got on a warship and killed Hunding.		Helgakviða Hundingsbana II	
Bödvar Bjarki	Old Norse: Böðvarr Bjarki, Latin: Biarco or Bodvarus		"Warlike Little-Bear"	According to Hrólfs saga kraka, he is the son of Björn, and the grandson of king Hringr of Oppland. He avenges his father by killing his father's step-mother, the sami princess Hvít, who had turned his father into a bear after spurning her advances. After inheriting the kingdom, he stays for a while with his brother Thorir who had become king of the Geats, but goes to serve Hrolfr Kraki instead. On his way, he promises a couple to look after their son Hött, who serves Hrolfr kraki, but who is being bullied by the other warriors. When he arrives, Bödvar kills some of the bullies. However, the Danes are in great fear because they are terrorized by a troll. During the Yule celebrations, the troll arrives, and the Danes hide in fear in the hall. Bödvar goes out with Hött and kills the troll, makes Hött eat its heart and drink of the blood to get braver, and afterwards he makes it look like it was Hött who killed the troll. After this Hött is called Hjalti. Bödvar serves king Hrólfr until he falls together with him in battle. An almost identical account of the hero killing a beast that terrorizes the Danish court appears in Gesta Danorum, both being based on the heroic poem Bjarkamál.	Possibly the same figure as Beowulf.	Hrólfs saga kraka, Latin epitome of Skjöldunga saga, Gesta Danorum, Bjarkamál, Bjarkarímur	
Bolfriana	Old Norse: Bolfriana		Förstemann connects the first element Bol- to OE bealo and ON bǫl, from PGmc *balwan ("malice", "misfortune").	Bolfriana is initially the wife of Áki Aurlungatrausti (see Hache). She has an affair with Earl Iron, causing her husband to kill him. After Áki's death, Dietrich arranges for her to be married to Vithga (Widege), causing him to cease to be a vassal of Dietrich and to become a vassal of Ermanaric.			Þiðreks saga
Borgar	Old Norse: Borgarr, Latin: Burgar		The first element is PGmc *-berʒō or *-burʒō ("helper", "assistant"), and the second element -arr, can have three different origins: *-harjaʀ ("war chief, warrior"), *-warjaʀ ("defender") or *-ʒaiʀaʀ ("spear").	He appears at the massive Battle of Brávellir as one of the Danish king Harald Wartooth's warriors. Gesta Danorum tells that he came from the Danish royal seat Lejre together with Beigaðr, Belgi, Hort, Barri and Toli. Sögubrot adds that he gave Starkad a hard fight, but eventually Starkad defeated him. A Borgar is also listed on the Swedish side in Gesta Danorum, cf. Ubbi of Friesland that Saxo, the author of Gesta Danorum, mentions on both sides.		Sögubrot, Gesta Danorum (VIII)	
Borghild^{1}	Old Norse: Borghildr, Old Norse: Ingibjǫrg		From ON borg ("protection") and hildr ("battle").	In Helgakviða Hundingsbana I and Helgakviða Hundingsbana II, she is the wife of Sigmund and the mother of Helgi Hundingsbane and they live in Brálund. In Frá dauða Sinfjǫtla, Sigmund is a Frank but stays with Borghild^{1} in Denmark, where they have the son Hámund beside Helgi, and Sigmund's son Sinfjötli. The latter had wanted the same woman was Borghild^{1}'s brother and killed him. Although Borghild^{1} must accept wergild from her stepson, she offers him two horns of poisoned ale that he refused to drink so Sigmund drank them instead. The third horn Sinfjötli drinks, and he dies. Sigmund stays for some time with Borghild^{1}, but later returns to his own kingdom Frankland where he marries Hjördís. The Völsunga saga, tells the same story, but Borghild^{1}'s geographic origin is not stated and after her killing Sinfjötli Sigmund divorces her, and she soon dies.		Helgakviða Hundingsbana I, Helgakviða Hundingsbana II, Frá dauða Sinfjǫtla, Völsunga saga, Norna-Gests þáttr	
Borghild^{2}/Ingebjorg^{2}	Old Norse: Borghildr		See Borghild^{1}	In Ragnarssona þáttr, the daughter of Ragnar Lodbrok's viceroy in Sweden, Eysteinn Beli. Ragnar's sons Agnar^{4} and Eric^{3} arrived and declared that Eric^{3} would take over and marry Borghild^{2}. When the Swedes opposed this, they met Eric and Agnar in battle after which Agnar died and Eric was taken prisoner. Eysteinn offered him safe conduct and the hand of his daughter but Eric only wanted to be lifted and left to die on raised spears, which was granted. Eric and Agnar's half-brothers Sigurd Snake-in-the-Eye, Björn Ironside, Hvitserk^{2}, Ivar the Boneless and their mother Aslaug^{1} attack Sweden and kill Eysteinn. In Ragnars saga loðbrókar, named Ingebjorg^{2}. The two brothers attacked after their father had cancelled his engagement with Eystein's daughter and the latter had ended the friendship. Agnar and Eric were not only met by the full force of the Swedish army, the king also let loose his sacred cow, Sibilja, which wreaked havoc on their army, and Agnar fell while Eric was captured. Eric was offered the hand of Eysteinn's daughter but the ending is the same, after which Ivar the Boneless attack in revenge killing every living thing until they had slain Eysteinn. Krákumál specifies the location of his death as Ulleråker.		Ragnars saga loðbrókar, Ragnarssona þáttr	
Borgny	Old Norse: Borgnýr	Appears to be an invention of the poet.	The first element is PGmc *-berʒō or *-burʒō ("helper", "assistant"), and the second element from ON nýr ("new").	In the eddic poem Oddrúnargrátr, the daughter of Heidrek^{2}, one of the vassals of Atli (Attila). She is in labour and needs the assistance of Oddrun, Attila's sister, who by using magic helps her give birth to a boy and a girl. The father is one of Atilla's warriors, Vilmund, who is revealed by the poem to be the one who killed Högni (by cutting out his heart).		Oddrúnargrátr	
Bóvi	Old Norse: Bóvi or Old Norse: Bófi	The name is an Icelandic adaptation of the East Norse Bove instead of the expected West Norse Búi, which indicates that he was historical person.	The name means a "fat and clumpsy person".	The Geatish foster-father of the Swedish king Ingjald's son Olof Trätälja, and who lived in Västergötland. He was also the father of Saxi fletti, and he had previously been the foster-father of Olof's mother, the Swedish queen Gauthild.		Ynglinga saga, Af Uplendinga konungum	
Bragi	Old Norse: Bragi		The name is cognate with Old English Brego ("prince") and is derived from bragr ("foremost").	In Eddic poem Helgakvíða Hundingsbana II, Bragi was the son of Högni^{3} and the brother of Sigrún and Dag. He fell in battle against Helgi Hundingsbane.		Helgakvíða Hundingsbana II	
Brai	Old Norse: Brái		The name means "the one with the brow", from brá ("brow").	He appears at the massive Battle of Brávellir as one of the Danish king Harald Wartooth's warriors, and is called the "father of Sækalf". The Shield-maiden Visna, who was holding the Danish banner, challenged Starkad telling him that he was a giant (troll) who was about to go to Hel. Calling him so was not only an insult but also a correct statement, because that is what he was in the Norse legendary tradition. Starkad answered her that she would first drop the Danish banner on the ground, and cut off her left hand that held the banner. This caused Brai to attack Starkad wanting to avenge the shield-maiden, but Starkad pushed his sword right through him, adding Brai to the piles of corpses on the battle field of Bråvalla.		Sögubrot	
Breca	Old English: Breca, Breoca		The name Breca may mean "rush" or "storm", or it means "breaker" from PGmc *brekōn (from *brekanan, "to break"), cf. OE wiðer-breca ("adversary") ON breki ("breaker") and OHG hūs-brehho ("burglar").	A legendary chieftain of the Brondings mentioned both in Beowulf and Widsith. Unferth asks Beowulf about a swimming competition that he has had with Breca.	Beowulf, Widsith		
Bredi	Old Norse: Breði	His name is derived from "snowdrift" and master's name is Skadi (Skaði means "ski", "snowshoe"), who was also a goddess/giantess, so it has been suggested that the account of Breði is based on a lost Norse myth.	The name is derived from breðafǫnn ("snowdrift"). It was common in the 13th c. to explain words this way.	Bredi was a very able thrall, even more able than some men who were higher in station that he was, who had a master named Skadi. However, Bredi accompanied Odin's son Sigi on a deer hunting trip and when they collected the deer Bredi had killed both more and bigger deer than Sigi. The latter was so upset by being outdone by a lesser man than him that he murdered the thrall and hid him in a snowdrift, after which he claimed that Bredi had disappeared. Skadi did not believe him and after a search they found Bredi in the snow. Sigi was banished for the murder.		Völsunga saga	
Brunhild	Old Norse: Brynhildr, Middle High German: Brünhilt	Disputed: Brunhilda of Austrasia or ahistorical.	"Armor-battle", from the equivalents of OHG brunia ("armor, byrnie") and hiltia ("conflict").	The wife of Gunther/Gunnar. In the Norse tradition, a valkyrie, daughter of Buðli^{1}, brother of Attila and lover of Sigurd. In the German tradition, she is a powerful Amazonian queen. In both traditions, Gunther/Gunnar requires Sigurd/Siegfried's help in order to marry Brunhild. Brunhild's anger once she has learned this causes her to agitate for Sigurd/Siegfried's death. In the Norse tradition, she kills herself after this, but in the German tradition she is simply not mentioned afterwards. She also plays a very minor role in several other German epics.		Grípisspá, Brot af Sigurðarkviðu, Guðrúnarkviða I, Guðrúnarkviða II, Helreið Brynhildar, Skáldskaparmál, Völsunga saga, Norna-Gests þáttr	Nibelungenlied, Þiðreks saga, Biterolf und Dietleib, Rosengarten zu Worms.
Bruni	Old Norse: Brúni		The name Brúni means "shiny brown".	In the massive Battle of Brávellir, Bruni serves as the Danish king Harald Wartooth's commander-in-chief in the battle against the Swedish king Sigurd Ring. He is described as the wisest man in the army. Bruni tells Harald that Sigurd has positioned his army in flying wedge (Svinfylking) formation, which disheartens his king because only the god Odin could have informed the Swedish king about the tactic. After a massive loss of lives, the battle ended when Bruni took a club and crushed his king's head. The Gesta Danorum also makes Bruni the driver of Harald's chariot, and identifies Bruni with Odin, something that is not stated in the other source, the Icelandic Sögubrot. Wikander has pointed out many similarities between the Danish account and the Kurukshetra War in Mahabharata, and Bruni corresponds in several ways to the Indic character Bhima, suggesting ancient common origins in Proto-Indo-European culture.		Sögubrot, Gesta Danorum (VIII)	
Brunstein	Old Norse: Brunsteinn		Probably from the attested Middle Low German name Brûnstên. The first element is either from PGmc *brunja ("armor, byrnie") or *brûn ("brown"); the second element is PGmc *staina ("stone").	The brother of earl Rodgeir, he is killed by Samson.			Þiðreks saga
Buðli^{1}	Old Norse: Buðli or Old Norse: Osið (Þiðreks saga), Middle High German: Botelunc, Latin: Buthlus (Gesta Danorum)	Probably a reflection of Bleda, Attila's brother.	Possibly from, or adapted to, PGmc *buð- ("to offer"), and may be based on Visigothic Balt dynasty, to which Brunhilda of Austrasia belonged.	The father of Attila. In Norse tradition, also the father of Brunhild. In Wolfdietrich, brother-in-law of Hugdietrich. In Ásmundar saga kappabana, grandfather of Hildebrand^{1} and Asmund. In Gesta Danorum, he is the uncle of Ermanaric. In the Þiðreks saga he is a Frisian and called Osid, a name not found in any other sources.		Völsunga saga, and widely mentioned as Atli's father.	Widely mentioned as Etzel's father.
Buðli^{2}	Old Norse: Buðli		See Buðli^{1}.	He was a powerful king of Sweden whose wife died, but who had a daughter named Hildr^{2}. Two dwarven smiths arrived named Olíus and Alíus, and he challenged them to make objects, first a knife, then a ring, and they both impressed him. Then he ordered them to make two swords, to which they reluctantly agreed. When he tested their swords, Olíus' sword broke so he ordered him to make a new one. The dwarf returned with a new sword that was the best one so far. The king asked if there were any disadvantages and the dwarf answered that he had cursed it so that it would cause the death of two noble brothers, the king's daughter's sons. In anger the king struck at him, but the dwarves disappeared into the ground. The king had a case of lead made for the sword and sunk it down into lake Mälaren by Agnafit. He later marries his daughter to the Hunnish king Helgi Hildibrandsson, and they have the son Hildibrand^{1}. When Helgi is away, the aging king is attacked by Danes and killed by the Danish king Alf^{4} and his champion Aki^{1}, and they take Hildr^{2} away.		Ásmundar saga kappabanna	

== C ==
Figure	Names in medieval languages	Historical origin	Name meaning	Relationships	Early and English Attestations	Norse Attestations	German Attestations
Camalo	Latin: Camalo		The name is possibly from OHG gamal ("old, experienced").	The ruler of Metz and a vassal of Gunther. Gunther sends him to the fleeing Walter of Aquitaine to demand the stolen Hunnish treasure that Walter has with him and Walter kills him.			Waltharius
Caelic	Old English: Cælic		The name has been interpreted as a corruption of Kalew the name of a character in the Finnish Kalevala, but also as the OE cælic ("cup"), and as originating in the Irish name Ceallach (ON Kjallakr).	Mentioned in line 20 in Widsith, as the king of the Finns.	Widsith		
Casere				See Kjárr.			
Cunimund	Latin: Cunimundus	Historical king of the Gepids (died 567).	The first element is PGmc *kuni ("kin, family"), while the second element is PGmc *munda ("protection).	King of the Gepids and father of Rosamund. He is killed by Alboin, who marries Rosamund and forces her to drink from Cunimund's skull.	Historia Langobardorum		

== Sources ==
- Amodio, Mark C. (2013). The Anglo Saxon Literature Handbook. Vol. 15 (1 ed.). John Wiley & Sons, Incorporated. ISBN 9781118286517.
- Anderson, Earl R. (2008). "Beow the Boy-Wonder (Beowulf 12–25)". English Studies. 89 (6): 630–642. doi:10.1080/00138380802396045. S2CID 161149996.
- Andersson, Martin (August 2012). "Of Regner Lodbrog, Hugh Blair, and Mistranslations". Lovecraft Annual (6): 36–42. JSTOR 26868447.
- Benati, Chiara (2009). "Faroese Oral Tradition and the Icelandic Saga: the Case of the Ásmund Cycle". Brathair. 9 (1): 3–21.
- Brate, Erik (1904). "Agne". In Westrin, Th. (ed.). Nordisk Familjebok. Vol. 1 (2 ed.). p. 349.
- Byock, Jesse (1990). The Saga of the Volsungs, The Norse Epic of Sigurd the Dragon Slayer. Berkeley, Los Angeles, London: University of California Press. ISBN 978-0-520-23285-3.
- Byock, Jesse (1999). The Saga of King Hrolf Kraki. Penguin Classics. ISBN 014043593X.
- Stories and Ballads of the Far Past. Translated by Chadwick, Nora Kershaw. Cambridge at the University Press. 1921.
- Chambers, R. W. (1912). Widsith. Cambridge University Press.
- Clarke, M. G. (1911). Sidelights on Teutonic History During the Migration Period, being Studies of Beowulf and Other Old English Poems. Cambridge University Press.
- Cleasby, Richard; Vigfússon, Gudbrand (1874). An Icelandic-English dictionary. Oxford Clarendon Press.
- Currie, Edward (2020). "Hygelac's Raid in Historiography and Poetry: The King's Necklace and Beowulf as 'Epic'". Neophilologus. 104 (3): 391–400. doi:10.1007/s11061-019-09627-4. S2CID 211673261.
- Damico, Helen (1984). Beowulf's Wealhtheow and the Valkyrie Tradition. University of Wisconsin Press. ISBN 0-299-09500-2.
- Heimskringla (PDF). Vol. 1. Translated by Finlay, Alison; Faulkes, Anthony. Viking Society for Northern Research, University College London. 2016. ISBN 978-0-903521-86-4.
- DuBois, Thomas A (2012). "Diet and Deities, Contrastive Livelihoods and Animal Symbolism in Nordic Pre-Christian Religions". In Raudvere, Catharina; Schjødt, Jens Peter (eds.). More than Mythology: Narratives, Ritual Practices and Regional Distribution in Pre-Christian Scandinavian Religions. Nordic Academic Press. pp. 65–96. ISBN 978-91-85509-71-3.
- The Saga of King Heidrek the Wise (PDF). Translated by Finch, R. G. London and Edinburgh: Nelson. 1965.
- Finlay, Alison (2010). "The Saga of Ásmundr, Killer of Champions". In Martin, Arnold; Finlay, Alison (eds.). Making History, Essays on the Fornaldarsögur. Viking Society for Northern Research, University College, London. pp. 119–139. ISBN 978-0-903521-84-0.
- Friis-Jensen, Karsten, ed. (2015). Saxo Grammaticus Gesta Danorum, The History of the Danes. Vol. 1. Translated by Fisher, Peter. Oxford University Press. ISBN 978-0-19-82052-34.
- Förstemann, Ernst (1900). Altdeutsches Namenbuch, Band 1: Personennamen (2 ed.). Bonn.
- Frank, R. (2002). "Ongendus". In Müller, R. (ed.). Reallexikon der Germanischen Altertumskunde. Vol. 22. New York/Berlin: de Gruyter. ISBN 9783110173512.
- Garmonsway, G.N.; Simpson, Jacqueline; Ellis Davidson, Hilda (1968). Beowulf and its Analogues. . M. Dent & Sons ltd. SBN 460 03804 4.
- Gentry, Francis G.; McConnell, Winder; Müller, Ulrich; Wunderlich, Werner, eds. (2011) [2002]. The Nibelungen Tradition. An Encyclopedia. New York, Abingdon: Routledge. ISBN 978-0-8153-1785-2.
- Gillespie, George T. (1973). Catalogue of Persons Named in German Heroic Literature, 700-1600: Including Named Animals and Objects and Ethnic Names. Oxford: Oxford University. ISBN 978-0-19-815718-2.
- Ghosh, Shami (2007). "On the origins of Germanic heroic poetry: a case study of the legend of the Burgundians". Beiträge zur Geschichte der deutschen Sprache und Literatur. 129 (2): 220–252. doi:10.1515/BGSL.2007.220. S2CID 161148492.
- Gutenbrunner, Siegfried (1954). "Über einige Namen in der Nibelungendichtung". Zeitschrift für deutsches Altertum und deutsche Literatur. 84 (1): 44–64. JSTOR 20654647.
- Harðarson, Jón Axel (2004). "Namenwelten: Orts- und Personennamen in historischer Sicht". In van Nahl, Astrid; Elmevik, Lennart; Brink, Stefan (eds.). Reallexikon der Germanischen Altertumskunde. Vol. 44. Walter de Gruyter, Berlin, New York. ISBN 9783110181081.
- The Poetic Edda. Translated by Hollander, Lee M. Texas University Press. 1928.
- Higham, N.J. (1995). An English Empire: Bede and the Early Anglo-Saxon Kings. Manchester and New York: Manchester University Press. ISBN 0719044235.
- Jiriczek, Otto Luitpold (1898). Deutsche Heldensagen, Band 1. Strasbourg: Karl Trübner. ISBN 9783112176429.
- De Gamle Eddadigte. Translated by Jónsson, Finnur. G. E. C. Gats forlag, København. 1932.
- Kaliff, Anders; Oestigaard, Terje (2018). Bronze Age Håga and the Viking King Björn, A History of Interpretation and Documentation from AD 818 to 2018. Occasional Papers in Archaeology. Uppsala University. ISBN 978-91-506-2711-4.
- Kaufmann, Hennig (1968). Ergänzungsband zu Ernst Förstemann: Personennamen. Wilhelm Fink.
- Kazanski, Michel (1991). Les Goths (Ier-VIIe s. ap. J.C.). Paris, Errance. ISBN 2-87772-062-4.
- Klaeber, Friedrich (2008). Fulk, R.D.; Bjork, Robert E.; Niles, John D. (eds.). Klaeber's Beowulf and The Fight at Finnsburg. University of Toronto Press. pp. 274–277. ISBN 978-0-8020-9843-6.
- Krause, Arnulf (2010). Reclams Lexikon der germanischen Mythologie und Heldensage. Reclam. ISBN 978-3-15-010778-2.
- Phelpstead, Carl, ed. (2001). A History of Norway and the Passion and Miracles of the Blessed Óláfr (PDF). Translated by Kunin, Devra. Viking Society for Northern Research. ISBN 978-0-903521-48-2.
- Larsson, Mats G. (2004). "Götarnas riken". Upptäcktsfärder till Sveriges enande. Atlantis, Stockholm. pp. 179–170. ISBN 9789173535182.
- Lexer, Matthias (1872–1878). Mittelhochdeutsches Handwörterbuch (3 vols.). Hirzel.
- Maenchen-Helfen, Otto J. (1973). Knight, Max (ed.). The World of the Huns: Studies in Their History and Culture. University of California Press. ISBN 978-0-520-01596-8.
- Malone, Kemp (1923). The Literary History of Hamlet, I. The Early Tradition (1967 ed.). Swets & Zeitlinger N.V., Amsterdam.
- Malone, Kemp (1953). "Royal Names in Old English Poetry". Names. 1 (3): 153–162. doi:10.1179/nam.1953.1.3.153.
- Malone, Kemp (1930). "Ingeld". Modern Philology. 27 (3): 257–276. doi:10.1086/387833. S2CID 224833211.
- Malone, Kemp (1936). Wisith (1962 ed.). Rosenkilde and Bagger, Copenhagen.
- McTurk, Rory W. (1991). Studies in Ragnars saga Loðbrókar and its Major Scandinavian Analogues. The Society for the Study of Mediæval Languages and Literature, Oxford. ISBN 0-907570-08-9.
- McTurk, Rory W. (2006). "Kings and Kingship in Viking Northumbria" (PDF). In McKinnell, John S.; Ashurst, David; Kick, Donata (eds.). The Fantastic in Old Norse Icelandic Literature, Preprint Papers of the 13th International Saga Conference, Durham and York 6th-12th August 2006. Vol. 2. pp. 681–688.
- Mueller, Eugen Hartmuth (1939). "Deutung einiger Namen im Nibelungenlied". Monatshefte für Deutschen Unterricht. 31 (6): 274–284. JSTOR 30169580.
- Miller, Clarence H. (2007). "Fragments of Danish History". ANQ: A Quarterly Journal of Short Articles, Notes and Reviews. 20 (3): 9–22. doi:10.3200/ANQQ.20.3.9-22. S2CID 161363696.
- Nagy, Michael S. (2018). "Ásmundar saga kappabanna: Some Inconsistencies Explored". ANQ: A Quarterly Journal of Short Articles, Notes and Reviews. 31 (1): 1–8. doi:10.1080/0895769X.2017.1354176. S2CID 165384985.
- Näsström, Britt-Mari (1996). "Freyja, a Goddess with Many Names". In Billington, Sandra; Green, Miranda (eds.). The Concept of the Goddess. Taylor & Francis Group. pp. 68–77. ISBN 9780203456385.
- Neidorf, Leonard (2013a). "Beowulf before Beowulf: Anglo-Saxon Anthroponymy and Heroic Legend". The Review of English Studies. 64 (266): 553–573. doi:10.1093/res/hgs108.
- Nedoma, Robert (1999). "Die Runeninschrift auf der Gürtelschnalle von Pforzen–ein Zeugnis der germanischen Heldensage". In Bammesberger, Alfred (ed.). Pforzen und Bergakker neue Untersuchungen zu Runeninschriften. Vandenhoeck & Ruprecht. pp. 98–109.
- Neidorf, Leonard (2018b). "Wealhtheow and Her Name: Etymology, Characterization, and Textual Criticism". Neophilologus. 102 (1): 75–89. doi:10.1007/s11061-017-9538-4. S2CID 165875310.
- Nerman, Birger (1919). "Kung Agne och hans död på Agnefit". Fornvännen.
- Nerman, Birger (1925). Svenska rikets uppkomst. Stockholm: Generalstabens litografiska anstalt.
- Newton, Sam (1993). The Origins of Beowulf and the Pre-Viking Kingdom of East Anglia. Cambridge University Press. ISBN 9780859914727.
- Noreen, Adolf (1904a). "Aslög". In Westrin, Th. (ed.). Nordisk Familjebok. Vol. 2 (2 ed.). pp. 208–209.
- Noreen, Adolf (1904b). "Aun". In Westrin, Th. (ed.). Nordisk Familjebok. Vol. 2 (2 ed.). pp. 429–430.
- Noreen, Adolf (1922). "Yngve". In Westrin, Th. (ed.). Nordisk Familjebok. Vol. 33 (2 ed.). p. 563.
- Noreen, Adolf (1904). "Aun". In Westrin, Th. (ed.). Nordisk Familjebok. Vol. 2 (2 ed.). pp. 429f.
- Olrik, Axel (1919). The Heroic Legends of Denmark. Translated by Hollander, Lee M. New York: The American-Scandinavian Foundation.
- Olson, Oscar Ludvig (1916). "The Relation of the Hrólfs saga kraka and the Bjarkarímur to Beowulf". Publications of the Society for the Advancement of Scandinavian Study. 3 (1): 1–104. JSTOR 40914974.
- Orchard, Andy (1997). Dictionary of Norse Myth and Legend. Cassel, London. ISBN 0-304-34520-2.
- Orel, Vladimir E. (2003). A Handbook of Germanic Etymology. Brill. ISBN 978-90-04-12875-0.
- Seven Viking Romances. Translated by Pálsson, Hermann; Edwards, Paul. Penguin Books. 1985. ISBN 0140444742.
- Peterson, Lena (2004). Lexikon över urnordiska personnamn. Uppsala: Institutet för språk och folkminnen.
- Peterson, Lena (2007). Nordiskt runnamnslexikon. Uppsala: Institutet för språk och folkminnen.
- Schneider, Hermann (1934). Germanische Heldensage, Bd. 2,2: Englische Heldensage - festländische Heldensage in nordgermanischer und englischer Überlieferung - verlorene Heldensage. de Gruyter.
- Shaull, Erin M. (2017). "Ecgþeow, Brother of Ongenþeow, and the Problem of Beowulf's Swedishness". Neophilologus. 101 (2): 263–275. doi:10.1007/s11061-016-9508-2. S2CID 164608334.
- Shaw, Philip A. (2020). Names and Naming in 'Beowulf': Studies in Heroic Narrative Tradition. London, New York: Bloomsbury Academic. ISBN 978-1-3501-4576-4.
- Shippey, Tom (2010). ""Hrólfs saga kraka" and the Legend of Lejre". In Martin, Arnold; Finlay, Alison (eds.). Making History, Essays on the Fornaldarsögur. Viking Society for Northern Research, University College London. ISBN 978-0-903521-84-0.
- Simek, Rudolf (1993). Dictionary of Northern Mythology. Translated by Hall; Angela. D. S. Brewer. ISBN 0-85991-369-4.
- The Saga of King Heidrek the Wise (PDF). Translated by Tolkien, Christopher. 1960.
- Uecker, Heiko (1972). Germanische Heldensage. Stuttgart: Metzler. ISBN 3476101061.
- de Vries, Jan (1962). Altnordisches Etymologisches Worterbuch (1977 ed.). Brill. ISBN 978-90-04-05436-3.
- de Vries, Jan (1962). Altnordisches Etymologisches Worterbuch (2000 ed.). Brill. ISBN 90-04-05436-7.
- The Sagas of Ragnar Lodbrok. Translated by Waggoner, Ben. New Haven: Troth Publications. 2009.
- Sagas of Imagination. Translated by Waggoner, Ben. New Haven: Troth Publications. 2018. ISBN 9781941136171.
- Wessén, Elias (1927). "Eddadikterna om Helge Hundingsbane". Fornvännen.
