= The Story of Sigurd the Volsung and the Fall of the Niblungs =

Poem by William Morris

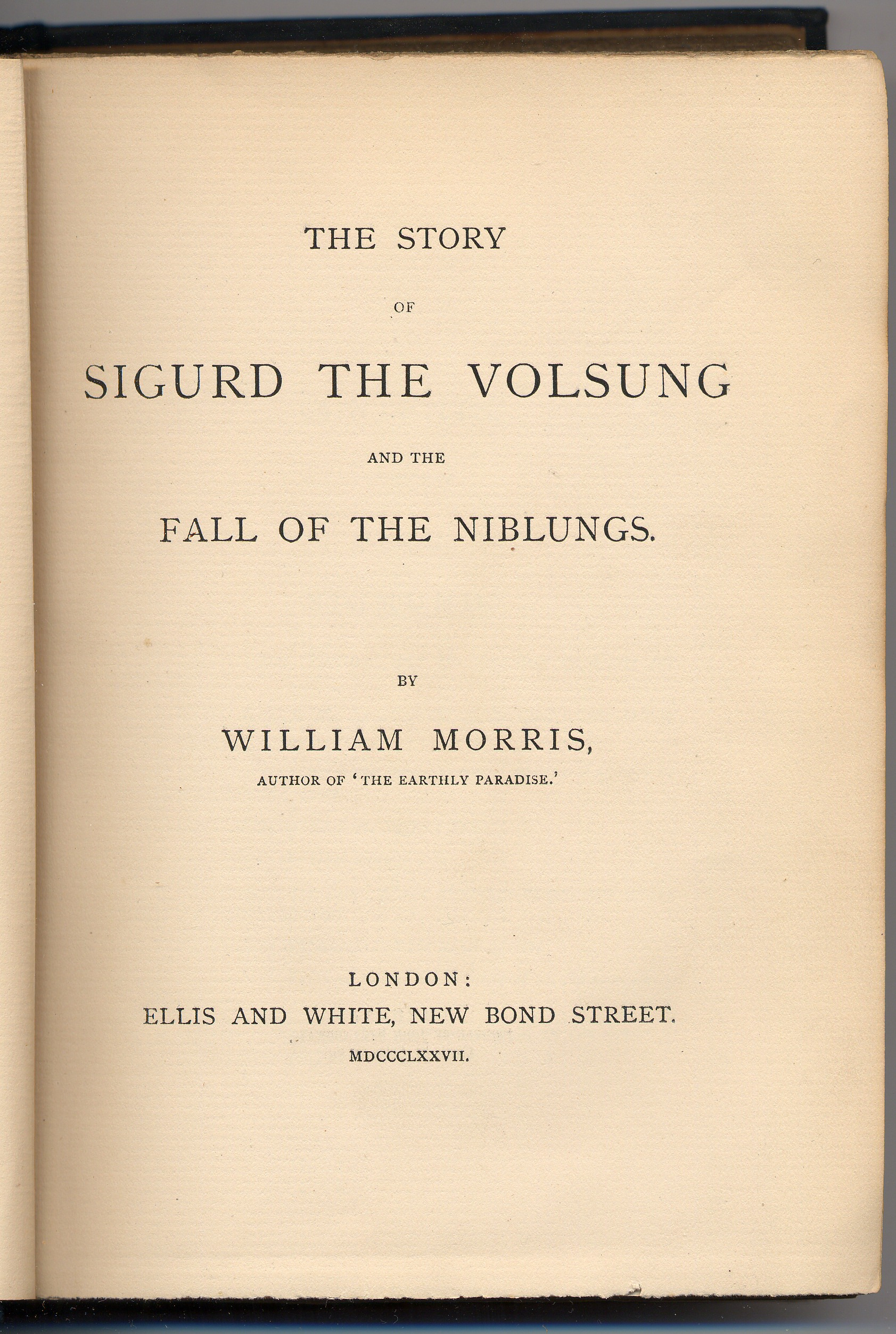
- Title page of the first edition, 1876, printed as MDCCCLXXVII (1877)
- Author: William Morris "Author of 'The Earthly Paradise'"
- Illustrator: Edward Burne-Jones
- Language: English
- Genre: Epic poem
- Publisher: Ellis and White
- Publication date: 1876
- Publication place: United Kingdom
- Media type: Print (hardback)
- Pages: 392 pp

The Story of Sigurd the Volsung and the Fall of the Niblungs (1876) is an epic poem of over 10,000 lines by William Morris that tells the tragic story, drawn from the Volsunga Saga and the Elder Edda, of the Norse hero Sigmund, his son Sigurd (the equivalent of Siegfried in the Nibelungenlied and Wagner's Ring of the Nibelung) and Sigurd's wife Gudrun. It sprang from a fascination with the Volsung legend that extended back twenty years to the author's youth, and had already resulted in several other literary and scholarly treatments of the story. It was Morris's own favorite of his poems, and was enthusiastically praised both by contemporary critics and by such figures as T. E. Lawrence and George Bernard Shaw. In recent years it has been rated very highly by many William Morris scholars, but has never succeeded in finding a wide readership on account of its great length and archaic diction. It has been seen as an influence on such fantasy writers as Andrew Lang. The Story of Sigurd is available in modern reprints, both in its original form and in a cut-down version, but there is no critical edition.

== Synopsis ==
=== Book I: Sigmund ===
The poem opens with the marriage of king Volsung's daughter Signy to Siggeir, king of the Goths. The bridal feast is interrupted by the arrival of a stranger, the god Odin in disguise, who drives a sword into a tree-trunk. Though everyone tries to draw the sword, Volsung's son Sigmund is the only man who can do it. The disappointed Siggeir takes his new wife home, inviting Volsung to visit him. When Volsung does so he is killed by Siggeir, and his sons are taken prisoner. While in captivity they are all killed by a wolf, apart from Sigmund who escapes into the forest. Signy sends Sigmund her two sons to help him in avenging their family, but Sigmund accepts only Sinfjotli, the hardier of the two. Sigmund and Sinfjotli kill Siggeir and burn down his hall, then return to their ancestral home, the hall of the Volsungs. Sigmund marries Borghild, while Sinfjotli goes abroad with Borghild's brother, quarrels with him, and kills him. On his return Sinfjotli is poisoned by Borghild, and she is turned out by Sigmund, who instead marries Hiordis. Sigmund is killed in battle, and the pregnant Hiordis is taken to live in the hall of King Elf in Denmark.

=== Book II: Regin ===
There she gives birth to Sigurd. Sigurd is raised by Regin, a cunning old man, and when he grows to manhood he asks for a horse from King Elf. Elf bids him choose the one he likes best, and Sigurd takes the best horse, and names it Grani. Sigurd is now urged by Regin to attack Fafnir, a dragon who guards a hoard of gold. This treasure is a curse to all who possess it. Fafnir, Regin says, was originally a human being; indeed, the dragon was Regin's brother and thus the gold rightfully belongs to Regin. He tries and fails to forge an adequate sword for Sigurd, but Sigurd produces the shattered fragments of Odin's sword, which he has inherited from Sigmund, and from these fragments Regin forges a mighty sword, named "the Wrath" by Sigurd. Sigurd makes his way to Fafnir's lair, kills him, drinks his blood, and roasts and eats his heart. This gives him the power to understand the voices of birds and to read the hearts of men. He now understands that Regin intends to kill him, and so he kills Regin and takes Fafnir's treasure for himself. On his journey homeward Sigurd comes across an unearthly blaze on the slopes of Hindfell. He rides straight into it and comes unharmed to the heart of the fire, where he finds a beautiful sleeping woman clad in armour. He wakes her, and she tells him that she is Brynhild, a handmaiden of Odin whom he has left here as a punishment for disobedience. They pledge themselves to each other, Sigurd places a ring from Fafnir's hoard on her finger, and he leaves.

=== Book III: Brynhild ===
The scene changes to the court of Giuki, the Niblung king. Giuki's daughter Gudrun has a dream in which she encounters a beautiful but ominous falcon and takes it to her breast. Anxious to learn the meaning of the dream she rides to visit Brynhild, who tells her that she will marry a king, but that her life will be darkened by war and death. Gudrun returns home. Sigurd revisits Brynhild and they again declare their love for each other. He then rides to the Niblung court, where he joins them in making war on the Southland, winning great glory for himself. The witch Grimhild, Gudrun's mother, gives Sigurd a potion that makes him fall in love with Gudrun. Completely under her spell, he marries her and sets out to win Brynhild for Gudrun's brother Gunnar. Visiting Brynhild again, this time magically disguised as Gunnar, and again penetrating the fire that surrounds her, he reminds her that she is promised to whoever can overcome the supernatural fire, and so deceives her into reluctantly vowing to marry Gunnar. Brynhild goes to the Niblung land and carries out her promise. She is distraught at this tragic outcome, and doubly so when Gudrun spitefully tells her of the trick by which Sigurd deceived her into an unwanted wedding. Brynhild now urges Gunnar and his brothers Hogni and Guttorm to kill Sigurd. Guttorm murders Sigurd as he lies in bed, but the dying Sigurd throws his sword and kills Guttorm as he leaves. Brynhild, filled with remorse, commits suicide so that she and Sigurd can be burned on a single funeral pyre.

=== Book IV: Gudrun ===
The widowed Gudrun now marries Brynhild's brother, king Atli, but as the years pass by her memories of Sigurd do not fade, and she longs for vengeance. She reminds Atli of Fafnir's hoard and urges him to win it for himself. Atli invites the surviving Niblung brothers to a feast, and when they arrive he threatens them with death if they do not give him the treasure. Gunnar and Hogni defy him to do his worst, and a battle breaks out in Atli's hall. The Niblung brothers are overwhelmed by superior force, tied up and killed. Atli holds a victory-feast, at the end of which he and all his court lie sleeping drunkenly in the hall. Gudrun, having lost everyone she loves, burns down the hall, kills Atli with a sword-thrust, and throws herself from a cliff to her death.

== Genesis ==
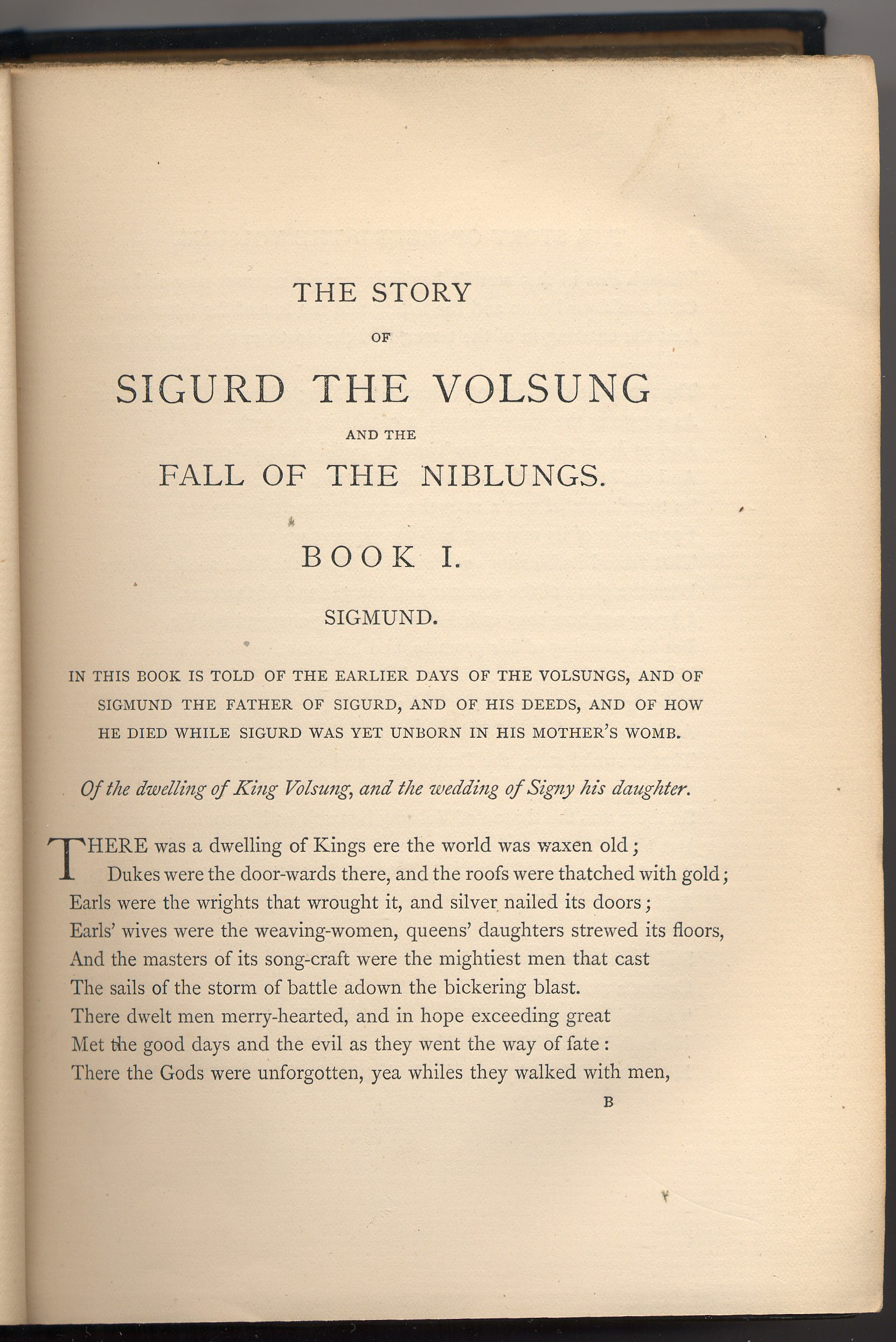
First page of first edition. "In this book is told of the earlier days of the Volsungs, and of Sigmund the father of Sigurd, and of his deeds..."

Morris first came across the story of the Volsungs, "the grandest tale that ever was told" as he later called it, as a young man, when he read a summary of it in Benjamin Thorpe's Northern Mythology, which became a favourite book of his. In his The Earthly Paradise (1868–70) he included a versification of the story of Sigurd's daughter Aslaug, which he may have taken from Thorpe. In 1868 he began to learn Old Norse from the Icelandic scholar Eiríkr Magnússon, and embarked with him on a series of collaborative translations from the Icelandic classics. In 1870 they published Völsunga Saga: The Story of the Volsungs and Niblungs, with Certain Songs from the Elder Edda, claiming uncompromisingly in the preface that "This is the Great Story of the North, which should be to all our race what the Tale of Troy was to the Greeks".

== Composition ==
While still working on the prose translation Morris wrote to Charles Eliot Norton:

I had it in my head to write an epic of it, but though I still hanker after it, I see clearly it would be foolish, for no verse could render the best parts of it, and it would only be a flatter and tamer version of a thing already existing.

Morris visited Iceland in 1871 and 1873. Also in 1873 he was aware that Richard Wagner was writing Der Ring des Nibelungen, and wrote:

I look upon it as nothing short of desecration to bring such a tremendous and world-wide subject under the gaslights of an opera: the most rococo and degraded of all forms of art – the idea of a sandy-haired German tenor tweedledeeing over the unspeakable woes of Sigurd, which even the simplest words are not typical enough to express!

Morris began work on Sigurd the Volsung in October 1875, completing it the following year. In the end the poem extended to over 10,000 lines. He took both the Volsunga Saga and the corresponding poems of the Poetic Edda|Elder Edda as his basic sources, but felt free to alter them as he thought necessary. The poem is in rhyming hexameter couplets, often with anapaestic movement and a feminine caesura. In keeping with the Germanic theme Morris used kennings, a good deal of alliteration, and wherever possible words of Anglo-Saxon origin. This resulted in a difficult and archaic diction, involving such lines as:

The folk of the war-wand's forgers wrought never better steel
Since first the burg of heaven uprose for man-folk's weal.

— Book 1, lines 137-138

and

So they make the yoke-beasts ready, and dight the wains for the way,

— Book 3, line 109

== Critical reception ==
According to Morris' daughter May it was the work he "held most highly and wished to be remembered by". Contemporary reviewers mostly agreed. In America The Atlantic Monthly compared it to Tennyson's Idylls of the King, writing that

Sigurd, the Volsung is the second great English epic of our generation...and it ranks after Tennyson's "Arthuriad" in order of time only. It fully equals that monumental work in the force and pathos of the story told, while it surpasses it in unity and continuity of interest.

Edmund Gosse, in The Academy, enthused: "The style he has adopted is more exalted and less idyllic, more rapturous and less luxurious – in a word, more spirited and more virile than that of any of his earlier works." The Literary World agreed that it was "the manliest and the loveliest work of Mr. Morris's genius", going on to predict that "Whatever its immediate reception may be, William Morris's Sigurd is certain eventually to take its place among the few great epics of the English tongue." The note of caution as to the reaction of the 19th century reading public was sounded more strongly by several other critics. Theodore Watts wrote in The Athenaeum, "That this is a noble poem there can be no doubt; but whether it will meet with ready appreciation and sympathy in this country is a question not so easily disposed of." He thought it "Mr. Morris's greatest achievement", but worried about the choice of metre, which he thought monotonous in effect. In an unfavourable review for Fraser's Magazine, Henry Hewlett complained that "The narrative seldom rises above mediocrity...the memory finds little to carry away, and the ear still less to haunt it." He was particularly repulsed by the Dark Age outlook he believed Morris to have adopted:

A poem...which, like Sigurd, reflects, with hard, uncompromising realism, an obsolete code of ethics, and a barbarous condition of society, finds itself irreconcilably at discord with the key of nineteenth-century feeling. Deprived of its strongest claim to interest, a sympathetic response in the moral and religious sentiment of its readers, it can only appeal to the intellect as a work of art, or as a more or less successful attempt at antiquarian restoration. It may be admired and applauded by the lettered few; but it will not be taken to the nation's heart.

By contrast, the North American Review believed it to be Morris's method "To reproduce the antique, not as the ancients felt it, but as we feel it,– to transfuse it with modern thought and emotion."

After Morris's death interest in his poems began to fade, but a few enthusiasts for Sigurd the Volsung continued to speak out in its favour. Arthur Symons wrote in 1896 that Sigurd the Volsung "remains his masterpiece of sustained power", and in 1912 the young T. E. Lawrence called it "the best poem I know" According to the philologist E. V. Gordon Sigurd the Volsung is "incomparably the greatest poem – perhaps the only great poem – in English which has been inspired by Norse literature", and George Bernard Shaw went so far as to call it "the greatest epic since Homer". However the novelist Eric Linklater, while acknowledging that "Morris tells his story with endless invention, with a brilliant profusion of detail", complained that the poem's "Thames-side heroism" conveyed too facile a sense of tragedy. It has never had a wide readership, and contemporary judgements on Sigurd tend to depend upon the judge's opinion of Morris's verse in general. Some find its length and archaic diction off-putting, but many modern critics agree with Morris that it is his finest poem.

== Editions ==
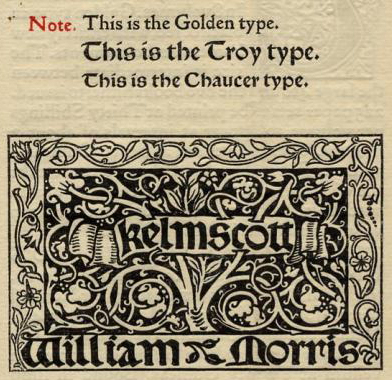
Type faces designed by Morris for the Kelmscott Press.

The poem was published by Ellis and White in November 1876, although the date appeared on the imprint as 1877. They issued a second edition in 1877 and a third in 1880. The book was brought out again in 1887 by Reeves and Turner, and in 1896 by Longman. In 1898, two years after Morris's death, a revised text was published by the Kelmscott Press in an edition limited to 160 paper copies and 6 vellum copies, with wood cuts by Sir Edward Burne-Jones. In 1910 Longman issued an edition in which some passages were replaced with prose summaries by Winifred Turner and Helen Scott. In 1911 the same firm reprinted the original version as volume 12 of The Collected Works of William Morris, with an introduction by May Morris; in the absence of a critical edition this is the one generally cited by scholars. In recent years Sigurd the Volsung has been frequently reprinted, sometimes in the Turner and Scott abridged version.

== Influence on later fantasy writers ==
Magnússon and Morris remained the only English translation of Volsunga saga until Margaret Schlauch's version in 1930. As such it influenced such writers as Andrew Lang, who adapted it in his Red Fairy Book. In a letter, Tolkien mentions that he wished to imitate "Morris' romances"; among his works is a version of the Sigurd story, The Legend of Sigurd and Gudrun (published posthumously in 2009). Stefan Arvidsson compares Morris's Sigurd and Tolkien's Legend:

In contrast to Morris’ work, written as it is in heavily archaic, difficult-to-penetrate prose, Tolkien's recently-published draft was closer in both style and content to the heroic sagas of The Poetic Edda.

Other authors have been inspired more or less directly by the Volsung cycle, following Morris' lead. For example, Kevin Crossley-Holland published his own translation of the myths, Axe-age, Wolf-age.

== Fight for Right ==
In 1916, during World War I, composer Edward Elgar set to music words taken from The Story of Sigurd, producing the song "Fight for Right". It was dedicated to Members of the Fight for Right Movement, a pro-war organisation dedicated to continuation of the war until victory. William Morris' words were deemed fitting to express this idea.

== Sources ==
- Carpenter, Humphrey, ed. (2023) [1981]. The Letters of J. R. R. Tolkien: Revised and Expanded Edition. New York: HarperCollins. ISBN 978-0-35-865298-4.
- Faulkner, Peter (1995). William Morris: The Critical Heritage. London: Routledge and Kegan Paul. ISBN 0-7100-7520-0.
