= Helgakviða =

Helgakviða may refer to:

- Helgakviða Hjörvarðssonar ("Lay of Helgi Hjörvarðsson"), a poem collected in the Poetic Edda
- Helgakviða Hundingsbana I, the First Lay of Helgi Hundingsbane, an Old Norse poem found in the Poetic Edda
- Helgakviða Hundingsbana II, the Second Lay of Helgi Hundingsbane, an Old Norse poem found in the Poetic Edda
