= Helgakviða Hundingsbana I =

Old Norse poem found in the Poetic Edda

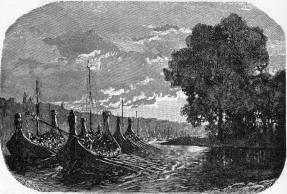
Helgi's army departs to fight for Sigrún.

"Völsungakviða" or "Helgakviða Hundingsbana I" ("The First Lay of Helgi Hundingsbane") is an Old Norse poem found in the Poetic Edda. It is only preserved in the Icelandic manuscript Codex Regius (ca. 1270). It constitutes one of the Helgi lays, together with Helgakviða Hundingsbana II and Helgakviða Hjörvarðssonar.

The locations in the poem have been fervently debated with a Danish school maintaining Danish origins and locations and a Swedish one pointing out that locations (e.g. Brávellir and Brandey) and characters (Ylfings, Högni and Granmarr) place the events in Östergötland and Södermanland. The poem is also ambiguous in attributing Helgi to the Ylfing, Yngling and Völsung clans, which suggests a merging of originally unrelated traditions.

In the Edda, the poem is a sequel to Helgakviða Hjörvarðssonar whose heroes Helgi Hjörvarðsson and Sváfa are reborn as Helgi Hundingsbane and Sigrún. However, in Codex Regius, it is actually followed by Helgakviða Hjörvarðssonar.

The poem begins in a location called Brálund with the birth of Helgi Hundingbane, the son of Sigmund and Borghild. Norns arrived at the dwelling to shape his future as a hero.

1. Ár var alda,
þat er arar gullu,
hnigu heilög vötn
af Himinfjöllum;
þá hafði Helga
inn hugumstóra
Borghildr borit
í Brálundi.

2. Nótt varð í bæ,
nornir kómu,
þær er öðlingi
aldr of skópu;
þann báðu fylki
frægstan verða
ok buðlunga
beztan þykkja.

Translation:

1. In olden days,
when eagles screamed,
And holy streams
from heaven's crags fell,
Was Helgi then,
the hero-hearted,
Borghild's son,
in Bralund born.

2. 'Twas night in the dwelling,
and Norns there came,
Who shaped the life
of the lofty one;
They bade him most famed
of fighters all
And best of princes
ever to be.

When Helgi was but fifteen years old, he slew a man named Hunding. This caused Hunding's sons Eyjólfr, Álfr, Hjörvarðr and Hávarðr to approach Helgi asking for wergild and the return of the booty Helgi had taken from their father. When Helgi refused them this, Hunding's sons declared war and in the ensuing battle, Helgi killed all of Hunding's sons.

Helgi met the Valkyrie Sigrún who informed him that her father Högni has betrothed her to Höðbroddr, the unworthy son of king Granmarr of the Hniflung clan. Helgi promised to take on Höðbroddr and to claim her as his own. Helgi then assembled a mighty host and departed to wage war on Höðbrodd's family.

When they had arrived at Granmar's kingdom, the poem deals with a flyting between Helgi's half-brother Sinfjötli and Höðbrodd's brother Guðmundr. Then, the armies clashed at Frekastein and Helgi was victorious winning Sigrún as his bride.
