= Borghild (name) =

Borghildur
- Gender: Female

Origin
- Origin: Old Norse
- Meaning: borg (protection), hildr (battle)
- Region of origin: Scandinavia

Other names
- Related names: Borghildur

Borghild (and versions like Burghild and Borghildur) is a female given name formed from "borg" (protection) and "hild" (battle).

As of December 31, 2005, there were 585 persons in Sweden named Borghild. It is more common in Norway. In August 2006 there were 4213 women in Norway named Borghild. The name was at its top in 1905.

== Borghild ==
- Borghild, wife of Sigmund
- Borghild Bondevik Haga (1906–1990), Norwegian politician
- Borghild Holmsen (1865–1938), Norwegian pianist, composer and music critic
- Borghild Niskin (1924–2013), Norwegian alpine skier
- Borghild Røyseland (1926–2020), Norwegian politician
- Borghild Tenden (born 1951), Norwegian politician
