= Helgi Hundingsbane =

Norse mythical character

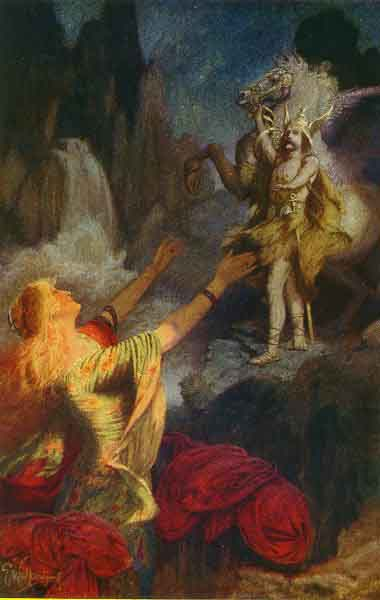
Helgi returns to Valhalla

Helgi Hundingsbane is a hero in Norse sagas. Helgi appears in Volsunga saga and in two lays in the Poetic Edda named Helgakviða Hundingsbana I and Helgakviða Hundingsbana II. The Poetic Edda relates that Helgi and his mistress Sigrún were Helgi Hjörvarðsson and Sváva of the Helgakviða Hjörvarðssonar reborn. They were once again reborn as Helgi Haddingjaskati and Kára whose story survives as a part of the Hrómundar saga Gripssonar.

== Earning his name and meeting a Valkyrie ==
Helgi appears to be the son of Sigmund and Borghild, and only fifteen years old he avenges his father by slaying Hunding, the king of the Saxons. This gives him the cognomen Hunding's bane. He continues with his warlike feats and one day, as he stands aboard his longship, he is visited by a valkyrie named Sigrún, who can ride through the air and over the sea and who knows well about his feats. She embraces him and kisses him, and he immediately falls in love with her.

== Battle ==
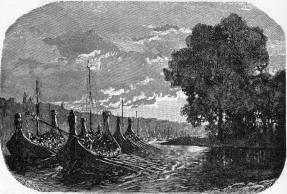

However, her father king Högne of Östergötland has promised her to Hothbrodd, the son of king Granmar of Södermanland. Helgi collects a force at Brandey (probably modern Brändholmen/Brändö, 58°36′N 16°50′E, at the estuary of the bay of Bråviken, until 1813 named Brandö, the modern Swedish form of Brandey) and goes to Granmarr's kingdom. It is retold in detail about the gathering of the forces and of how, in a great battle, Helgi and his brother Sinfjötli fight with Högne, his son Dag, Granmar and all of Granmar's sons Hothbrodd, Starkad and Gudmund. Everyone dies but Helgi, Sinfjötli and Högne's youngest son Dag. Sigrún bids an angry farewell to the dying Hothbrodd and cries with happiness when she learns that her whole family is dead but Dag, who swears allegiance to Helgi.

== Death ==
Sigrún and Helgi marry and they have several sons. Dag is, however, tormented by the fact that honour demands that he avenge his father. Dag sacrifices to Odin in return for vengeance. Odin lends him a spear, and he dutifully pierces Helgi with it. Then he goes to Sigrún to give his condolences, which makes her curse him:

The wind would stop every time he entered a ship.
The fastest horse would not carry him if he is hunted.
His sword would wound no one but himself.

She tells Dag to flee into the woods and to thenceforth live on carrion. Then she buries Helgi in a barrow, but Helgi's soul is already in Valhalla, where Odin tells him to make himself comfortable. Helgi gladly obeys and orders Hunding to feed the pigs, to wash the einherjars' feet and to do other menial chores.

== Burial mound reunion ==
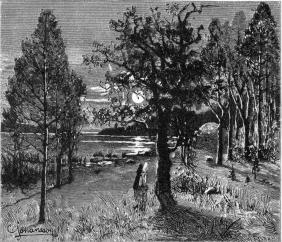
Sigrun waiting by Helgi's barrow

One evening, someone says that he has seen Helgi ride with a large retinue into his own barrow, and so Sigrún goes to the barrow in order to see Helgi. His hair is covered with frost, his body is sullied with blood and his hands are wet. He explains that this is because every tear she has shed has fallen wet and cold on him. In spite of this, she prepares the bed in his mound and they spend a comfortable and wonderful night together.

Before day breaks, Helgi has to return to Valhalla. Sigrún returns home and spends the rest of her life waiting in vain for Helgi to return to his barrow one more time.

== Comments ==
In the second verse of Helgakviða Hundingsbana I we learn that the norns weave the destiny of Helgi, son of Borghild, called Great of Heart (Hugumstóri), that he will become the best of the Budlungs, the clan who bore Attila the Hun (Atlí) and Brunhild. Apart from this, Helgi is attributed to two different genealogies in the sagas. He is described as an Ylfing (the Wylfings of Beowulf) in several places, but also as a Völsung since he is described as the son of Sigmund and Borghild and the brother of Sinfjotle and Sigurd. This is probably due to a merger between the legend of the Völsungs and an earlier legend of Helgi Hundingsbane.

Both Högne and Helgi are described as kings of East Götaland, which may seem to be a contradiction. However, in the Heimskringla we learn that Högne was the father-in-law of the Ylfing Hjörvard. Since both are Ylfings or married into the clan, the battle between Helgi and Högne was apparently a civil war. The existence of a civil war may explain why Hjörvard was a sea-king, a man without roof, despite being described by Sögubrot as a former ruler of East Götaland. If so, the legends may be based on a civil war where Högne had usurped the throne from Hjörvard, but was killed by Hjörvard's kinsman Helgi. Correction.... Högne was the father-in-law of Granmer who married his daughter Hilda. Hjörvard was married to Hildagunn daughter of Granmer. Thus Granmer was Hjörvard father in law and Hogne his grandfather-in-law.

The Völsung origin is most likely a later addition, since the legends of Sigurd describe events in the 5th century and those of Helgi describe events in the 7th century.

Helgi's ancestry (Ylfing, Völsung)

Hljod	Völsung
Borghild	Sigmund	Signý
Sigrún	Helgi	Hámundr	Sinfjötli
Many sons

Sigrún's ancestry

Note: Bragi, Dagr and Sigrun are possibly Högni's grandchildren instead of his children. This would make the betrothal between Höðbrodd and Sigrún one between cousins, which is more likely than Höðbrodd marrying his aunt.

Högni
Granmar	Hilda	Hildur	Bragi	Dagr	Helgi	Sigrún	Höðbrodd (engaged)
Many sons

Granmar's ancestry (Yngling)

Granmar	Hilda
Hjörvard	Hildagun	Starkad	Guðmundr	Höðbrodd	Sigrún (engaged)
Hjörmund

Comments: There were four family branches:

1.House of Hogne    (Ylfing)   (Main branch)
2.House of Hjörvard (Ylfing)   (Married Granmars daughter and granddaughter of Högni)
3.House of Helgi    (Ylfing)   (Married daughter or granddaughter of Högni) 
4.House of Granmar  (Yngling)  (Married daughter of Högni)

Granmar is listed as a Yngling sub-king who was invited by the Ingjald the Ill-ruler as it is also stated that Sweden was divided between Erik and Alrik. The descendants of these two kings had spread, cleared land and settled new territories, until there were several petty kings. Ingjald killed all these kings and only Granmar remained.

Granmar seems to have had an agenda in uniting the branches of the Ylfings, as he was distrustful of his kinsman Ingild Ill-ruler, who killed all the other kings of Yngling kin. He married his daughter to Hjorvard. Later Granmar and his son-in-law Hjörvard of the Ylfings was ambushed in one of their halls and burned to death by Ingild.

Since Helgi supposedly killed Granmar and Högni, he may have been allied with Ingold Ill-ruler. Something also reported done by Injald. This is if he exited at all. As Helgi the Ylfing and Helgi the Volsung are two merged legends. If Helgi the Ylfing existed it has been argued he was a relative of Hjorvard who claimed the throne after Hjorvards death.

Dagr was banished by Sigrún for killing Helgi. He henceforth lived on carrion in the woods.

Helgi's sons most likely ruled until Harold Hildetand arrived to claim his Kingdom. Hjörmund was later given the kingdom of his father Hjörvard by Harold Hildetand, thus ending all internal strife. According to sources he was a great grandson of Hogne, grandson of Granmar and son of Hjorvard/

== Locations ==
Scholarship about the localisation of the Helgi sagas is divided between a Swedish and a Danish school of thought:

=== The Swedish school ===
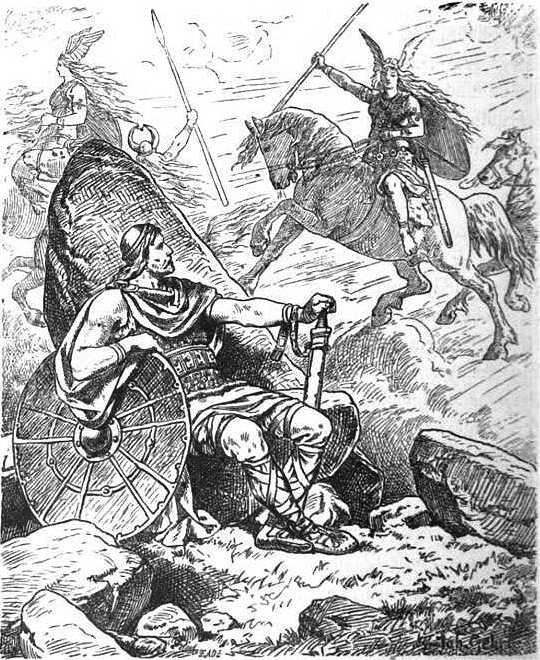
"Helgi and Sigrun" (1901) by Johannes Gehrts.

In Gesta Danorum, which was written to glorify the past of the Danish nation, Helgi Saxo appears to have mixed Helgi Hundingbane with the Danish king Halga, as he claims that Helgi killed a Saxon king named Hunding. Hothbrodd was made a Swedish king and given Ohthere's position in the line. Because of this the Norwegian scholar Bugge tried, in 1896, to connect him to the Skjöldung Helgi.

Due to this modification, Helgi's residence Hringstaðir is occasionally interpreted as the Danish Ringsted. Others have remarked that, in the Norse sagas the Ylfings are never called Danish, and the only territory that they are said to have ruled is East Götaland. In the first poem (Helgakviða Hundingsbana I), Sinfjotle has his residence on the Bravellir (the plain west of Bråviken in East Götaland, see Battle of Bråvalla) and Helgi resides at Hringstaðir (probably modern Ringstad, an old royal estate on the same plain existing well before, and during, the 7th century).

Moreover, in the Heimskringla, their enemy Granmar (the father of Hothbrodd) was the king of Södermanland, which is adjacent to East Götaland, and not of Sweden.

=== The Danish school ===
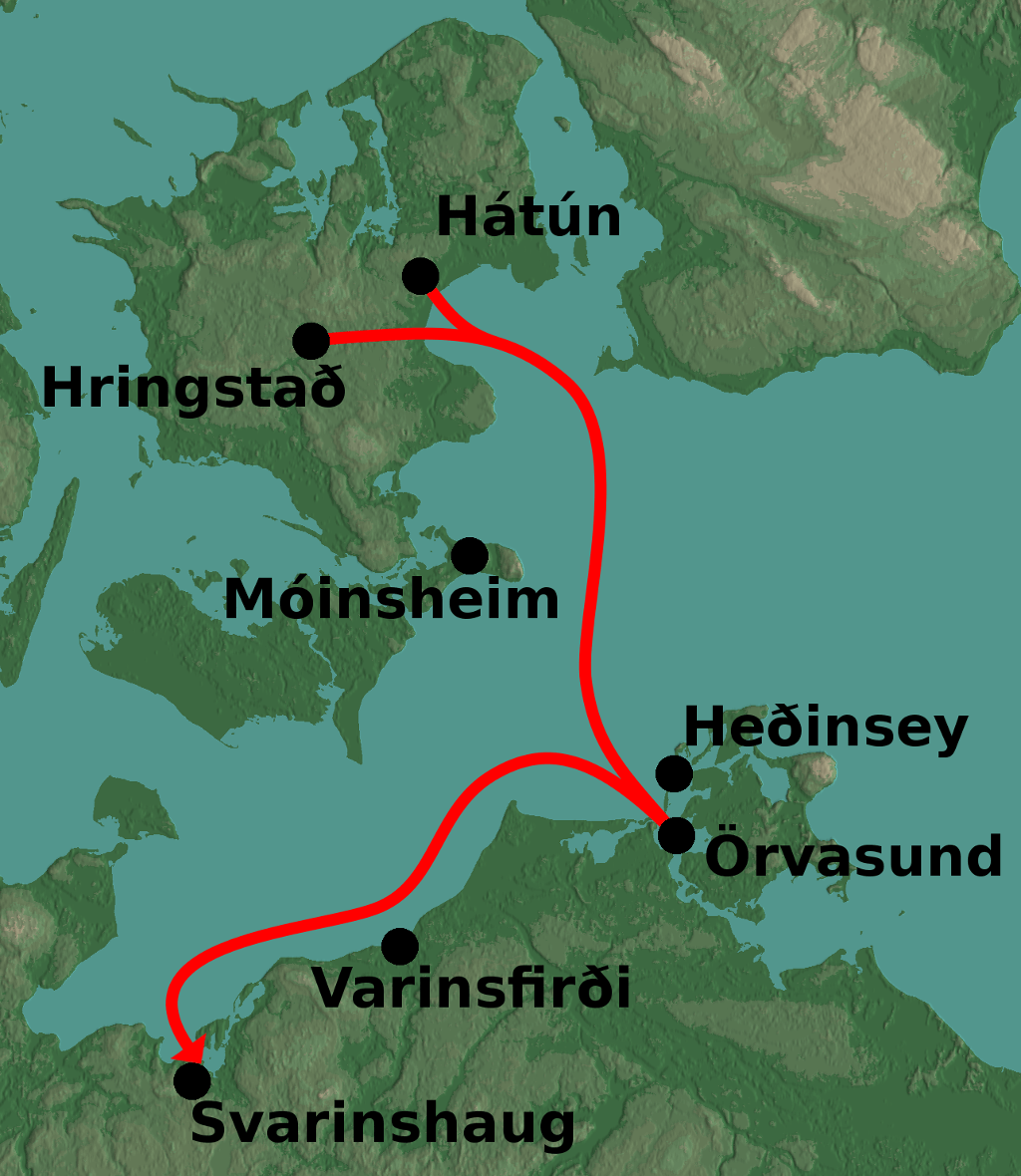
The route the Danish invasion fleet took, according to Sophus Bugge.

The Norwegian scholar Sophus Bugge argued for a Danish origin of the underlying story. He noted the similarity between the name of the primary antagonist Höðbrodd, and antagonists of the Beowulf epic, the Heaðobards. The latter are noted for fighting against the Danish Scylding Helgi, comparable to Höðbrodd's fight against Helgi. Bugge furthermore points to a number of (semi-)identifiable places in Denmark and northern Germany:

- Hringstað is elsewhere attested as the Old Norse name for Ringsted.
- Heðinsey is elsewhere attested as the Old Norse name for Hiddensee.
- Varinsfirði may point to a place near where the Warnabi or Varini used to live. Bugge identifies it with the mouth of the river Warnow.
- Svarinshaug may be connected to the Suarines and hence be nearby modern Schwerin.
- Örvasund may either be the Øresund, or a translation of Slavic Stralsund, i.e. arrow-sound.
- Móinsheim may be connected to the Danish isle of Mön.
- Adams-Bellows points out Hátún may be the village of Tune.
- Bugge connects the Sigarsvellir with the Danish town of Sigersted near Ringsted.
- Hlésey may be the Danish island of Læsø.

Bugge therefore argues the war between Helgi and Höðbrodd is a rendition of an ancient war between the Danes and Heaðobards, as a family feud. In the Helgakviða Hundingsbana I, it is said of Höðbrodd's army that

At Moinsheimar / proved the men
That hearts for the wielding / of swords they had.

— Henry Adams-Bellows,

Indeed, Mön would be a logical place for a battle between Danes and an invading Heaðobard army. Sometime after this battle, the Danes responded by sending their own invasion fleet. They assembled their fleet in the Stralsund. From there, they moved west:

[…] out of the East / have the Ylfings come,
Greedy for battle, / to Gnipalund.

— Henry Adams-Bellows,

Westwards from the Stralsund is indeed the mouth of the river Warnow, and the town of Schwerin.

== Primary sources ==
- Gesta Danorum
- Heimskringla
- Völsunga saga
- Edda

== Secondary sources ==
- Henrikson, A. Den stora mytologiska uppslagsboken, 1998.
- Nerman, B. Det svenska rikets uppkomst. Stockholm, 1925.
