= Hothbrodd =

Hothbrodd, Hodbrodd, Hothbrodus, Hodbroddus (Latin), Höddbroddr or Hǫðbroddr (Old Norse) was a legendary Norse hero and king, details of whose life appear in several related variations.

== Attestations ==
=== The Poetic Edda ===
Hǫðbroddr appears in two poems of the Poetic Edda, "Helgakviða Hundingsbana I" and "Helgakviða Hundingsbana II", both of which tell the story of the life of the Ylfing Helgi Hundingsbane.

In both tales, he is the son of King Granmar (whose kingdom is not named in these poems, but described as Södermanland in Heimskringla), and the brother of Guðmundr. However, in "Helgakviða Hundingsbana I", Hǫðbroddr is now a king in his own right, whereas in "Helgakviða Hundingsbana II" his father Granmar still rules and Hǫðbroddr is just a prince. "Helgakviða Hundingsbana II" also mentions another brother, Starkaðr.

Hǫðbroddr is betrothed to Sigrún, a valkyrie and the daughter of King Högne. However, Sigrún does not approve of the betrothal and instead flies to Helgi Hundingsbane and urges him to battle Hǫðbroddr. In "Helgakviða Hundingsbana I", she calls Hǫðbroddr as bold as a kitten, although the following stanzas also refer to him as the bane (i.e. killer) of Ísungr (otherwise unknown).

Helgi leads a large army across the sea to attack Hǫðbroddr in a bloody battle. Hǫðbroddr was supported by Högne's sons (Sigrún's brothers). With the help of valkyries, Helgi wins the battle and kills Hǫðbroddr. "Helgakviða Hundingsbana II" says that all of Granmar's sons die in the battle, and includes a description of Sigrún taunting Hǫðbroddr as he lays dying on the battlefield.

=== Volsunga saga ===
In Volsunga saga, Hodbrod appears much as he does in the Poetic Edda. He is the son of King Granmar and the betrothed of Sigrun, daughter of King Hogni. He also has a brother, called Granmar like their father (equivalent to Guðmundr in Edda).

Sigrun rejects Hodbrod and urges King Helgi to kill him. Helgi builds up an army and sets out to attack Hodbrodd, who is now king. Hodbrod gathers his own allies in defence, including Hogni, and the two forces meet at Wolfstone. Helgi kills Hodbrod under his banner, and Sigrun celebrates his death.

=== Gesta Danorum ===
In Gesta Danorum by Saxo Grammaticus, Hothbrodus (as spelled in Book 2, also called Hodbroddus in a single mention in Book 3) is the King of Sweden. He succeeds to the throne after the deaths of his father Ragnar and his mother Swanhwid, daughter of the Danish King Hadding. Hothbrodus conquered the East, massacring many peoples, and then had two sons named Athislus and Hotherus. Hothbrodus then invaded Denmark, succeeding in killing King Ro, but Ro's brother Helgi retaliated, defeating Hothbrodus' army and killing Hothbrodus himself. (Saxo's Helgi is based on both the Ylfing Helgi Hundingsbane and the Danish skjöldung king Helgi.)

The family tree of legendary Kings of the Danes, according to the Gesta Danorum (Books 1 to 7)

Kings of the Danes are marked with a crown (♕). Kings of the Swedes are marked with a dagger (†). Superscript numbers after a name indicate in which books of Gesta Danorum the individual is mentioned.

Humblus ♂ ^{(1)}
KEY
Angul ♂ ^{(1)}	♕ Dan I ♂ ^{(1)}	Grytha ♀ ^{(1)}	Marriage or coupling
Parent and child
The Angles	♕ Humblus ♂ ^{(1)}	♕ Lotherus ♂ ^{(1)}	King of the Saxons ♂ ^{(1)}	Succession by other or unclear means
Roarus ♂ ^{(1)}
Sigtrugus, King of the Swedes† ♂ ^{(1)}	♕ Skioldus ♂ ^{(1)}	Alvilda ♀ ^{(1)}
daughter of Roarus ♀ ^{(1)}	Bessus ♂ ^{(1)}
sister of Gram ♀ ^{(1)}	Gro ♀ ^{(1)}	♕ Gram† ♂ ^{(1)}	Sumblus, King of the Finns ♂ ^{(1)}
Wagnofthus ♂ ^{(1)}
Signe ♀ ^{(1)}	Henricus, King of the Saxons ♂ ^{(1)}	Haquinus, King of the Nitherians ♂ ^{(1)}
Harthgrepa ♀ ^{(1)}
♕Suibdagerus, King of Norway† ♂ ^{(1)}	sister of Guthormus ♀ ^{(1)}	♕Guthormus ♂ ^{(1)}	♕ Hadingus ♂ ^{(1,2,4,5)}	Regnilda ♀ ^{(1)}
Asmundus† ♂ ^{(1)}	Gunnilda ♀ ^{(1)}	Guthormus ♂ ^{(1)}
Ulvilda ♀ ^{(1,2)}	♕ Ubbo ♂ ^{(2)}
Henricus ♂ ^{(1)}	Uffo† ♂ ^{(1)}	Hundingus† ♂ ^{(1,2)}	Thorilda ♀ ^{(2)}	Scottus ♂ ^{(2)}
daughter of Uffo ♀ ^{(1)}	Regnerus† ♂ ^{(2)}	Suanhuita ♀ ^{(2)}	sisters of Suanhuita ♀♀ ^{(2)}	Andwan, King of the Hellespont ♂ ^{(2)}
Thoraldus ♂ ^{(2)}
♕ Frotho I ♂ ^{(2,5)}	daughter of Andwan ♀ ^{(2)}
Hothbrodus† ♂ ^{(2,3)}	♕ Haldanus I ♂ ^{(2)}	Roe ♂ ^{(2)}	Skato ♂ ^{(2)}
Thora ♀ ^{(2)}
♕ Helgo ♂ ^{(2,3)}	♕ Roe ♂ ^{(2)}
Athislus† ♂ ^{(2,3)}	Ursa ♀ ^{(2)}
King Gevarus ♂ ^{(2,3)}	♕ Rolvo Krake† ♂ ^{(2,3)}	Ruta ♀ ^{(2)}	Biarco ♂ ^{(2)}	Sculda ♀ ^{(2)}	♕ Hiarwarthus† ♂ ^{(2,3)}
♕ Hotherus† ♂ ^{(2,3)}	Nanna ♀ ^{(3)}	Herlecus ♂ ^{(3)}	Gericus ♂ ^{(3)}
former King of Britain ♂ ^{(3)}	mother of the King of Britain ♀ ^{(3)}	a slave ♂ ^{(3)}	a bondmaid ♀ ^{(3)}	♕ Roricus Slyngebond ♂ ^{(3)}	Gerwendillus ♂ ^{(3)}
King of Britain ♂ ^{(3,4)}	Queen of Britain ♀ ^{(3,4)}	Gerutha ♀ ^{(3,4)}	Horwendillus ♂ ^{(3,4)}	Fengo ♂ ^{(3,4)}
foster sister of Amlethus ♀ ^{(3,4)}	daughter of the King of Britain ♀ ^{(3,4)}	Amlethus ♂ ^{(3,4)}	Herminthruda, Queen of Scotland ♀ ^{(4)}	♕ Wiglecus ♂ ^{(4)}
son of Amlethus ♂ ^{(4)}	♕Wermundus ♂ ^{(4)}	Frowinus, governor of Sleswik ♂ ^{(4)}
♕ Uffo, aka Olavus the Gentle ♂ ^{(4)}	daughter of Frowin ♀ ^{(4)}	Keto ♂ ^{(4)}	Wigo ♂ ^{(4)}
♕ Dan II ♂ ^{(4)}
♕ Huglecus ♂ ^{(4)}
♕ Frotho II, the Vigorous ♂ ^{(4)}
♕ Dan III ♂ ^{(4)}
Craca ♀ ^{(5)}	Regnerus ♂ ^{(5)}	Bracus ♂ ^{(5)}	♕ Fridlevus I, the Swift ♂ ^{(4,5)}	Hun, King of the Huns ♂ ^{(5)}	Hun ♂ ^{(5)}
Gøtarus, King of Norway ♂ ^{(5)}	Westmarus ♂ ^{(5)}	Colo ♂ ^{(5)}	Gøtwara ♀ ^{(5)}
Rollerus ♂ ^{(5)}	Ericus the Shrewd-spoken† ♂ ^{(5,6)}	Gunwara the Fair ♀ ^{(5)}	Alvilda ♀ ^{(5)}	♕ Frotho III ♂ ^{(5,6)}	Hanunda ♀ ^{(5)}	Grep (eldest of three) ♂ ^{(5)}	11 other sons (two named Grep) ♂♂ ^{(5)}
Hythin, King of Tellemark ♂ ^{(6)}	Alvo ♂ ^{(5)}	Ofura ♀ ^{(5)}	Arngrimus ♂ ^{(5)}	Grubbus ♂ ^{(6)}	♕ Hiarnus ♂ ^{(6)}	Amundus, King of Norway ♂ ^{(6)}
child of Hythin ^{(6)}	Haldanus† ♂ ^{(6)}	12 sons, including Angantir ♂♂ ^{(5)}	Ano ♂ ^{(6)}	Iuritha ♀ ^{(6)}	♕ Fridlevus II ♂ ^{(6)}	Frogertha ♀ ^{(6)}
Hanevus, King of Saxony ♂ ^{(6)}	Suertingus, King of Saxony ♂ ^{(6)}	Olavus ♂ ^{(6)}	♕ Frotho IV ♂ ^{(6)}
Siward† ^{(6,7)}	sons of Suertingus ♂♂ ^{(6)}	sister of the sons of Suertingus ♀ ^{(6)}	♕ Ingellus ^{(6,7)}	Helga ^{(6)}	Helge ^{(6)}	Asa ^{(6)}
Frode ^{(6,7)}	Fridleif ^{(6,7)}	Ingild ^{(6,7)}	♕ Olavus I ^{(6,7)}	Karl, governor of Gothland ^{(7)}
Ulfhild ^{(7)}	♕ Frotho V ^{(7)}	Hather, a chief ^{(7)}	♕ Haraldus I ^{(7)}	Signe ^{(7)}
Erik† ^{(7)}	Thorhild ^{(7)}	♕ Haldanus II Biargramm† ^{(7)}	Harald ^{(7)}
Asmund ^{(7)}
Kings of Norway

Genealogical information is derived from Oliver Elton's 1905 translation, The First Nine Books of the Danish History of Saxo Grammaticus, via Wikisource. Name spellings are from the Latin critical edition by Olrik and Raeder (1931). Regnal numbers, which do not appear in the original text, are included for clarity and taken from the engraving Veræ effigies regum omnium by Erico Olai Tormio.

=== Gesta Danorum på danskæ ===
Gesta Danorum på danskæ is an Old Danish work based, in part on Saxo's Gesta Danorum and another Latin chronicle called the Chronicon Lethrense. In this work, Hothbrod is Höðr's father and the son of King Hadding's daughter. He had been killed by Helghe to win all of Denmark.

=== Hversu Noregr byggdist ===
In the Ættartölur (genealogies) of Hversu Noregr byggdist, Höddbroddr was the son of Höd, ruler of Haðaland. Höddbroddr was the father of Hrolf, whose line continued for five further generations. One of his descendants was Hromund Gripsson.

== Interpretation ==
Scholars such as Clive Tolley have said that the name Hothbrodd is a surviving memory of the Heaðobards, which are mentioned in the Anglo-Saxon poems Beowulf and Widsith but forgotten by the time Norse sources of the Germanic legends were written down.
