= Helgakviða Hundingsbana II =

Old Norse poem found in the Poetic Edda

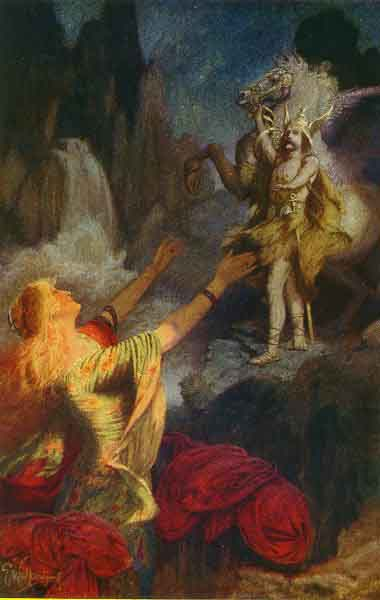
Helgi returns to Valhalla

"Völsungakviða in forna" or "Helgakviða Hundingsbana II" ("The Second Lay of Helgi Hundingsbane") is an Old Norse poem found in the Poetic Edda. It constitutes one of the Helgi lays together with Helgakviða Hundingsbana I and Helgakviða Hjörvarðssonar.

Henry Adams Bellows maintains in his commentaries that it is a patchwork of various poems that do not fit well together, but stanzas 28-37 and 39-50 are held to be among the finest in Old Norse poetry.

== The feud with Hunding and his sons ==
The first section (containing stanzas 1 to 4) introduces Helgi as the son of Sigmund, of the Ylfing and the Völsung clan, and Borghild. They resided at Brálund and they named their son after Helgi Hjörvarðsson. Their clan was in a bloody feud with Hunding and his many sons.

Helgi disguised himself and visited the home of Hunding's family where the only man present was Hunding's son Hæmingr (unknown in any other source). Hunding sent men to Helgi's foster-father Hagal to search for Helgi but Helgi hid by dressing as a female servant working with the mill.

Helgi managed to escape to a warship after which he killed Hunding and earned his name Hundingsbane.

== Helgi meets Sigrún ==
In the second section (containing stanzas 5 to 12), Helgi lay with his war party at Brunarvagar and had slaughtered some rustled cattle on the beach and were eating the meat raw. Then Sigrún, who was Sváfa reborn appeared, and introduced herself as the daughter of king Högne.

== Helgi has to challenge Hothbrodd ==
In the third section (containing stanzas 13 to 20), which is called the Old Völsung Lay, Sigrún's father had promised her to Hothbrodd, the son of king Granmarr.

Sigrún opposed the marriage and sought out Helgi, who was exhausted from a battle in which he had killed Hunding's sons Eyjólfr, Álfr, Hjörvarðr and Hávarðr. The Valkyrie embraced him and kissed him, and Helgi promised her to fight against Granmarr and his sons.

Helgi assembled an army and invaded Granmar's kingdom together with his brother Sinfjötli. They won the battle and Helgi could take Sigrún as his wife with whom he had sons.

== Sinfjötli's and Guthmund's flyting ==
A fifth section (stanzas 22 to 27) consists of a misplaced version of the flyting between Sinfjötli (Helgi's half-brother) and Guthmundr, which probably is older than the one found in Helgakviða Hundingsbana I.

== Dagr kills Helgi and is cursed by Sigrún ==
In the seventh section (containing stanzas 28-37) Sigrún's brother Dagr, who had been spared by vowing allegiance to Helgi, sacrificed to Odin in the hope of getting revenge for Helgi's slaying of his father and brothers. Odin gave Dagr a spear with which Dagr pierced Helgi at a location called Fjöturlundr. Dagr then returned to tell his sister of Helgi's death:

Trauðr em ek, systir,
trega þér at segja,
því at ek hefi nauðigr
nifti grætta;
fell í morgun
und Fjöturlundi
buðlungr, sá er var
beztr í heimi
ok hildingum
á halsi stóð.

Translation:

Sad am I, sister,
sorrow to tell thee,
Woe to my kin
unwilling I worked;
In the morn there fell
at Fjoturlund
The noblest prince
the world has known,
(And his heel he set
on the heroes' necks.)

Sigrún avenged her husband by placing on her brother the most horrible curse:

Þik skyli allir
eiðar bíta,
þeir er Helga
hafðir unna
at inu ljósa
Leiftrar vatni
ok at úrsvölum
Unnarsteini.

Skríði-at þat skip,
er und þér skríði,
þótt óskabyrr
eftir leggisk;
renni-a sá marr,
er und þér renni,
þóttú fjándr þína
forðask eigir.

Bíti-a þér þat sverð,
er þú bregðir,
nema sjalfum þér
syngvi of höfði.
Þá væri þér hefnt
Helga dauða,
ef þú værir vargr
á viðum úti
auðs andvani
ok alls gamans,
hefðir eigi mat,
nema á hræjum spryngir.

Translation:

Now may every
oath thee bite
That with Helgi
sworn thou hast,
By the water
bright of Leipt,
And the ice-cold
stone of Uth.

The ship shall sail not
in which thou sailest,
Though a favoring wind
shall follow after;
The horse shall run not
whereon thou ridest,
Though fain thou art
thy foe to flee.

The sword shall bite not
which thou bearest,
Till thy head itself
it sings about.
"Vengeance were mine
for Helgi's murder,
Wert thou a wolf
in the woods without,
Possessing nought
and knowing no joy,
Having no food
save corpses to feed on.

Dagr was banished to live on carrion in the woods and Helgi was buried in a barrow. When Helgi had entered Valhalla Odin asked Helgi to rule over the Einherjar together with himself. There is a stanza which Bellows interprets as a misplaced stanza on the conflict between Helgi and Hunding, but others interpret as Helgi oppressing Hunding in Valhalla:

Þú skalt, Hundingr,
hverjum manni
fótlaug geta
ok funa kynda,
hunda binda,
hesta gæta,
gefa svínum soð,
áðr sofa gangir.

Translation:

Thou shalt, Hunding,
of every hero
Wash the feet,
and kindle the fire,
Tie up dogs,
and tend the horses,
And feed the swine
ere to sleep thou goest.

== Helgi's last visit ==
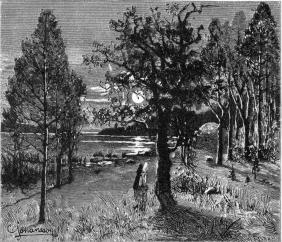
Sigrún waiting by Helgi's barrow

An eighth section (containing stanzas 39-50) deals with a short visit by Helgi from Valhalla and his meeting with Sigrún in his barrow.

One evening, a maiden told Sigrún that she has seen Helgi ride with a large retinue into his own barrow, and so Sigrún went to the barrow in order to see Helgi. His hair were covered with frost, his body is sullied with blood and his hands were wet. He explained that it was because every tear she had shed had fallen wet and cold on him. In spite of this, she prepared the bed in his mound and they spent a night together.

Before day broke, Helgi had to return to Valhalla. Sigrún returned home and spent the rest of her life waiting in vain for Helgi to return to his barrow one more time. She died early from the sorrow, but she would meet him in the next life when she was the Valkyrie Kára and he was Helgi Haddingjaskati.
