= Kára =

Valkyrie

In Norse mythology, Kára is a valkyrie, attested in the prose epilogue of the Poetic Edda poem Helgakviða Hundingsbana II.

The epilogue details that "there was a belief in the pagan religion, which we now reckon an old wives' tale, that people could be reincarnated," and that the deceased valkyrie Sigrún and her dead love Helgi Hundingsbane were considered to have been reborn as another Helgi and valkyrie couple; Helgi as Helgi Haddingjaskati and Sigrún as the daughter of Halfdan—the valkyrie Kára. According to the epilogue, further information about the two can be found in the work Káruljóð, which has not survived.

The name Kára either means "the wild, stormy one" (based on Old Norse afkárr, meaning "wild") or "curl" or "the curly one" (from Old Norse kárr). Otto Höfler theorizes a connection between the "curl" etymology and the Odinic cult name Odinkar that appears in runic inscriptions, which means "the one with the (long?) Odin's curls."
