= Helgi Haddingjaskati =

Helgi Haddingjaskati (Old Norse: [ˈhelɡe ˈhɑdːeŋɡjɑˌskɑte], meaning "Helgi the lord of the Haddingjar") was a legendary Norse hero of whom only fragmentary accounts survive.

It is said in the end section of Helgakviða Hundingsbana II, a poem of the Poetic Edda, that the hero Helgi Hundingsbane and his lover Sigrún were reincarnated as Helgi Haddingjaskati and the valkyrie Kára, Halfdan's daughter, who were the protagonists of the Káruljóð.

Káruljóð is lost, but a part of the adventures of Helgi and Kára are held to survive in the legendary saga Hrómundar saga Gripssonar. In this legend, Helgi Haddingjaskati is the champion of two Swedish kings named Haldingr. Helgi fights against the protagonist of the saga, who is named Hrómundr, but Helgi is aided in the battle by his lover Kára's magic. During the battle, she is in the shape of a swan, but by mistake Helgi hurts the swan with his sword and is no longer protected by her magic. He is then killed by Hrómundr.

A last fragmentary reference to a skati Haddingja, a "ruler of the Haddings", appears in Kálfsvísa, a part of Snorri Sturluson's Skáldskaparmál:

Dagr reið Drösli, en Dvalinn Móðni, Hjalmr Háfeta, en Haki Fáki, reið bani Belja Blóðughófa, en Skævaði skati Haddingja.	Dagr rode Drösull ("Roamer"), And Dvalinn rode Módnir ("Spirited"); Hjálmthér, Háfeti ("High-Heels"); Haki rode Fákr; The Slayer of Beli Rode Blódughófi, And Skævadr was ridden By the Ruler of Haddings.
