= Sigrún =

Valkyrie in Norse mythology

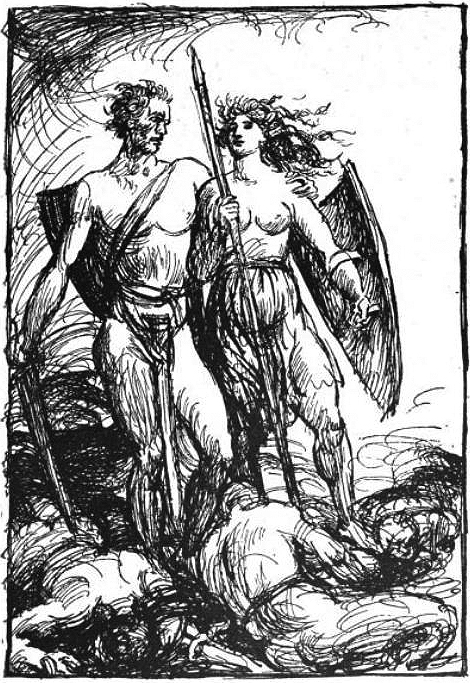
A depiction of Sigrún with Helgi Hundingsbane (1919) by Robert Engels.

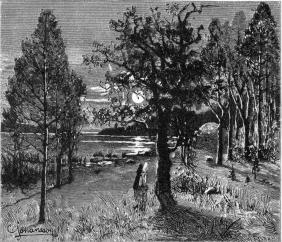
Sigrun waiting by Helgi's barrow

Sigrún (Old Norse "victory rune") is a valkyrie in Norse mythology. Her story is related in Helgakviða Hundingsbana I and Helgakviða Hundingsbana II, in the Poetic Edda. The original editor annotated that she was Sváfa reborn.

The hero Helgi Hundingsbane first meets her when she leads a band of nine Valkyries:

15. Þá brá ljóma; af Logafjöllum, en af þeim ljómum leiftrir kómu, -- -- -- hávar und hjalmum á Himinvanga, brynjur váru þeira blóði stokknar, en af geirum geislar stóðu.	15. Then glittered light; from Logafjoll, And from the light the flashes leaped; - High under helms on heaven's field; Their byrnies all with blood were red, And from their spears the sparks flew forth.

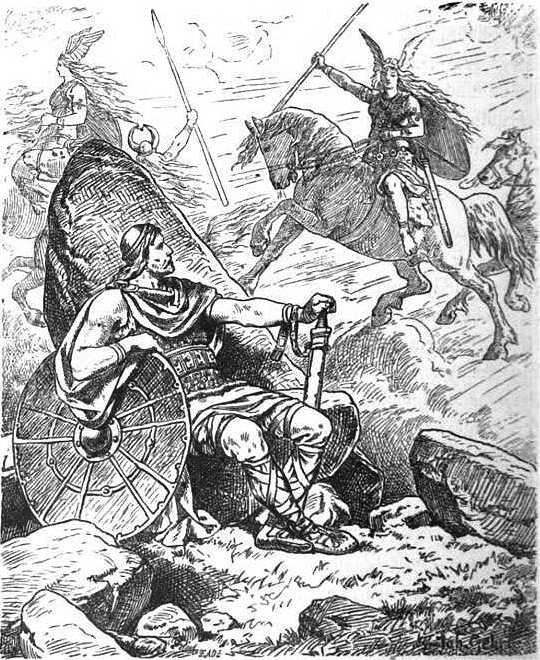
"Helgi and Sigrun" (1901) by Johannes Gehrts.

The two fall in love, and Sigrún tells Helgi that her father Högni has promised her to Höðbroddr, the son of king Granmarr. Helgi invades Granmar's kingdom and slays anyone opposing their relationship. Only Sigrún's brother Dagr is left alive on condition that he swears fealty to Helgi.

Dagr is however obliged by honour to avenge his brothers and after having summoned Odin, the god gives him a spear. In a place called Fjoturlund, Dagr kills Helgi and goes back to his sister to tell her of his deed. Sigrún puts Dagr under a powerful curse after which he is obliged to live on carrion in the woods.

Helgi is put in a barrow, but returns from Valhalla one last time so that the two can spend a night together.

Sigrún dies early from sadness, but is reborn as a Valkyrie. In the next life, she is Kára and Helgi is Helgi Haddingjaskati, whose story is related in Hrómundar saga Gripssonar.

== Modern influence ==
Sigrún appeared in the 2018 video game God of War, in which she is the Valkyrie Queen. She can be fought by the player after defeating eight other Valkyries. Her fight is considered to be one of the most difficult and demanding encounters in the franchise.

In 2022, she also appeared in God of War Ragnarök, but this time as an ally of Kratos, Freya, Mimir, Atreus, along with the shield maidens — her sisters. She and the other eight Valkyries are now free of the corruption spells of Odin thanks to the events which happened in God of War.

In the series The Dresden Files, Sigrun, more commonly referred to as "Gard", is a warrior in the service of Monoc Securities, headed by Donar Vadderung. Vadderung is a being who is also Odin and Santa Claus.

Sigrun is featured in the 2024 book verse play Sigrun & the Mist, written by occult author Jack Grayle. Sigrun is portrayed by model Klara Wolfe.
