= Brávellir =

Plain in Norse mythology

Brávellir (Old Norse) or Bråvalla (modern Swedish) (58°35′N 16°25′E) was the name of the central plain of Östergötland (East Götaland), in Norse mythology.

It appears in several traditions, such as those of the Battle of Bråvalla (Battle of the Bravellir), and in Helgakviða Hundingsbana I, where Sinfjötli resides on this plain. Stanza 42:

Sinfiotli qvaþ: «Þv vart brvþr Grana a Bravelli, gvllbitlvþ vart gor til rasar; hafda ec þer moþri mart sceiþ riþit, svangri vnd sa/þli, simvl! forbergis.	Sinfjotli quoth: "You were the bride of Grani the horse you were at Brávellir; harnessed with a golden bridle, and you were ready to run; I have ridden you tired downhill quite often, slim, as you were, under the saddle you fool!"

Its location has been contested because a local tradition places the Battle of Bråvalla at lake Åsnen in the Swedish province of Småland. In the oldest sources, however, such as the Hervarar saga it is described as Brávelli í eystra Gautlandi (i.e. Bråvalla in Östergötland) and in Sögubrot af nokkrum fornkonungum the battle is said to have taken place south of Kolmården which separated Sweden from Östergötland and where Bråviken is located: ..Kolmerkr, er skilr Svíþjóð ok Eystra-Gautland ... sem heitir Brávík.

In the legend of Blenda, the army of women assembled on the Brávellir.
