= Granmar =

Mythological king of Sweden

Granmar was a king of Södermanland, in Snorri Sturluson's Heimskringla. The same king also appears in the Volsunga saga and is mentioned in two poems of the Poetic Edda: "Helgakviða Hundingsbana I" and "Helgakviða Hundingsbana II".

Granmar was married to Hilda, the daughter of the Geatish king Högne of East Götaland, and his son-in-law was the seaking Hjörvard of the Ylfings as he was married to Hildagun. These three kings defended themselves against the Swedish king Ingjald Ill-ruler.

According to the Heimskringla, he had no sons, but the legends of Helgi Hundingsbane relate that he had the sons Hothbrodd, Gudmund and Starkad who were slain by Helgi.

Snorri relates that when the Swedish king Ingjald ill-ruler invited seven petty kings in order to burn them all to death inside his hall, Granmar did not arrive and so he escaped being murdered.

The same summer, the Sea-king Hjörvard of the Ylfings arrived at Myrkva Fjord (Mörköfjärden, an inlet that is still used to pass between Mälaren and the Baltic Sea and divides Södermanland in two parts). Hjörvard was invited to a feast with Granmar and he agreed as he had never pillaged in the area before. He was gladly welcomed and the kings sat with one woman each as was the custom, while the others formed a single group. Hjörvard's Vikings did not like that as it was their law that everyone at a feast should drink together. Hjörvard then sat in a high seat opposing Granmar and his men sat on the same bench as him.

Granmar's daughter Hildigunn, who was very beautiful, was told by her father to serve beer to the men. She took a silver goblet, filled it and bowed to Hjörvard, telling him success to all Ylfings, this cup is to the memory of Hrólf Kraki drank half of it and offered the rest to Hjörvard. He drank it, took her hand and asked her to sit beside him. She answered that it was not Viking custom, but he asked her not to mind. This evening they drank and talked a great deal with each other, and the next day, as he was leaving, Hjörvard asked for her hand. Granmar asked his wife, Queen Hilda and the people he respected, telling them to trust Hjörvard. They all agreed. There was a wedding and as Granmar had no sons, Hjörvard stayed to help Granmar defend his kingdom.

In the autumn, Ingjald assembled his forces in order to attack Södermanland. However, when Granmar and Hjörvard heard this they did the same thing and allied with Granmar's father-in-law Högne, the king of East Götaland, and his son Hildur.

Ingjald invaded Södermanland with superior forces, and a battle commenced. After some ferocious fighting, the chiefs of Fjärdhundraland, West Götaland, Nerike and Attundaland began to flee from the battle in their ships. Ingjald was severely wounded and Svipdag the Blind and his sons Gautvid and Hylvid fell. Ingjald retreated and returned to Uppsala and realised that the forces he had gained from the conquered petty kingdoms were not faithful to him.

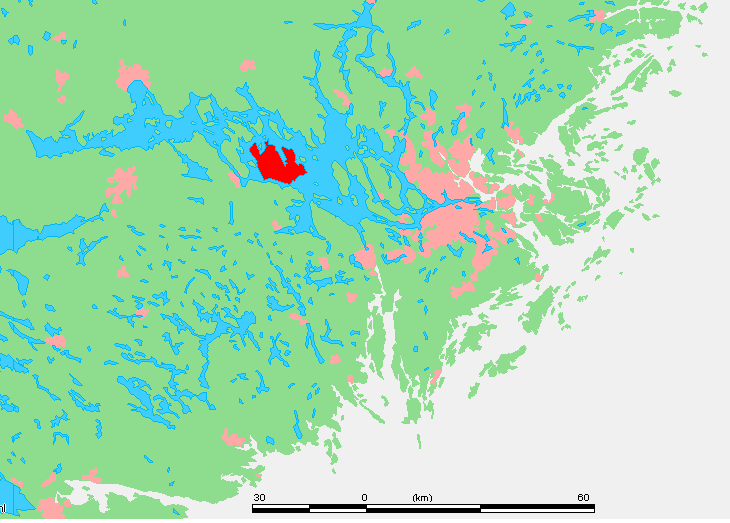
Selaön

After a long standstill, some friends of both sides wanted to bring about a reconciliation. Ingjald had a meeting with Granmar and Hjörvard and they decided to have peace for as long as the three men lived. The following spring, Granmar was travelling to Uppsala to confirm the peace between him and Ingjald, but he realised that Ingjald had not promised him a long life and so he returned.

The next autumn, King Granmar and Hjörvard were at a feast in one of their farms on the island Selaön. During the night, they were surrounded by Ingjald and his men and the hall was set on fire burning everyone inside to death. Ingjald then installed chiefs to rule Södermanland.

King Högne of East Götaland and his son Hildur often made raids into the Swedish provinces killing many of Ingjald's men. Högne defended his kingdom successfully until he died.

King Hogne was reported to be killed with a son Bragi by Helgi the Ylfing from the legends of Helgi Hundingsbane and his daughter taken by Helgi as a wife. The sons of Granmer unnamed by Snorri were also killed by Helgi as Snorri relates he only had a daughter. This could be true if they were killed before Hildagun married Hjörvard the Ylfing. This suggests he was involved in a civil war with Hogne, Granmer, and Hjörvard, and him possibly being allied with Ingjald who was reported to kill Granmer and Hjörvard. Helgi was later killed by Dag another son of Hogne unnamed by Snorri.

Dag could be Hildur as Bragi was killed by Helgi, this is unclear. More unclear is Hothbrod trying to marry Sigrun daughter of Hogne, as Granmer was married to Hilda daughter of Hogne. This would make Sigrun his aunt. More likely, Helgi killed Granmers sons as rivals to his own claim and possibly took his wife Hilda Ylfing as a price after the death of Granmer and Hjörvard by his ally Injald. This would mean Sigrun was the same person as Helgi and at least makes sense. What is known for sure is that Hjörmund reclaimed the throne later. Sögubrot relates that Ivar Vidfamne gave the East Geatish throne to Hjörmund, the son of Hjörvard, after Ingjald's death since it had been the kingdom of Hjörmund's father Hjörvard. Ivar Vidfamne was supposedly great grandson of Valder himself a son of Hrothgar and his Ulfing wife Wealhþēow. Making Hjörmund his kin and Ivar Vidfamne indebted to the Ulfings for protecting Hrothgars kingly line.
