= Högne =

King in Norse mythology

Högne was a king of Östergötland who appears in sources of Norse mythology.

== Heimskringla ==
Snorri Sturluson wrote that he was the king of Östergötland and that he had a son named Hildur and daughter Hilda who was married to Granmar, the king of Södermanland. When Ingjald Ill-ruler murdered most of the sub-kings of Sweden, Högne and Granmar successfully defended their kingdoms. Snorri states that Högne and his son Hildur often made raids into the Swedish provinces killing many of Ingjald's men, and that he ruled his kingdom until he died.

== Volsunga saga ==
In the Volsunga saga, the kings Högne and Granmar also appear. In this saga, Högne has a daughter Sigrun who he had promised to Granmar's son Hothbrodd. However, Sigrun has a suitor, Helgi Hundingsbane who attacks Granmar. Högne's forces joined Hothbrodd, but Helgi was victorious and Hothbrodd slain. Afterwards, Helgi married Sigrun.

== The Poetic Edda ==
Högne appears in two poems of the Poetic Edda, "Helgakviða Hundingsbana I" and "Helgakviða Hundingsbana II", which tell a similar story to his appearance in Volsunga saga. However, the poems are more detailed. "Helgakviða Hundingsbana II" says that Högne has two sons, named Bragi and Dagr, and a brother named Sigarr. Bragi and Högne himself are killed by Helgi in the battle with Hǫðbroddr, but Dagr is spared when he surrenders and swears oaths to Helgi. Sigrún, Högne's daughter who had initiated the slaughter (here also depicted as a valkyrie), weeps over her family's deaths, but then marries Helgi. Later, Dagr prays to Odin to avenge Högne his father, and kills Helgi with a spear that Odin grants him.
