= Sváfa =

Valkyrie in Norse mythology

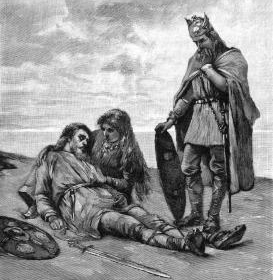
Helgi, Sváfa and Heðinn. An illustration from Fredrik Sander's 1893 Swedish edition of the Poetic Edda

In Norse mythology, Sváfa or Sváva is a valkyrie and the daughter of king Eylimi. Consequently, she was probably the maternal aunt of Sigurd, the dragon slayer, although this is not explicitly mentioned in Helgakviða Hjörvarðssonar where Sváfa's story appears.

== Etymology ==
The etymology of the valkyrie's name has been theorized as meaning "sleep-maker" or as "Suebian", and it may not be a coincidence that a king Sváfnir and the kingdom Sváfaland also appears in this poem (it is also mentioned in the Þiðrekssaga), although they are never directly connected with her.

== Helgakviða Hjörvarðssonar ==
The Norwegian king Hjörvarðr and Sigrlinn of Sváfaland had a son who was a silent man and to whom no name could be given. When this silent man had grown up, he was one day sitting on a hill, and he saw nine Valkyries riding of whom Sváfa was the most beautiful one.

Sváfa called him Helgi and asked him if he wanted a gift with his newly-given name (which was customary), but Helgi wanted nothing if he could not have Sváfa herself. She then informed him of the location of a great sword engraved with snakes and magic runes. Sváfa had given Helgi his name and during his battles, she was always there for him, shielding him from danger.

After having won fame in battle, Helgi went to king Eylimi and asked the king for his daughter's hand. King Eylimi consented and so Helgi and Sváfa exchanged their vows. Although they were married, she remained with her father while Helgi was out doing battle.

King Hróðmar's son Álfr wanted to avenge his father and had challenged Helgi to a holmgang at Sigarsvoll. During the holmgang with Álfr, Helgi received a mortal wound due to a troll woman's curse and Álfr won. Helgi then sent his companion Sigarr to king Eylimi in order to fetch Sváfa so that they could meet before he died.

Before dying, Helgi asked Sváfa to marry his brother Heðinn. The brother asked Sváfa to kiss him, because she would not see him again before Helgi had been avenged. Both Helgi and Sváfa would be reborn as Helgi Hundingsbane and Sigrún and so their adventures continued.
