= Signy =

Characters and heroines in several old Scandinavian sagas

- Norse mythology character
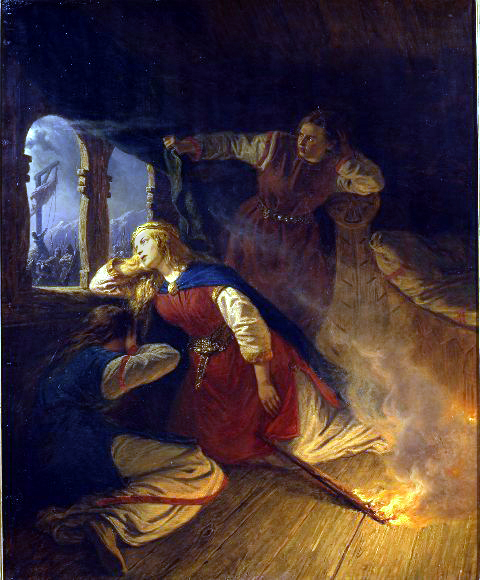
- Signy and Hagbard

In-universe information
- Gender: Female
- Spouse: Siggeir
- Children: Sinfjötli
- Relatives: King Völsung

Signy or Signe (Old Norse: Signý, sometimes known as German: Sieglinde) is the name of two heroines in two connected legends from Norse mythology which were very popular in medieval Scandinavia. Both appear in the Völsunga saga, which was adapted into other works such as Wagner's 'Ring' cycle, including its famous opera Die Walküre. Signy is also the name of two characters in several other sagas.

The first Signy is the daughter of King Völsung. She was married to the villainous Geatish king Siggeir who has her whole family treacherously murdered, except for her brother Sigmund. She saves her brother, has an incestuous affair with him and bears the son Sinfjötli. She burnt herself to death with her hated husband.

The second Signy is the daughter of King Siggeir's nephew Sigar. She fell in love with the Sea-King Hagbard, and promised him that she would not live if he died. They were discovered and Hagbard was sentenced to be hanged. Hagbard managed to signal this to Signy who set her house on fire and died in the flames whereupon Hagbard hanged himself in the gallows. See Hagbard and Signy.

A third Signy is the daughter of a witch named Grid in Illuga saga Gríðarfóstra. They are both delivered from a curse by a young man named Illugi.

A fourth Signy was Hroðgar's sister in Skjöldunga saga and Hrólfs saga kraka. She is unnamed in Beowulf.

== In Völsunga saga ==
Signy was the only daughter of King Völsung of Hunaland and Hljod the giantess. She and her twin brother Sigmund were the oldest of Volsung's eleven children. Signy reluctantly married King Siggeir of Gautland after he asked King Volsung for her hand. It was at their wedding feast that Sigmund drew the sword Gram from Barnstokkr.

Three months after her wedding, Signy's father and brothers visited her at her new home in Gautland. Signy warned them of her husband's plan to betray them. Despite her warning, Volsung is killed and all of Signy's brothers are captured. At Signy's request, her brothers are put in the stocks rather than executed, but each night one was killed by a she-wolf. When only Sigmund was left alive, Signy sent a man to smear honey on his face and mouth, which the wolf only licked, allowing Sigmund to escape alive. Signy then helped her brother to hide in the woods.

Signy wanted nothing but to see her father's death avenged. She sent her elder son to Sigmund for him to help in this endeavor. When Sigmund revealed to her that he was unworthy, Signy told Sigmund to kill him, which he did. The same happened with her younger son.

Signy met a sorceress with whom she exchanged shapes. Signy, looking like the sorceress, went to her brother in the woods and slept with him for three nights. She then returned to the castle and regained her appearance. After a time she gave birth to a son Sinfjötli. He was also sent to her brother in the forest when he was nine years old. Sigmund and Sinfjötli kill Siggeir to avenge the death of their father/grandfather together. It is only after this that Signy informs Sigmund of the incest that led to Sinfjötli's birth. Signy then walks into the fire that is killing her husband, announcing, "In everything I have worked toward the killing of King Siggeir. I have worked so hard to bring about vengeance that I am by no means fit to live. Willingly I will now die with King Siggeir, although I married him reluctantly."
