= Sinfjötli =

Character in Norse mythology

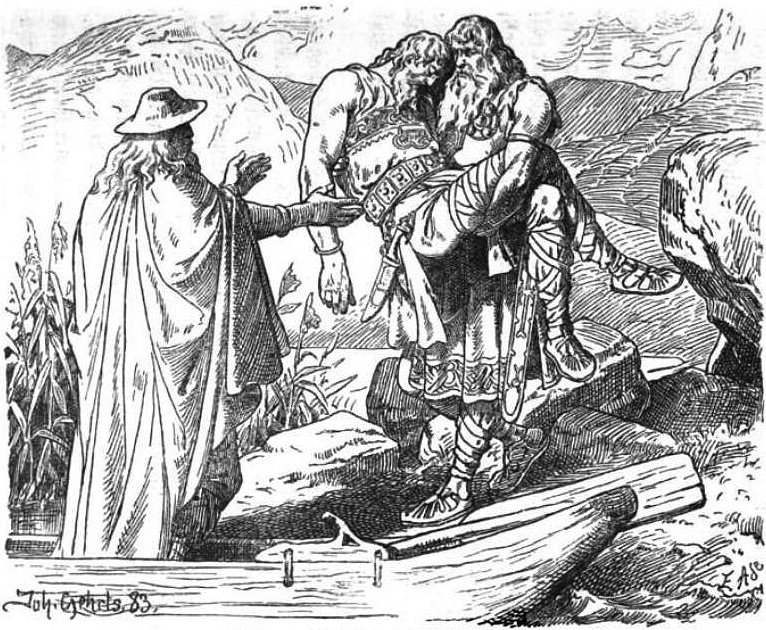
"Odin takes the corpse of Sinfjötli" (1883) by Johannes Gehrts.

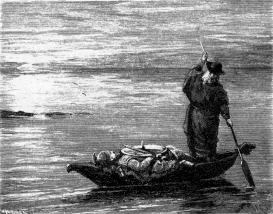
Odin taking the dead Sinfjǫtli to Valhalla

Sinfjötli (Old Norse: Sinfjǫtli [ˈsinˌfjɔtli]) or Fitela (in Old English) in Norse mythology was born out of the incestuous relationship between Sigmund and his sister Signy. He had the half-brothers Sigurd, Helgi Hundingsbane and Hamund.

== Etymology and orthography ==
Sinfjǫtli is formed from two parts, sin-, and fjǫtli. The latter is cognate with the Old English Fitela. In the standardized Old Norse orthography, the name is spelled Sinfjǫtli, but the letter 'ǫ' is frequently replaced with the Modern Icelandic ö for reasons of familiarity or technical expediency.

== Life ==
In Beowulf, Fitela is the nephew of Sigmund, whereas the Völsunga saga describes him as both Sigmund's son and nephew due to incest.

In the Völsunga saga, Sinfjǫtli is the grandson of King Völsung. Signý, King Völsung's daughter, despises her husband King Siggeir, and begs "that she may not be made to return to King Siggeir." Völsung denies her request to leave, reminding her of the commitment their family must maintain. Despite a warning from Signý, King Völsung and his 10 sons engage in a battle as King Siggeir's unbeatable army treacherously murders King Völsung. Signý pleads with her husband not to dispose of her 10 brothers, but rather Siggeir grants her request "because [he thinks] it better that they suffer more and are tortured longer before they die."

Through 9 long nights, a returning she-wolf (thought to be King Siggeir's mother) kills 9 of Signý's brothers in turn. A message is passed to the last brother remaining, Sigmund, to smear honey on his face and bite the tongue out of the she-wolf's mouth, thus killing her and saving himself. Since Sigmund has lost his father and brothers, Signý wishes to support him in avenging their family by sending her son to be his companion in his hideout in the forest. However, each of her sons by King Siggeir proves cowardly: they cannot withstand the pain of having the cuffs of their kirtles sewn to their skin. So Signý has Sigmund kill them as they are no longer of any use. Sigmund being of the Völsung line, Signý believes her brother will produce a son worthy of claiming a place in that line, and one night she "exchange[s] shape" with a völva, goes to Sigmund in his underground dwelling, and spends three nights in his bed with Sigmund unaware that she is his sister in another form. Very unlike her previous sons born of the devious and unpleasant King Siggeir, Signý then bears a son who is no less strong, handsome, and fearless than Völsung himself. This is Sinfjǫtli, who together with Sigmund will avenge their clan by killing Siggeir. Sinfjǫtli ignores the pain, saying that "such pain would seem trifling to Völsung." The incestuous product of the coalesced Völsung line, he is capable of the great deeds Signý requires.

In their wanderings, before killing Siggeir, he and Sigmund come across men sleeping in cursed wolves' skins. By killing the men and donning the wolf skins, they are cursed with a type of lycanthropy.

Sigmund and Sinfjǫtli go to Hunaland where Sigmund is proclaimed king of the Huns. He marries Borghild and has the sons Helgi Hundingsbane and Hámundr. Sinfjötli slays Borghild's brother while vying for a woman both the brother and Sinfjǫtli want. Borghild avenges her brother by poisoning Sinfjötli. In order to dispose of him, Borghild gives Sigmund three cups of wine, of which the last contains poison. Sigmund, suspecting Borghild, drinks two of the cups, but inebriated, encourages Sinfjǫtli to drink the third, which he does, and subsequently dies.

Sigmund brings his son's corpse to the fjords, where he meets Odin disguised as a ferryman. The ferryman says that he can only take one passenger at a time and takes Sinfjǫtli's body first. Out on the water, he and Sinfjǫtli disappear.

Sigmund goes home and banishes Borghild. This is roughly the tale told in J.R.R. Tolkien's The Legend of Sigurd and Gudrún.

In the First Lay of Helgi Hundingsbane, from the Poetic Edda, Gudmund accuses Sinfjǫtli of being a werewolf.
