= Sigmund =

Mythological figure

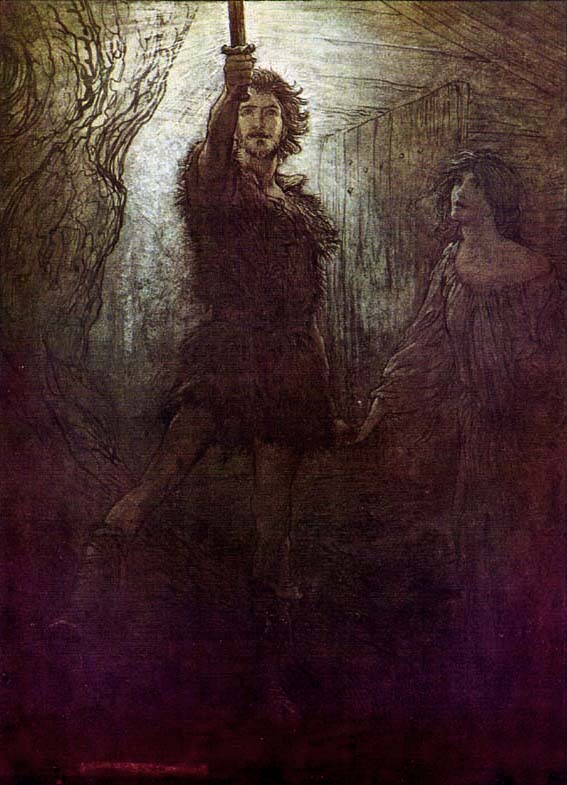
A depiction of Sigmund by Arthur Rackham.

In Germanic mythology, Sigmund (Old Norse: Sigmundr [ˈsiɣˌmundz̠], Old English: Sigemund) is a hero whose story is told in the Völsunga saga. He and his sister, Signý, are the children of Völsung and his wife Hljod. Sigmund is best known as the father of Sigurð the dragon-slayer, though Sigurð's tale has almost no connections to the Völsung cycle except that he was a dragonslayer.

== Völsunga saga ==
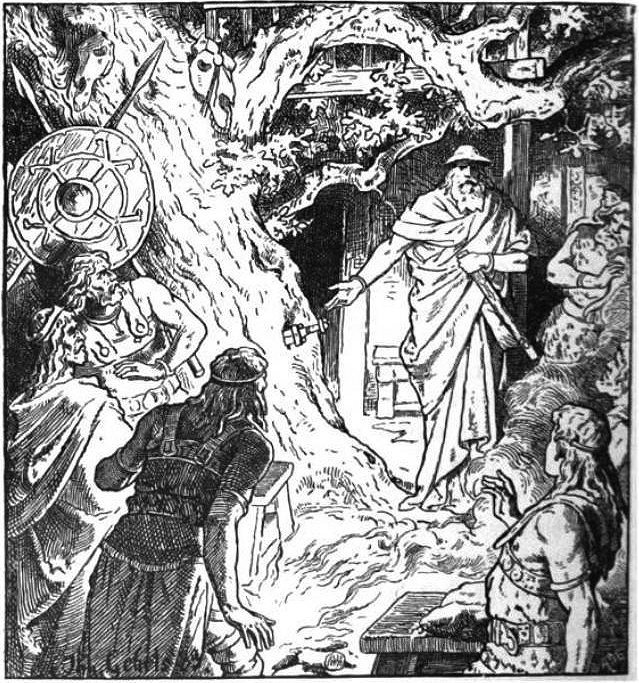
"Sigmund's Sword" (1889) by Johannes Gehrts.

In the Völsunga saga, Signý marries Siggeir, the king of Gautland (modern Västergötland). Völsung and Sigmund are attending the wedding feast (which lasted for some time before and after the marriage), when Odin, disguised as a beggar, plunges a sword (Gram) into the living tree Barnstokk ("offspring-trunk") around which Völsung's hall is built. The disguised Odin announces that the man who can remove the sword will have it as a gift. Only Sigmund is able to free the sword from the tree.

Siggeir is smitten with envy and desire for the sword. He tries to buy it but Sigmund refuses. Siggeir invites Sigmund, his father Völsung and Sigmund's nine brothers to visit him in Gautland to see the newlyweds three months later. When the Völsung clan arrive, they are attacked by the Gauts; King Völsung is killed and his sons captured. Signý beseeches her husband to spare her brothers and to put them in stocks instead of killing them. As Siggeir thinks that the brothers deserve to be tortured before they are killed, he agrees.

He then lets his shapeshifting mother turn into a wolf and devour one of the brothers each night. During that time, Signý tries various ruses but fails every time until only Sigmund remains. On the ninth night, she has a servant smear honey on Sigmund's face and when the she-wolf arrives, she starts licking the honey off and sticks her tongue into Sigmund's mouth, whereupon Sigmund bites her tongue off, killing her. Sigmund then escapes his bonds and hides in the forest.

Signý brings Sigmund everything he needs. Bent on revenge for their father's death, she also sends her sons to him in the wilderness, one by one, to be tested. As each fails, she urges Sigmund to kill them, until one day when he refuses to continue killing innocent children. Finally, in despair, she comes to him in the guise of a völva and conceives a child by him, Sinfjötli (named Fitela in Beowulf). Sinfjötli, born of their incest, passes the test.

Sigmund and his son/nephew, Sinfjötli, grow wealthy as outlaws. In their wanderings, they come upon men sleeping in cursed wolf skins. Upon killing the men and putting on the wolf skins, they are cursed with a type of lycanthropy. Eventually, they avenge the death of Völsung.

After Signý dies, Sigmund and Sinfjötli go harrying together. Sigmund marries a woman named Borghild and has two sons, one of them named Helgi. Sinfjötli slays Borghild's brother while vying for a woman they both want. Borghild avenges her brother by poisoning Sinfjötli.

Later, Sigmund marries a woman named Hjördís. After a short time of peace, Sigmund's lands are attacked by King Lyngi. In battle, Sigmund matches up against an old man who is Odin in disguise. Odin shatters Sigmund's sword, and Sigmund falls at the hands of others. Dying, he tells Hjördís that she is pregnant and that her son will one day make a great weapon out of the fragments of his sword. That son was to be Sigurd, who avenged his father by carving a blood eagle on Lyngvi's back. Sigurd himself had a son named Sigmund, who was killed when he was three-years-old by a vengeful Brynhild.

== Beowulf ==
The Wælsing, Sigemund is a character in a story within a story found in the Anglo-Saxon epic poem Beowulf. The earliest form of the Germanic dragonslayer story, the story includes Sigemund slaying an unnamed wyrm guarding a hoard of treasure, foreshadowing the hoard-guarding dragon found later in the poem. The Old Norse word Volsungr appears as a 'back-formation' from Wælsing.

Sigemund and his story appear in lines 874-900, with the tale being shared in the form of a song sung in Heorot, the mead hall of Hrothgar, following the slaying of Grendel, with mention of Sigemund’s prior slaughter of eoten (Jötunn) alongside his nephew, Fitela. In the tale, Sigemund slays the worm with a sword and takes its trove of treasure, hauling it away by ship while the dragon melts. The tale ends with praise to Sigemund as a hero and mentions Heremod, a legendary Danish king.

The dragon is often associated with Fáfnir, though the Beowulf episode differs from the Old Norse version as found in the Fáfnismál and Völsunga saga, where the monster is slain by Sigurd, not Sigmund. This difference is interpreted by scholars as either a mistake by the anonymous Beowulf poet, or a suggestion of parallel traditions regarding the dragonslayer story. German philologist Gustav Neckel speculates that the Beowulf version of the story derives from a Frankish pagan lay, historically linked to Sigismund of Burgundy, finally localized and mythologized once it reached Scandinavia.

== Relation to other Germanic heroes ==
Sigmund/Siegmund is also the name of Sigurd/Siegfried's father in other versions of the Sigurd story, but without any of the details about his life or family that appear in Norse Völsung tales and poems.

== Parallels ==
Parallels to Sigmund's pulling the sword from the tree can be found in other mythologies (notably in the Arthurian legends). Also, Sinfjötli and Mordred share the characteristic of being nephew and son to the main characters. The gaining of mythical powers through a sword is also similar to the Norse god Frey.

== In modern fiction ==
Siegmund is a character in Richard Wagner's music drama Die Walküre, part of the larger Ring cycle, which tells the story of an incestuous romance between Siegmund and his sister Sieglinde, who have a son named Siegfried. In this story, Wotan (Odin) breaks Siegmund's sword Nothung with his spear, and Siegfried later reforges the broken sword.

The story of Sigmund, beginning with the marriage of Signy to Siggeir and ending with Sigmund's vengeance on Siggeir, was retold in the novelette "Vengeance" by Arthur Gilchrist Brodeur, which appeared in the magazine Adventure, June 30, 1925. Brodeur was a professor at Berkeley and became well known for his scholarship on Beowulf and Norse sagas.

== See also ==
- Simonside Hills
