= Borghild =

Female figure of Norse myth

In Norse mythology, Borghild was the first wife of Sigmund. They had two sons, Hamund and Helgi.

== Völsunga saga ==
Sinfjötli (Borghild's step-son) "saw a lovely woman and strongly desired to have her. The brother of Borghild, the wife of King Sigmund, had also asked for her hand.". Sinfjötli killed the brother in a contest to win the maiden's hand, and Sinfjötli won. He became very famous. When he came home, he told his father Sigmund what had happened. Sigmund then told Borghild, and Borghild wanted Sinfjötli to leave the kingdom for killing her brother. Sigmund defended Sinfjötli, but offered to pay Borghild compensation. This was a generous offer, similar to Hrafnkel's offer to Thorbjorn for the death of Einar in Hrafnkels saga. Borghild, however, was not placated by this and said "You shall decide, sir, as is fitting.".

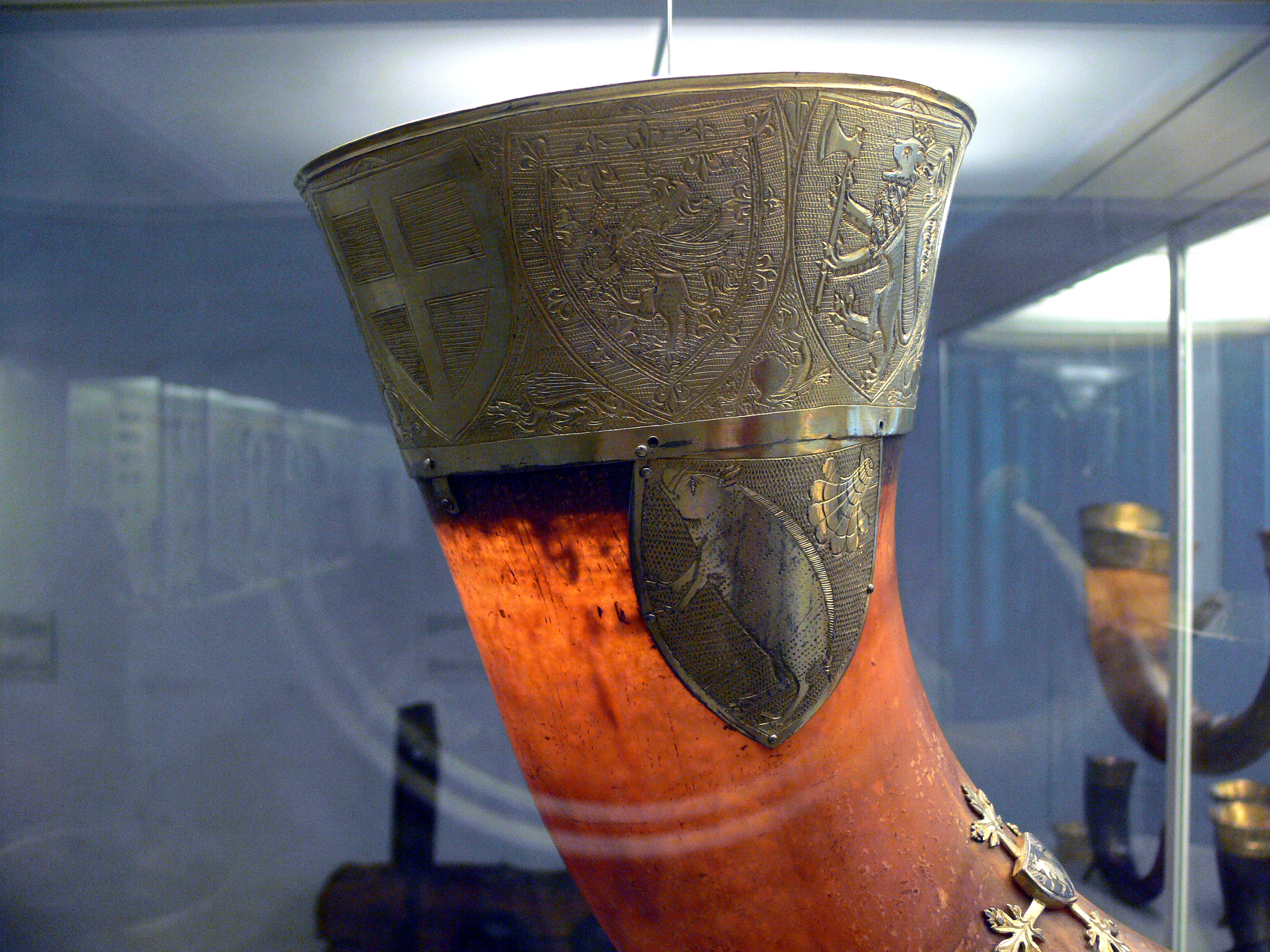
Drinking horn

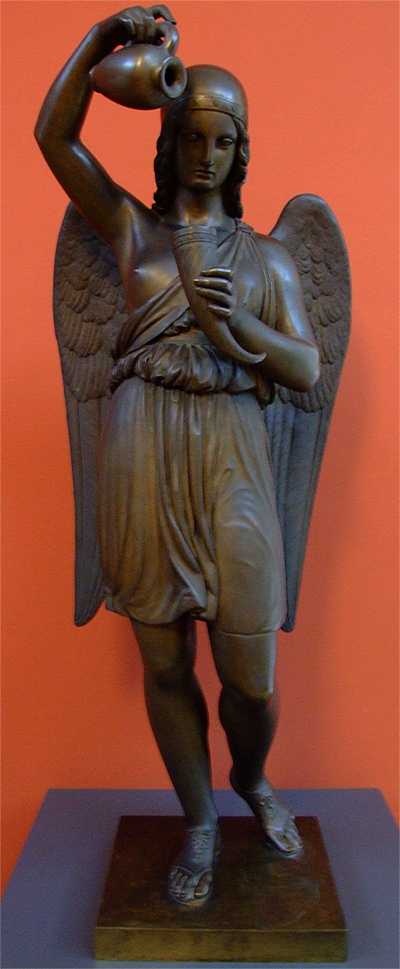
Valkyrie by H. W. Bissen

Borghild then arranged a funeral feast for her brother, and she served the drink.

Serving the drink was characteristic of the shieldmaiden in the stories about Valhalla. She tells Sinfjötli to drink, but he says it is poisoned, and Sigmund takes it instead. Borghild makes fun of Sinfjötli saying, "Why should other men drink ale for you?". She then orders him to drink a second time, but Sinfjötli won't and Sigmund drinks it again. Borghild dares him a third time, saying that he should "drain it, if he had the heart of a Volsung.". Sigmund is drunk at this point and isn't thinking clearly, so he also bids Sinfjötli to drink. Sinfjötli drank it and died. Sigmund was furious that his wife killed his son, so he drove Borghild out of the kingdom. Borghild died shortly after that.

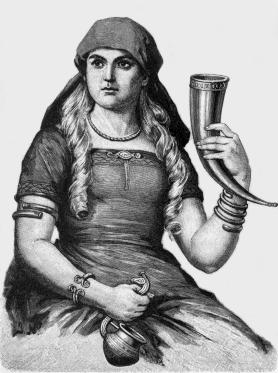
Swedish goddess holding drinking horn

Borghild's poison worked on Sinfjötli and not Sigmund because of the Volsung blood. According to legend, the Volsung family descended from Odin, and were therefore part god. Sigmund had more god-like blood in him than Sinfjötli, so Sigmund could withstand the poison, and Sinfjötli could not.

== See also ==
- Völsunga saga
- Viking
- Saga
- Sigurd
- Sinfjötli
- Sigmund
