= Ragnhild Tregagås =

Norwegian woman accused and convicted of witchcraft in 1324–1325

Ragnhild Tregagås or Tregagás was a Norwegian woman from Bergen. From 1324 to 1325, Tregagås was accused and convicted of exercising witchcraft and selling her soul to the devil. She was "accused of performing magical rituals of a harmful nature, demonism and heresy" as well as the crimes of adultery and incest with her cousin, Bård. She was sentenced to strict fasting and a seven-year-long pilgrimage to holy places outside of Norway by Bishopp Audfinn Sigurdsson, as documented in his proclamation "De quaddam lapsa in heresim Ragnhild Tregagås" and the sentencing "Alia in eodem crimine". It is likely that Ragnhild Tregagås held a higher social position in Bergen, as the Bishop dealt with her personally and did not sentence her to death. There is little documentation on who Ragnhild Tregagås was as a person. Due to the date of her trial, it is likely that she was born in the late 13th century. There is also no recorded death date for Ragnhild Tregagås. She was married, her husband's name is undocumented, and he died before the trial, likely unaware of his wife's adultery. The trial against Ragnhild Tregagås is the only one concerning witchcraft that is known from medieval Norway, taking place 250 years before the witch-hunt in Norway started.

== Tregagås' witchcraft ==
At Bård's wedding, to a woman named Bergljot, Ragnhild allegedly promised the bride that her new husband's genitalia would do no better at giving her children than a belt. On the wedding night, Ragnhild Tregagås was accused of cursing Bård and Bergljot by hiding five loaves of bread and five peas in their bed and placing a sword nearby to divide the couple and spark conflict. Tregagås allegedly placed the peas to hinder Bård's ability to father children while the bread was used to strengthen her curse. By placing the curses' ingredients in the bed, Tregagås allegedly violated old Norwegian laws against witchcraft, "if sorcery is found in bedding or bolster, the hair of a man, or nails or frog feet or other talismans which are thought wont in witchcraft, then a charge may be made." Hiding in Bård and Bergljot's bedroom without their knowledge, Tregagås cursed them. Trial records provide a spell used by the accused Ragnhild Tregagås to end the marriage of her former lover. The charm contains a mention of the valkyrie Göndul being "sent out":

Original Norwegian:

"Ritt ek i fra mer gondols ondu.
æin þer i bak biti
annar i briost þer biti
þridi snui uppa þik
hæimt oc ofund,"

English translation:

"I hurl the spirits of Gandul;
One bites you in your back
Another one bites your chest
And the third afflicts you
With hatred and envy."

After she finished cursing the newlyweds, Bård chased Ragnhild away. After the wedding, Ragnhild Tregagås repeated the curse and was quoted saying, "My mind laughs at the idea that Bård's genitals, bewitched, are no more capable of mating than the belt rolled up in my hand." She appeared to be successful in leaving Bård impotent and dividing the couple. The couple divorced shortly thereafter, and Bård moved north to Hålogaland, where Ragnhild planned to follow and promised to break the curse if Bård stayed with her.

== Tregagås' confessions and trial ==
In November of 1324, in Fusa, Ragnhild Tregagås bragged about her accomplishments, and following town gossip, was accused of witchcraft and summoned to a Bergen court in late January of 1325. After gathering reliable witnesses who overheard Ragnhild's confessions in Fusa, the Bergen Clergy led Tregagås to her final confession on 8 February, 1325. Like many accused witches in later trials, there is a possibility that Ragnhild was forced to confess by Bishop Audfinn and the rest of the Bergen clergy.

In her confessions, Ragnhild Tregagås confessed that the witnesses were not lying and that she had had sexual relations with Bård multiple times, while her husband was still alive. After Bård and Bergljot began seeing each other, she rejected God and followed the Devil in order to break up the couple. She confessed that her spell did influence Bård and Bergljot's decision to divorce as well as Bård's decision to move Northward, also confessing that she had indeed hidden in their room to perform the curse. Tregagås revealed that during their relationship, she controlled Bård's life, threatening that if he did not do as she asked she would confess everything to her husband, threatening Bård with the legal or fatal consequences of incest and adultery. She ended her confessions by claiming that Sørle Sigh was responsible for teaching her 'heretical conjuring'.

=== Sentencing and conviction ===
After leaving Ragnhild Tregagås imprisoned for a period of time, Bishop Audfinn delivered Tregagås' sentencing in "Alia in eodem crimine". Believing Tregagås to not be in her right mind and under the influence of the devil, Audfinn chose to not judge her case too harshly. In order to repent, Tregagås should fast twice a week on only water and bread for the rest of her life, in conjunction with religiously designated fasting days. Tregagås was also ordered to leave Norway and embark on a seven-year-long pilgrimage to experience the places holy to Christianity. If she broke either division of the sentence, Ragnhild would be listed as guilty of all charges, including heresy, and a new punishment would be determined by the royal court, likely death by burning at the stake. Documentation on Tregagås stops after her sentencing.

== Medieval Norway ==
In the early 14th century, between 1316 and 1319, Sweden elected their new king, three-year-old Magnus Eriksson. King Magnus IV soon became the king of Norway as well, after his grandfather, King Håkon V, died. In 1332, Magnus also took control of Denmark, making him the ruler of most of Scandinavia in the early 14th century. On the local level, Norwegian authorities were viewed as corrupt and criminal cases were mostly handled locally rather than at higher levels. Beginning before the reign of King Magnus IV, efforts to change society were made by both the monarchy and the church, linking the laws of the land with the church's views. This connection likely led to the anti-witchcraft legislation and later witch trials (mentioned under the Norwegian Paganism, Witchcraft, and Magic section), as the country moved away from its Pagan past toward its Christian future. Because King Magnus IV was a child when Ragnhild was accused of witchcraft and crimes were tried on the local level, the Christian clergy had the final say in her trial. Being the first witch trial in Norwegian history, Ragnhild's trial set some precedent for the later trials, namely for sentencing and legislation to align with Christian beliefs rather than older, Pagan-like practices of witchcraft.

=== Christianization of Norway ===
During the late 13th century, Norwegian Vikings also experience a sudden shift in acceptability with the influence of Christianity. King Hákon Haakon IV Haakonsson embarked on a 1247 crusade by invitation of the French king, Louis IX, and was reportedly embarrassed by the Vikings' behavior. Due to their wild behavior, the Hirdskrá, Law of the Hird, was created in order to regulate what behavior was honorable and what was not. The Hirdskrá promised that there would always be a possibility of salvation and that all behavior could be fixed. These hirdmen would swear oaths to their king that would be broken when the king died, and a new oath would need to be sworn to his successor. These oaths and written regulations, born out of King Hákon's embarrassment over his hirdmen's behavior before the French King, who ruled over a very Christian land, can also be attributed to how the religious and legal demographics were changing in medieval Norway. The recognized social or belief systems of Norwegian Vikings, like Nordic paganism, were beginning to be dismantled as their values and practices did not align with the Christian religion growing across the nation.

Following the beginning of Christianization in Norway at the end of the first millennium, the slow process of Norwegian kings establishing the new religion in their territories began. The løgting, or lawthing, system was developed in the 11th century, at the very beginning of the second millennium, which aided kings in congealing their legal practices. One of the first løgtings, the Borgarthing, was developed by King Olaf II Haraldsson in Borg in 1016. On the throne, as Christianity was just being introduced to the country, King Olaf II used the Law of the Borgarthing to spread the religion through his legal foundations and pull lower-level administrative sectors under his control. In areas under Borgarthing legislation, the King would have more power than anywhere else in Norway. Those who lived under the legislation of the Borgarthing were subject to fines and harsh consequences. For the Christians under this legislation, King Olaf II could take control of any church at his own will, typically the fylkir churches which were the highest on the religious hierarchy. The citizens who still identified as Pagan were forced to convert to Christianity and would lose many possessions as "tribute" to the King. While these consequences written into the legislation did not ban the practice and worship of Paganism, this is likely where the implementation of anti-Pagan laws was born as Christianity was viewed as the better, more acceptable alternative. This legislative effort was not just created to benefit the King, but to influence all levels of the kingdom, following a "top-down" approach to converting the country to Christianity, where efforts begin at the very top and eventually trickle down to the bottom. The løgting approach put into place by King Olaf II began the process of congealing smaller communities into the larger kingdom and uniting all of Norway under one ruler and one set of rules. With the beginning of anti-Pagan legislation and the congealing of smaller communities, løgtings like the Borgarthing law are evidence that Christianity was becoming the tool used to rewrite Norway's future and begin to move the nation further from Paganism.

=== Reception of Nordic witchcraft ===
Despite magic being viewed as common during most of the Middle Ages in Europe, witchcraft in the 14th century was almost synonymous with heresy and was often legally documented close after sections on bestiality and heathen sacrifice, thereby linking witchcraft with dark, taboo, and sexual topics. In the Swedish medieval period, using the term trolle hus' (troll or witch house) was often equivalent to using the term whorehouse'. Stemming from a 12th-century letter from a Norwegian archbishop by the name of Eirikr, there was a common understanding that the inability to conceive a child could only be linked to either disease or witchcraft. The crimes Ragnhild Tregagås was accused of were sexual in nature as she allegedly cursed her former lover into impotence, and were similar to accusations used in Witch Trials in the later centuries. The Hauksbók, an Icelandic manuscript, contains sermons warning against witchcraft and women that use sexual magic to get men to love them.

Bergen, where Ragnhild Tregagås lived, had higher amounts of witchcraft cases than other Norwegian cities, dealing with 16 before the 17th century began. Lyderhorn mountain, located in the Laksevåg area, south of the city centre of Bergen, was believed to be somewhere where witches would gather on Christmas Eve.

== Norwegian paganism, witchcraft, and magic ==
Documents remaining from Medieval Scandinavia that refer to witches and the practice of witchcraft either fall under literature, legislature and prosecution records. Norway was converted to Christianity in the late 10th century, but the process of conversion for Norwegian people would have been slow, with many believing in a combination of Christian and pagan customs. Tregagås' use of the valkyrie Göndul in her spell leans her closer to the Nordic Pagan belief system rather than Christianity. A polytheistic religion, Nordic Paganism followed the old gods, like Odin, Thor, and Tyr. Valkyries were a group of female warriors, handpicked by Odin himself, that took care of the bodies of slain warriors in battle. Göndul was featured in the story Tåtten about Sørli: the saga about Hedin and Hogne alongside the goddess Frøya or Freyja, the Norse fertility goddess. In the saga, Freyja and Göndul use witchcraft to influence Hedin and get the treasured jewelry, the Brisingamen, back from Odin. As she knew of and believed in Göndul, it is likely that Ragnhild believed in Freyja, goddess of fertility and love, as the goddess' powers aligned with Tregagås' own alleged witchcraft. Christianity had been present in Norway 300 years before Tregagås was accused of witchcraft, but her connection with Göndul and Freyja leads to an understanding that the pre-Christian beliefs persisted, likely through oral traditions.

The subject of fertility was very prevalent in ancient Norwegian and Norse literature. The Vǫlsa þáttr tells of a family that preserved a horse's penis with linen and leek, before using it as a religious object. The Hávamál advises against sexual relations with witches.

Many Scandinavian sagas featured stories of magic in both pre-Christian and Christian times. A 13th-century saga, originating from Greenland tells the story of a vǫlva (seeress in Germanic paganism) named Þorbjǫrg before the country was converted to Christianity, in which she practices her ritual in the presence of spirits. The saga Eriríks saga rauða or The Saga of Erik the Red, which takes place during Greenland's 13th-century famine, details Þorbjörg receiving her seiðr and receiving help from Guðríðr, a Christian woman, who performed the varðlokur, warlock songs she had learned from her foster-mother in Iceland. Guðríðr did not identify as a witch, but her foster-mother Halldis likely did. With Guðríðr's song, Þorbjörg predicted that Guðríðr would have a good future and Greenland's famine would end. The use of magic in the sagas aligns with Nordic Pagan beliefs and not with the negative, Christian view of magic seen later. The use of song in magic was common in Scandinavian countries like Norway and Sweden, as the singer would have control over various creatures, both supernatural and natural.

The practice and reception of Norwegian Witchcraft had many connections to the mythical creature, the Troll. In Norwegian, Swedish, and Danish languages, the word troll itself was linked to witchcraft, trollfolk meaning witches, trollman meaning male witch, trollkvinne and trollkone translating to a female witch, and trolldom meaning witchcraft. Trollcats were often regarded as the Norwegian witch's familiar. For early Norwegians, trolls were just as real as their human neighbors, existing in sagas, Eddas, and even legislation. Predating the 12th century, Norwegian Christian laws forbade citizens from conversing with and interacting with trolls, and in documents dating from 1274 to 1781, doing so would result in severe punishment. These codes forbade the citizens from "sitting outside to wake the trolls" and seeking their knowledge, and likely stemmed from the seiðr, a Nordic ritual done to gain knowledge from the past, present, and future. The 1274 law, written into national law, was the first law to prohibit anything related to the practice of magic. In Norse mythology, trolls were often viewed as antisocial and all interactions with humans were initiated by the human. So if a Norwegian citizen had an experience with a troll, it was due to their own actions and the result of violating these laws. As the centuries progressed, and the Christianization of Norway solidified, the term for troll stopped referring to the mythological creature but instead became linked to the dead, to hinder communication with spirits. For pre-Christian Norwegians, the dead were never truly gone as tradition saw consumable offerings being left at gravesites, similar to the Mexican traditions for Dia de Los Muertos. Negative spirits from Hel were also recorded, and would often assault the living. This contact with the dead, both positive and negative, aligns more with Pagan beliefs and was reformed during Christianization. In the eyes of the Christian society, trolls and magic users were regarded on the same level as homosexuality, as documented in the Old Law of Gulathing's Law of Personal Rights. As Christianity took hold over Norse society, fear arose that trolls would steal unbaptized infants and replace them with their own.

While there is not much documentation on Ragnhild Tregagås before and after the events surrounding her trial, Tregagås' alleged use of magic ties back to pre-Christian Nordic practices of magic, with strong ties to Nordic paganism. Her case is a remnant of an important, societal shift from pagan Scandinavia to the Christianization of the region, as evidenced by the church's involvement in her sentencing and the legislation crafted against the practice of witchcraft.

== In media ==
The story of Ragnhild Tregagås was documented in a 1925 entry of Gula Tidend and in a 1912 book called People and Church in the Middle Ages: Studies of Norwegian History, which claims Ragnhild had three husbands.

In 2020, musician Jon Krasheninnikoff Skarin released a song under the project Fuimadane named after Ragnhild Tregagås, putting a Nordic twist on electronic music.
