= Lauk =

Lauk may refer to:

- "Leek" in Old Norse
- Library Association, sometimes abbreviated as LAUK
