= Slöinge =

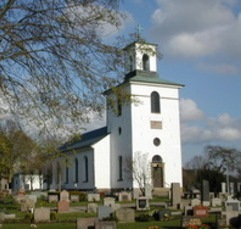

- Location within Halland Location within Sweden
- Coordinates: 56°51′N 12°42′E
- Country: Sweden
- Province: Halland
- County: Halland County
- Municipality: Falkenberg Municipality

Area
  - Total: 1.02 km^{2} (0.39 sq mi)

Population (31 December 2010)
  - Total: 950
  - Density: 930/km^{2} (2,400/sq mi)
- Time zone: UTC+1 (CET)
  - Summer (DST): UTC+2 (CEST)

Slöinge is a locality situated in Falkenberg Municipality, Halland County, Sweden, with 950 inhabitants in 2010.

Archeological excavations has revealed a chieftain estate from the 8th century; among the remains is a large number of golden figures.

Two comparatively large companies, SIA Glass and Berte Quarn, have their headquarters in the village.

The 1971 World Table Tennis Championships singles champion Stellan Bengtsson was born in Slöinge.
