= Leeks in Germanic paganism =

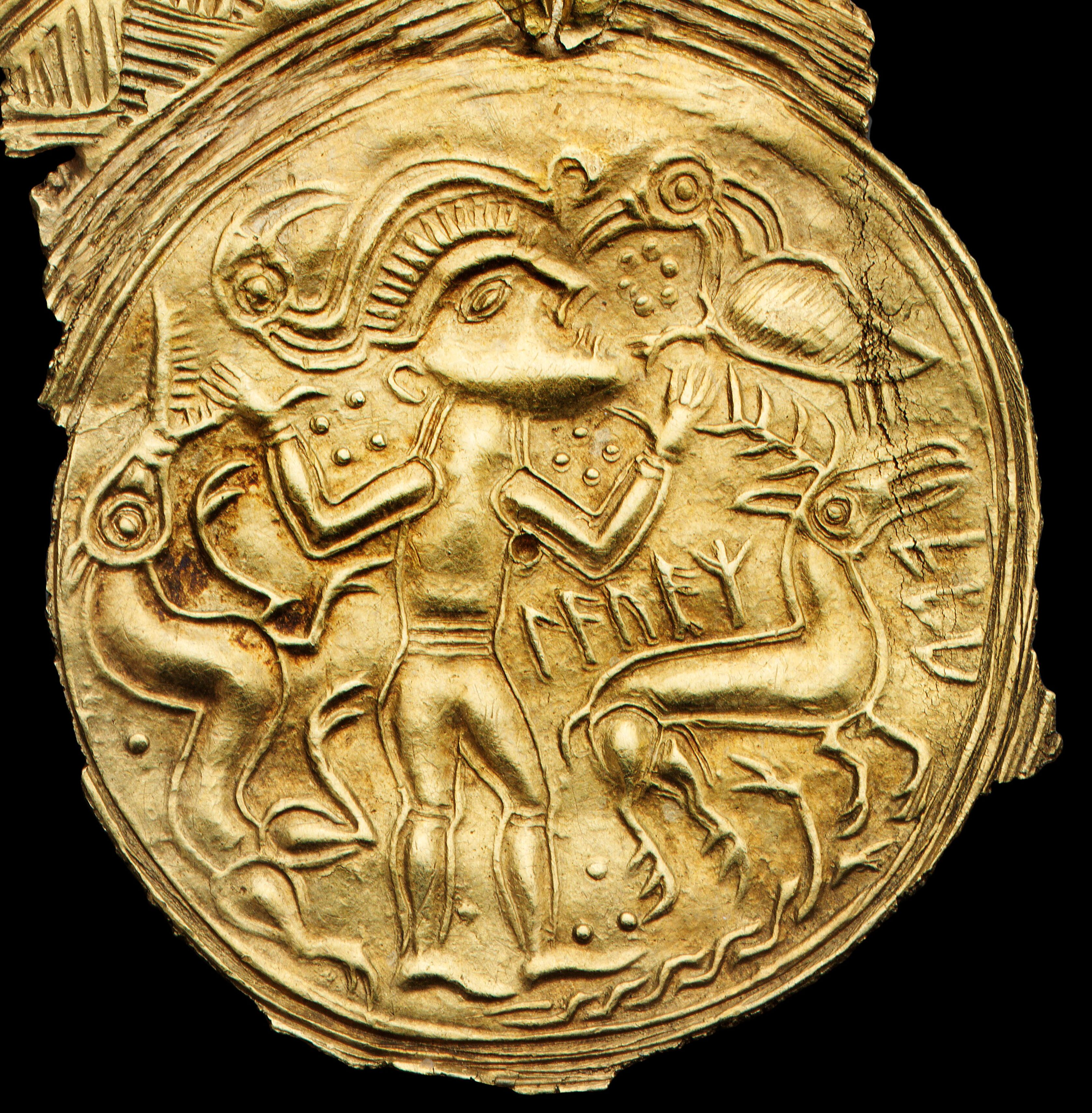
Laukaz ("leek") and alu written on a bracteate from Skrydstrup, Jutland (DR IK166)

Leeks (Old Norse: laukar) were important in Germanic paganism, as attested in runic inscriptions, archaeology and Old Norse literature, where they are the most attested plant. The category of leeks in early Germanic cultures was broad, as it still is to some extent in modern Germanic languages such as English, encompassing members of the Allium genus, and likely several other similar looking plants with bulbs.

The word ᛚᚨᚢᚲᚨᛉ (laukaz or laukaʀ), likely meaning leek, is found as a charm word on migration period bracteates, often alongside other charm words such as ᚨᛚᚢ (alu). It also appears on a 4th-century runic inscription on a knife from Fløksand, Norway, which references both lína ('flax') and laukaz, possibly as a ritual formula. These plants are also connected in the 14th century Vǫlsa þáttr, which describes a heathen housewife in Norway using them to preserve and empower a horse's penis. The plants also likely played an important role in burial practices and may be further depicted on Iron Age gold-foil figures known as guldgubbar, where an object resembling them is held between a male and a female figure.

The function of leeks in early Germanic religion is debated and rarely explicitly stated; however, they are typically interpreted as symbols of fertility, and were likely used for protection against threats, such as poison and magic. They were likely also used to bestow healing and life. These idea possibly stemmed from their preservative and antimicrobial properties, along with their apparent revival when growing from bulbs.

== Terminology and etymology ==
=== Etymology, cognates and scope ===
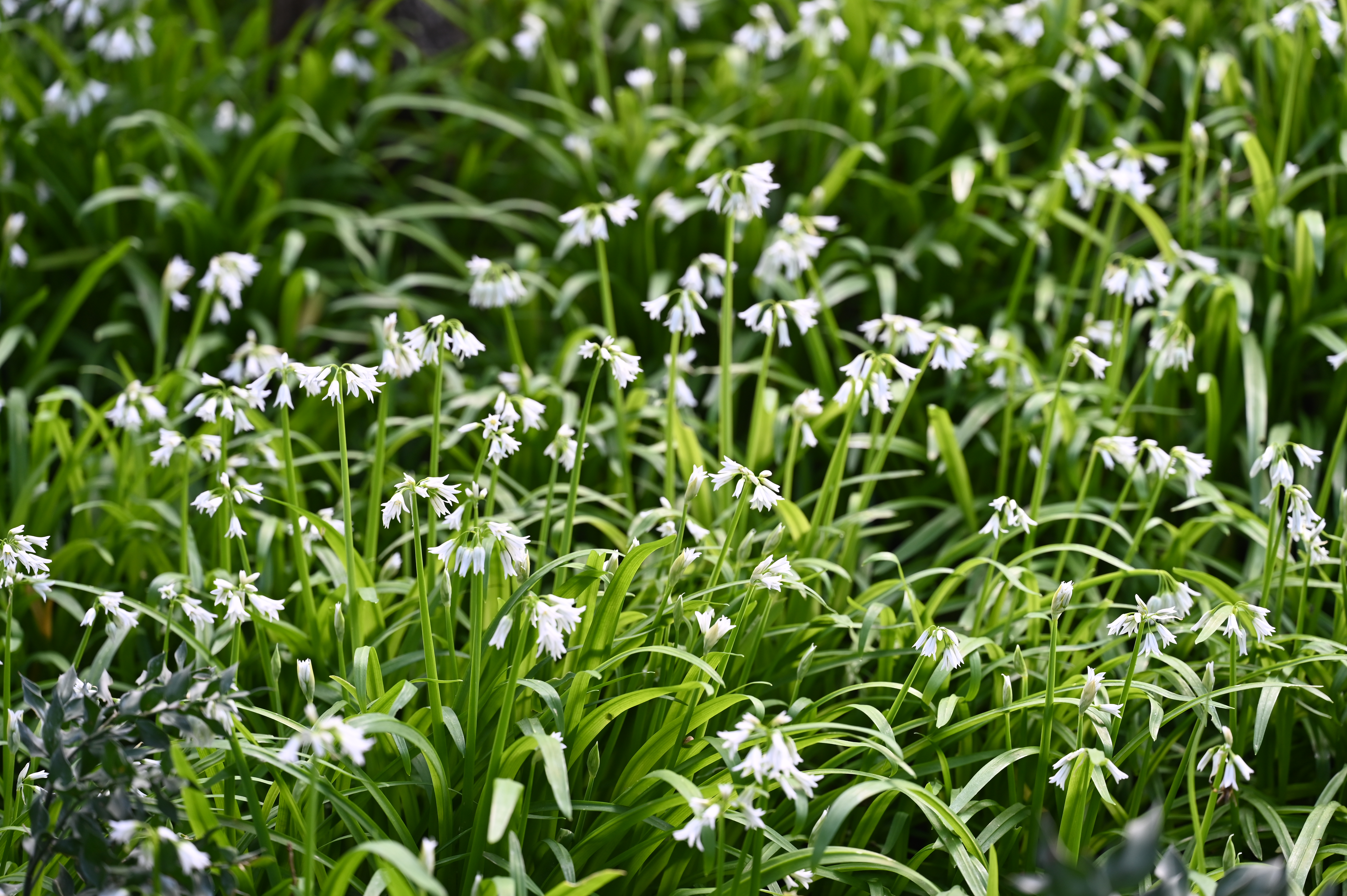
Three-cornered leek (Allium triquetrum)

Modern English: "leek" is derived from Old English: lac ('leek, onion, garlic'), which in turn comes from Proto-Germanic: *laukaz. While in Modern English, "leek" typically refers to Allium porrum, it can also refer to other plants of the Allium genus (such as three-cornered leeks, stone leeks) or other bulbous plants (such as houseleeks and dog leeks). This includes wild leeks. The wider scope of "leek" is also seen in compound terms such as "garlic" (from Old English: gárléac, literally 'gare (spear) leek') and now displaced terms for "onion" such as hinne-lēac (from Old English: ynne-lēac) and "knẹ̄-lẹ̄k" (literally 'knee-leek').

'Leek' is cognate with Proto Norse: laukaʀ, Old Norse: laukr ('leek, onion, garlic') and their descendents in modern North Germanic languages such as Icelandic: laukur ('onion, garlic, bulb'), Faroese: leykur ('onion') and Swedish: lök ('onion'). These terms also are found in compound nouns for Alliums, such as Swedish: ramslök (Allium ursinum) and purjolök (Allium porrum). Some plants outside the Allium genus can also be referred to in Swedish as lök, including Hylotelephium telephium (huslök) and Sempervivum tectorum (taklök). It is unclear which Allium species are referred to by laukr, however it likely varied regionally depending on the local availability. Furthermore, there was not the modern conception of the genus Allium, and therefore it is likely some species outside of that group could be referred to as laukar. This wide scope is similar to other Old Norse terms such as gras ('grass'). Other terms in Germanic languages derived ultimately from *laukaz include Dutch: lok ('leek') and German: Lauch or lok ('leek'). It was also loaned into non-Germanic languages, giving rise to Finnish: laukka ('plant of genus Allium'). The origin of *laukaz is unclear, but it may be derived from the verb *leukan ('to close'), in reference to the leaves or scales that enclose stems and growing points in leeks.

=== Use in Old Norse texts ===
Laukar are the most attested plant in Old Norse literature. In skaldship, they are used in kennings for swords such as sárlaukr ('wound-leek'), and blóðlaukr ('blood-leek'). In Helgakviða Hundingsbana I, King Sigmund give his newborn son a ítrlaukr ('beautiful leek'), the meaning of which is debated, but is often seen as another kenning for 'sword'. Tt has also been argued to be a type of plant, based on Germanic parallels such as Magnus the Good giving Harald a plant as a sign of him giving him half his kingdom and Olaf Tryggvasson giving his wife an angelica stalk.

Women can be referred to by kennings such as lofðungr lauks ('the lord of the leek') and Lofn lauka ('the Lofn [goddess] of leeks'), while ættarlaukr ('family-leek') is used as a kenning for a family's male representative. In Guðrúnarkviða I, Guðrún praises the murdered Sigurð by comparing him to a geirlaukr (literally 'gare (spear) leek', as with 'garlic') that had grown above the grass, while in Guðrúnarkviða II she makes the same comparison but instead with grœnn laukr ('green leek').

Leeks are also alluded to in the Frostaþing's laws by the term laucgarð ('leek-yard'), referring to fenced pieces of land where the plants are cultivated. They are also found in the Eddic poem Vǫluspá, where green leeks sprout from the earth after Borr's sons create Miðgarð, likely intending to reflect the growth of all plants.

== Laukaz in runic inscriptions ==
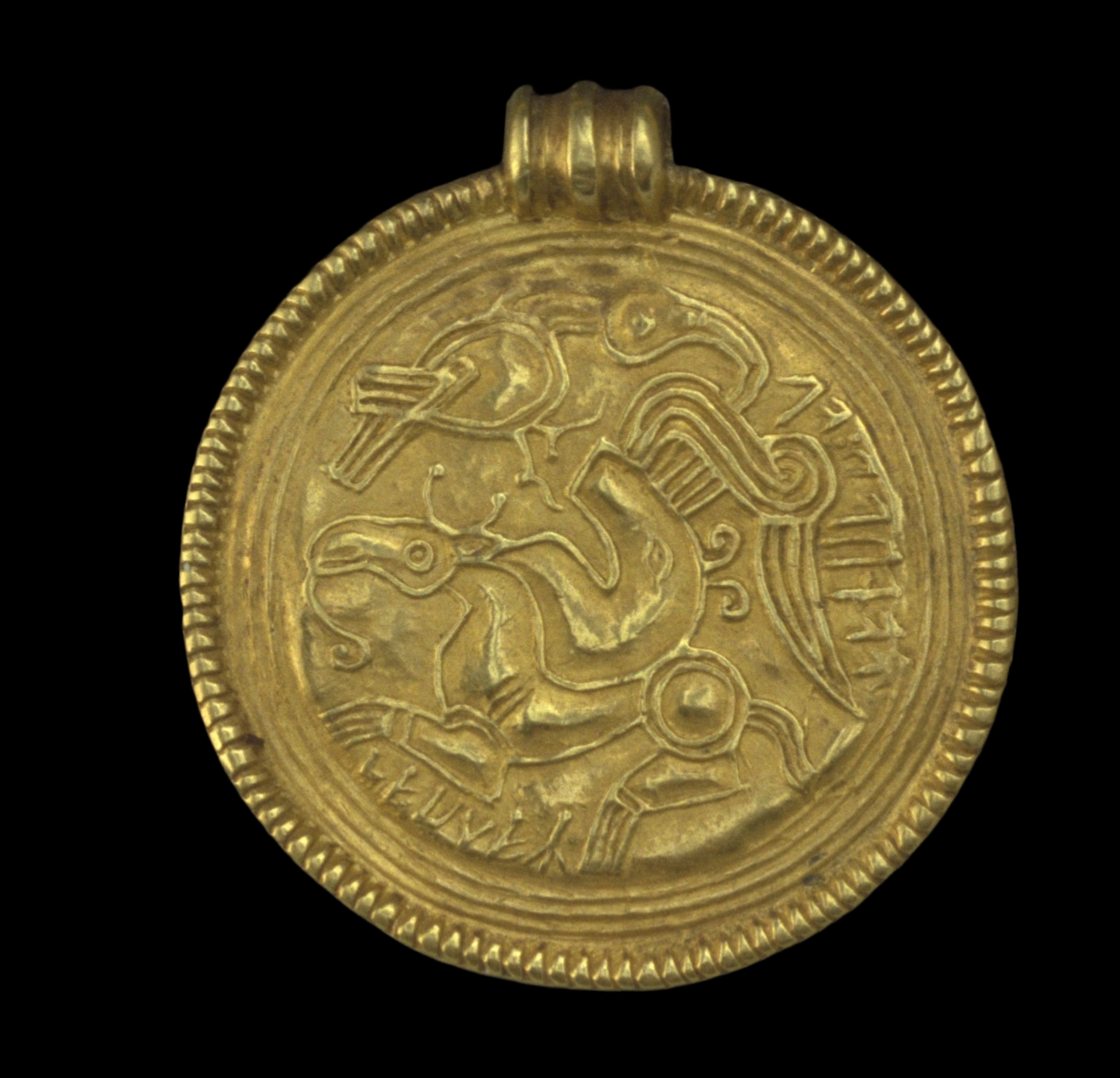
Laukaz on a bracteate from Börringe, Skåne (DR IK26)

The word ᛚᚨᚢᚲᚨᛉ (laukaz or laukaʀ) is found in numerous Elder fuþark runic inscriptions. In these inscriptions, the word is found either on its own or alongside other common runic formula words, such as ᚨᛚᚢ (alu, likely literally 'ale') and laþu ('invitation, summons'). It may be written either in full or in abbreviated forms such as lakʀ, lkaʀ and lauʀ. It has further been suggested that the rune ᛚ (l) in texts can be an abbreviation of laukaʀ, this is uncertain and could also be an abbreviation of another word such as alu.

Most 'leek-inscriptions' are found on gold B- and C-bracteates dating from around 400-600 CE, most of which have been found in Denmark. These were worn as medallions, particularly by women and may have been used for protection against harm from beings or illnesses, or for healing, in reference to the preserving effects of leeks. It has been further suggested they may have been used to bring prosperity. Along with alu and laþu, laukaz on bracteates may be a reference to the (possibly ritual) intoxication with herbs and drinks. The best interpretation of early runic formula words such as these remains uncertain, however.

== Lín and laukr ==
=== Fløksand and Gjersvik knife inscriptions ===
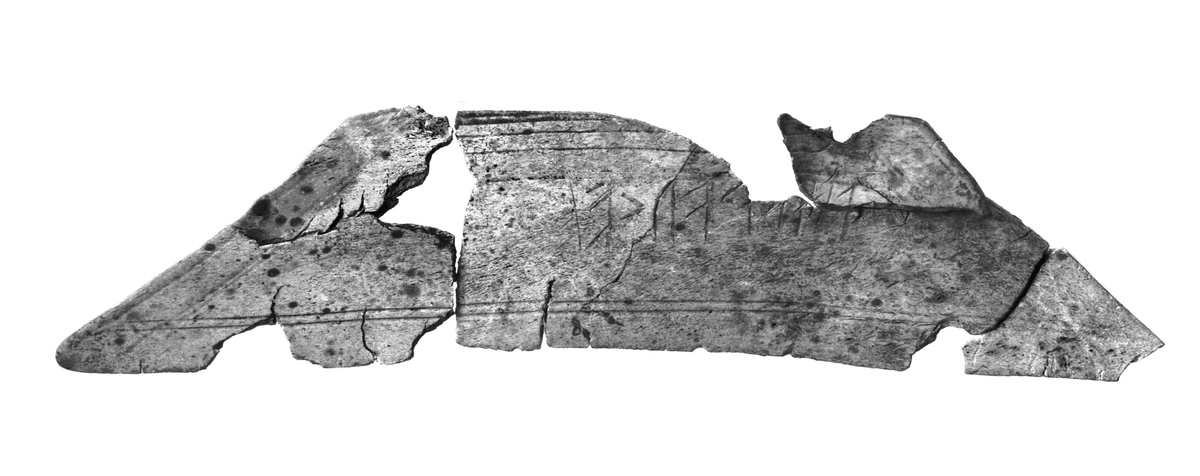
Fløksand knife, Universitetsmuseet i Bergen.

The alliterative words lín ('flax, line' or 'linen') and laukr ('leek') are linked are found together on the elder fuþark inscription N KJ37, which was likely intended to have a magical function. This text is carved on a bone scraping knife dated to c. 350 CE that was found in a woman's urn at Fløksand in Hordaland. The urn was given to Bergen Museum in 1864 and the knife was later found in 1908. The runes read right-to-left:

ᛚ ᛁ ᚾ ᚨ ᛚ ᚨ ᚢ ᚲ (ᚨᛉ) ᚠ/ᚨ
l i n a l a u k (az) f/a
linen (and) leek

In the text, the a and z are joined as a bindrune of the same form as that found in the Eikeland fibula inscription. The last rune's meaning and identity is less clear, with one interpretation being f (ᚠ) as an ideographic rune representing wealth.

The formula may also occur on another knife dating to c. 450 from Gjersvik, also in Hordaland. The inscription (N KJ38) reads d-[-]fioþi l l l l l l l l l l. The ten ᛚ runes (l) may be connected to the Fløksand knife's inscription, with a proposed interpretation being "linen (and) leek, linen (and) leek, linen (and) leek, linen (and) leek, linen (and) leek".

=== Vǫlsa þáttr ===
The two words are also linked in an explicitly ritual context in Vǫlsa þáttr, contained in Flateyjarbók. It describes how one autumn in the beginning of the 11th century, a horse died at a remote farm in northern Norway where the inhabitants were still heathen. Its penis was cut off and the housewife dried it, enclosed it in linen and added leeks and other herbs so that it wouldn't rot. She then placed it in a chest. By this process, the penis's strength grew and the housewife honoured it as if it were her god. After the evening meal, the housewife would lead a ceremony in which the horse penis, referred to as Vǫlsi, was passed round, accompanied by the reciting of stanzas of poetry. One of these describes the preparation of Vǫlsi:

Old Norse text	Translation
Aukinn ertu, Vǫlsi, ok upp tekinn líni gœddr, en laukum studdr. Þiggi Maurnir þetta blæti! (Note: The phrase Þiggi Maurnir þetta blæti ('May Maurnir receive this offering') acts as a refrain in the same place in all the ritual verses and may be a preserved heathen blót formula.) En þú, bóndi sjálfr, ber þú at þér Vǫlsa!	Increased art thou, Vǫlsi, and also erected, with linen enlarged and with leek supported; May Maurnir receive this offering! But you, the farmer himself, you take Vǫlsi to yourself!

The tale notes that this time, King Olaf was trying to Christianise those who were still heathen in Norway and so he travelled in disguise to the farm. There he witnessed the Vǫlsi ritual, ultimately throwing it to a dog, after which the people there accept Christianity.

=== Formula existence and function ===
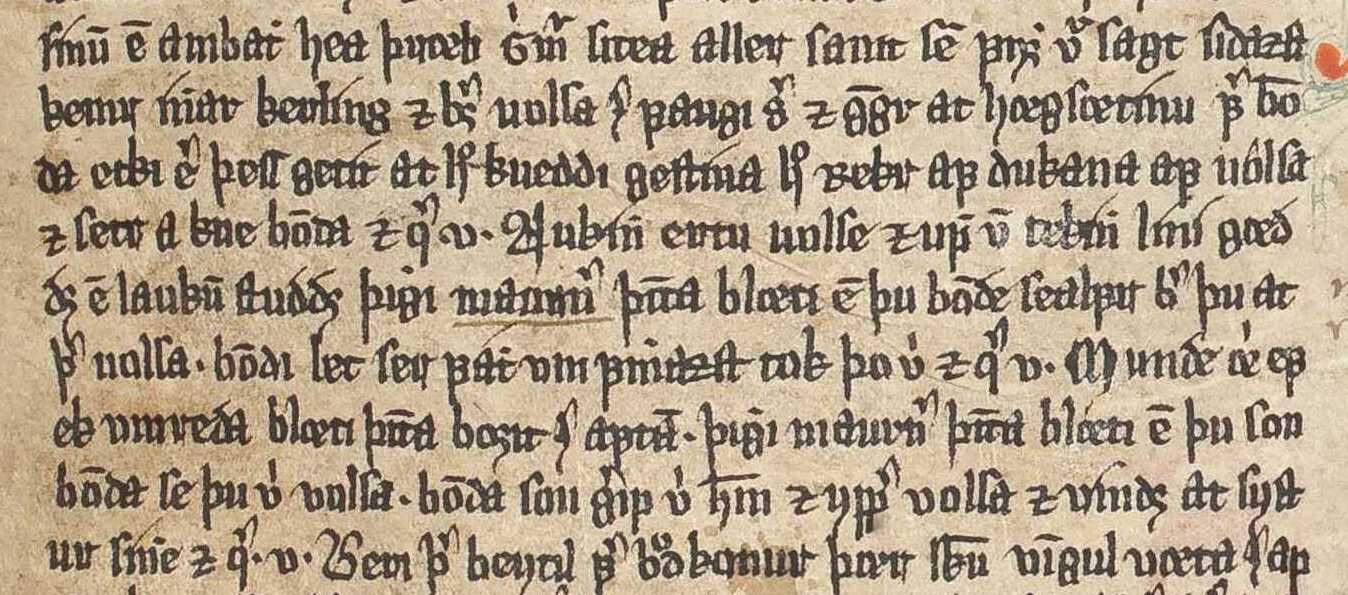
Vǫlsa þáttr's stanza on the preparation of the horse penis Vǫlsi with lín and laukr in Flateyjarbók. (Note: The stanza begins in the middle of the 5th line from the top shown, and ends near the beginning of the 7th line from the top.)

It is disputed to what extent Vǫlsa þáttr reflects actual historic heathen practices. As one of the "conversion þættir" in Óláfs saga helga, it is written so as to portray Christianity as correct and heathendom as evil and wrong, possibly exaggerating or inventing elements to make it look more strange. For example, while the above stanza attributes the power and movement of the horse penis to the linen and leek, the text at one point says it was through the Devil's power (fjándans kraft).

Most scholars that have written on the subject, however, have seen some ideas as old at the time of the texts composition, including the combination of lín and laukr, which they frequently connect to the inscriptions at Fløksand and Gjersvik. There is a gap of around 1000 years between the sources, however it has been argued that Norway in this time had relatively stable settlement patterns and development of ideas has been attested in other contexts over a similar length of time in the region.

It has been argued by scholars such as Düwel that arguments linking the two are circular, explaining the antiquity of details in Völsa þáttr with the inscriptions, which in turn are interpreted as being linked to a ritual such as that seen in the þáttr. There are notable details that do suggest a connection between the text, however. The inscribed knives are identified as meat knives or scrapers to remove flesh from hides. It has been suggested that such a tool may have been used to cut off parts of the animal such as the penis, as in Völsa þáttr. The writing on the Floksand knife may have been to dedicate it to the specialist ritual task and set it apart from normal meat processing. Furthermore, women are prominent in both contexts: knives of the inscribed type in Norway are only known in women's graves and the ritual was led by the housewife in Völsa þáttr. lin and laukr are also plant names and alliterate with one another, a feature often seen in religious formulae. A widespread formulaic connection between lín and laukr, particulalrly in runic inscriptions, may also be found in 10th century manuscripts that use the two words as names for the ᛚ rune.

The combination of the two may have had associations of fertility and hieros gamos, with the lin (or the Maurnir in Vǫlsa þáttr) reflecting the female and the leek, the male. The reason it is lín that is used is unclear, however in some cultures it is seen as a pure material used for priests and to cover holy objects, and is frequently used in bandages.

== Archaeology ==
=== Graves ===
Allium species, probably including sand leek, are found in amulet capsules in women's graves in Vellensby and Nørre Sandegård in Bornholm, dating to the Late-Roman period and c. 650 CE respectively. It has also been proposed that laukr could also have referred to oat grass or dropwort, both of which have tubers similar to those of allium species and have been found widely in bronze and Iron Age graves in Northern Europe, alongside other plant material such as seeds, nuts and legumes. Often the tubers seem to have been placed in graves and urns after cremation had taken place, suggesting a role in a later part of the funerary process. Given that finds of these plants are much rarer after Christianisation, their use may have been closely tied to heathen ritual practices.

Ahmad ibn Fadlan's eye-witness description of the Volga Rus' from around 921 CE provides further evidence for the use of leeks or similar plants in funerals. In it, he describes how when a chieftain died, he was after a time dressed and taken out to a ship. They then laid food such as bread and onions beside him in it, and ultimately burnt it, with the intention of the dead man reaching Paradise. Furthermore, a possible reference to their use in burials is one riddle of the Gátur Gestumblinda in Hervarar saga ok Heiðreks, in which a leek is described as having its feet stretching towards the sun and its head turned to Hel. It has been suggested that this may not have been only intended to refer to its base pointing into the earth and the underworld, but also into the grave, where leeks were placed.

If species such as oat grass and dropwort were indeed seen as laukar, their placing in graves may have been to protect them from necromancy or the dangers they could encounter on the journey to the afterlife. They may have also been intended to help them return to life when they reach the afterlife, mirroring the apparent revival of sprouting bulbs. The protective function of leeks in this context has also been suggested to be to protect those that are still living from the dead, who they may have feared could return as a being such as an aptrganga or gengångare. It is possible the plants were also intended as food for the dead, however based on their scarcity in settlement sites, oat grass and dropwort were likely not typically eaten by the living. They may have therefore been specifically food for the dead or for eating in religious ceremonies.

=== Pictoral depictions ===
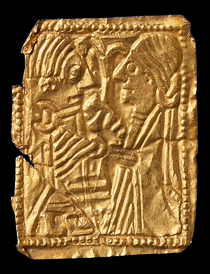
Guldgubbe from Hauge, Rogaland, showing a leek-like object in between a male and female figure.

Leeks may be depicted on guldgubbar (gold foil figures) from the Iron Age grave mound complex at Hauge in Rogaland and Hov, Innlandet, both of which are in Norway, and three guldgubbar, which likely also originated in Norway but are now kept in the National Museum of Denmark. Guldgubbar found here depict a man and a woman facing and touching each other with their hands, and on five, the woman is holding an object which consists of a long stem that bends slightly at the bottom, and at the top splits into two lobes that curl round slightly. The identity of the held object has been debated, with proposals including a staff, a branch or a plant such as a leek.

Similar imagery is also seen on art such as the horse collar from the 10th century chamber grave in Mammen in Jutland, Denmark, where small root-like projections are also found at the bulbous bottom of the object. Furthermore, it resembles the item held alongside a drinking horn by a woman typically identified as a valkyrie on the Tjängvide image stone and a woman on a patrix for making guldgubbar from Uppåkra.

The male and female figures may be the gods Freyr and Freyja, and the leek may symbolise their power over fertility and the guldgubbar may in this case be votive offerings to ask for fertility, possibly specifically made at weddings. The human couples themselves could also be depicted, with a wedding ceremony possibly also having the aim of bringing fertility. An alternative is that the guldgubbar depict a dead man being welcomed by a valkyrie, with the leek reflecting the healing and sexual dimensions of the afterlife. (Note: Valkyries are often depicted as welcoming dead men to the afterlife and having power to bring them back to life in Old Norse literature. The Tjängvide image stone is also typically interpreted as depicting such a welcoming scene.)

== Properties ==
=== Life-giving and preservation ===
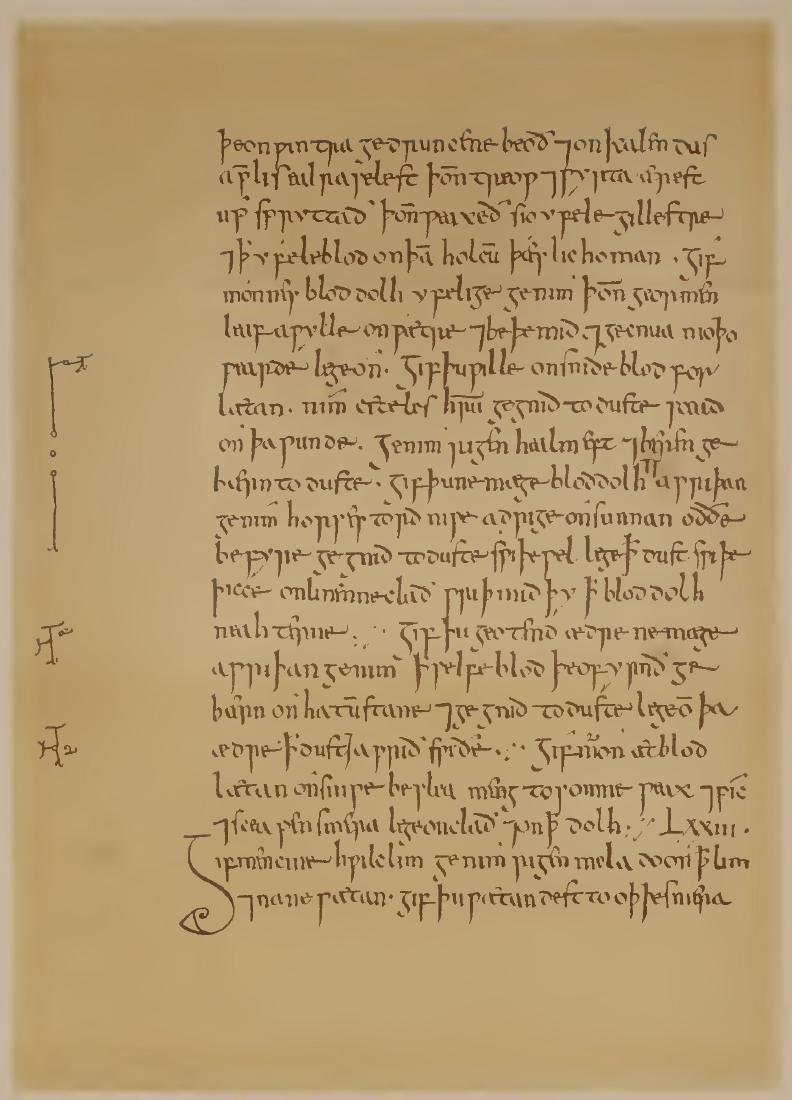
A facsimile page of Bald's Leechbook

Vǫlsa þáttr's description of herbs preserving and strengthening the horse penis resemble the account in Ynglinga saga, wherein Óðinn uses herbs and galdrar to preserve Mímir's chopped off head and enable him to speak again. In both cases, the body part is described as being strengthened by the process and is to some extent brought back to life. After this, Mímir is able to reveal the future to Óðinn. While the function of Vǫlsi is not stated in the text, it may also have been to acquire information, supported by the etymological connection between 'Vǫlsi' and 'völva' ('seeress'). Other examples of the use of herbs to preserve body parts include Gǫngu-Hrólfs saga, in which Ingigerðr preserves Gǫngu-Hrólfr's feet with herbs to keep them alive, and Egils saga einhenda ok Ásmundar berserkjabana, in which lifsgrǫs ('life-giving herbs') given by a gýgr stop Egil's hand dying. A similar description is given in the 14th century Pétrsdrápa, a skaldic song praising the Apostle Peter, that states the hymn is coated with laukr lífs ('leek of life').

The life-giving properties of leeks are also described in Ragnars saga loðbrókar, in which Asluag is given vínlauk ('a type of grass or herb') to eat because those who eat leeks will live for a long time, even if they eat no other food. This may be related to the valkyrie Sigrdrífa advising Sigurð in Sigrdrífumál to put leek in the drink in his horn to protect him from poison. Given that there was no conceptual distinction between poison and harmful magic at this time, leeks in drinks would likely also be considered protective against magic in a broader sense. Leeks, in particular garlic, also contain broad-spectrum antibiotics, such as allicin, that make them effective at treating infections. One of these compounds from garlic, allicin, has been identified as one of the bio-active components in a remedy against styes from the Old English medical text, Bald's leechbook. This recipe has been shown to be effective at killing bacteria, including methicillin-resistant Stapholococcus aureus and Pseudomonas aeruginosa. The preservative effect of garlic has been experimentally proven, with it delaying rotting of meat it is added to.

=== Fertility and sexuality ===
Leeks such as onions, have been shown to have aphrodisiac properties. It has been suggested that it is through this connection with sexuality that the leeks in Völsa þáttr strengthen the horse penis and make it stand on its own.

== See also ==
- Human uses of plants

== Bibliography ==
=== Primary and databases ===
- ibn Fadlan, Ahmad (26 July 2012). Ibn Fadlan and the Land of Darkness: Arab Travellers in the Far North (PDF). Penguin UK. ISBN 978-0-14-197504-7.
- Kroonen, Guus (2013). Etymological Dictionary of Proto-Germanic.
- McDougall, David (2007). "Anonymous Poems, Pétrsdrápa 8". Poetry on Christian Subjects. Skaldic Poetry of the Scandinavian Middle Ages 7. Turnhout: Brepols. pp. 802–803.
- "Kielitoimiston sanakirja". www.kielitoimistonsanakirja.fi.
- "hinne-leac and hinneleac - Middle English Compendium". quod.lib.umich.edu.
- "kne-lek and knelek - Middle English Compendium". quod.lib.umich.edu.
- "Old Icelandic Dictionary - Ítrlaukr". Old Icelandic Dictionary.
- "Old Icelandic Dictionary - Vínlaukr". Old Icelandic Dictionary.
- "OED: garlic". oed.com.
- "OED: leek". oed.com.
- "N KJ37". runor.raa.se.
- "N KJ38". runor.raa.se.
- "Anon (Vǫlsa) 4I". skaldic.org.
- "lök – SAOB". Svenska Akademiens ordböcker.
- "purjolök – SAOB". Svenska Akademiens ordböcker.

=== Secondary ===
- Elattar, Mariam M.; Darwish, Reham S.; Hammoda, Hala M.; Dawood, Hend M. (24 April 2024). "An ethnopharmacological, phytochemical, and pharmacological overview of onion (Allium cepa L.)". Journal of Ethnopharmacology. 324 117779. doi:10.1016/j.jep.2024.117779. PMID 38262524.
- Fuchs, Amanda L.; Weaver, Alan J.; Tripet, Brian P.; Ammons, Mary Cloud B.; Teintze, Martin; Copié, Valérie (2018). "Characterization of the antibacterial activity of Bald's eyesalve against drug resistant Staphylococcus aureus and Pseudomonas aeruginosa". PLOS ONE. 13 (11) e0208108. Bibcode:2018PLoSO..1308108F. doi:10.1371/journal.pone.0208108. PMC 6261618. PMID 30485362.
- Harrison, Freya; Roberts, Aled E. L.; Gabrilska, Rebecca; Rumbaugh, Kendra P.; Lee, Christina; Diggle, Stephen P. (11 August 2015). "A 1,000-Year-Old Antimicrobial Remedy with Antistaphylococcal Activity". mBio. 6 (4): e01129. doi:10.1128/mBio.01129-15. PMC 4542191. PMID 26265721.
- Heimdahl, Jens (2022). "Vad var laukr?". Fornvännen (in Swedish). 117 (4): 248–262.
- Heizmann, Wilhelm (1992). "Lein(en) und Lauch in der Inschrift von Floksand und im Vçlsa Jpáttr". In Beck, Heinrich; Ellmers, Detlev; Schier, Kurt (eds.). Germanische Religionsgeschichte: Quellen und Quellenprobleme (in German). De Gruyter. doi:10.1515/9783110877144. ISBN 978-3-11-087714-4.
- Heusler, Andreas (1903). "Die Geschichte vom Völsi, eine altnordische Bekehrungsanekdote". Zeitschrift des Vereins für Volkskunde (in German) (13): 24–39.
- Kaplan, Merrill (1 January 2009). "Heads and tales: Mímir, Völsi, and the pursuit of prophecy". Á Austrvega: Saga and East Scandinavia: Preprint Papers of the 14th International Saga Conference Uppsala, 9th-15th August 2009: 483.
- Kaplan, Merrill (2024). The Paganesque and the Tale of Vǫlsi. Boydell & Brewer. ISBN 978-1-84384-702-1.
- Lehmann, W. P. (October 1955). "Lín and Laukr in the Edda". The Germanic Review: Literature, Culture, Theory. 30 (3): 163–171. doi:10.1080/19306962.1955.11786798.
- Looijenga (2003). Texts & Contexts of the Oldest Runic Inscriptions. doi:10.1163/9789047401285. ISBN 978-90-474-0128-5.
- Markey, Tom (2013). "'Garlic and Sapphires in the Mud': 'Leeks' in their Early Folk Contexts" (PDF). Leeds Studies in English: 10–42.
- Nakamoto, Masato; Kunimura, Kayo; Suzuki, Jun-Ichiro; Kodera, Yukihiro (February 2020). "Antimicrobial properties of hydrophobic compounds in garlic: Allicin, vinyldithiin, ajoene and diallyl polysulfides". Experimental and Therapeutic Medicine. 19 (2): 1550–1553. doi:10.3892/etm.2019.8388. PMC 6966194. PMID 32010337.
- Oehrl, Sigmund (2025). "On the iconography of the gold foil figures from Hauge". AmS-Skrifter (29): 161–170. doi:10.31265/ndsdkk69.
- Steinsland, Gro; Vogt, Kari (1981). ""Aukinn ertu Uolse ok vpp vm tekinn" En religionshistorisk analyse av Vǫlsaþáttr i Flateyjarbók". Arkiv för nordisk filologi (in Norwegian). 96.
- Sundqvist, Olof (2015). An Arena for Higher Powers. doi:10.1163/9789004307483. ISBN 978-90-04-30748-3.
