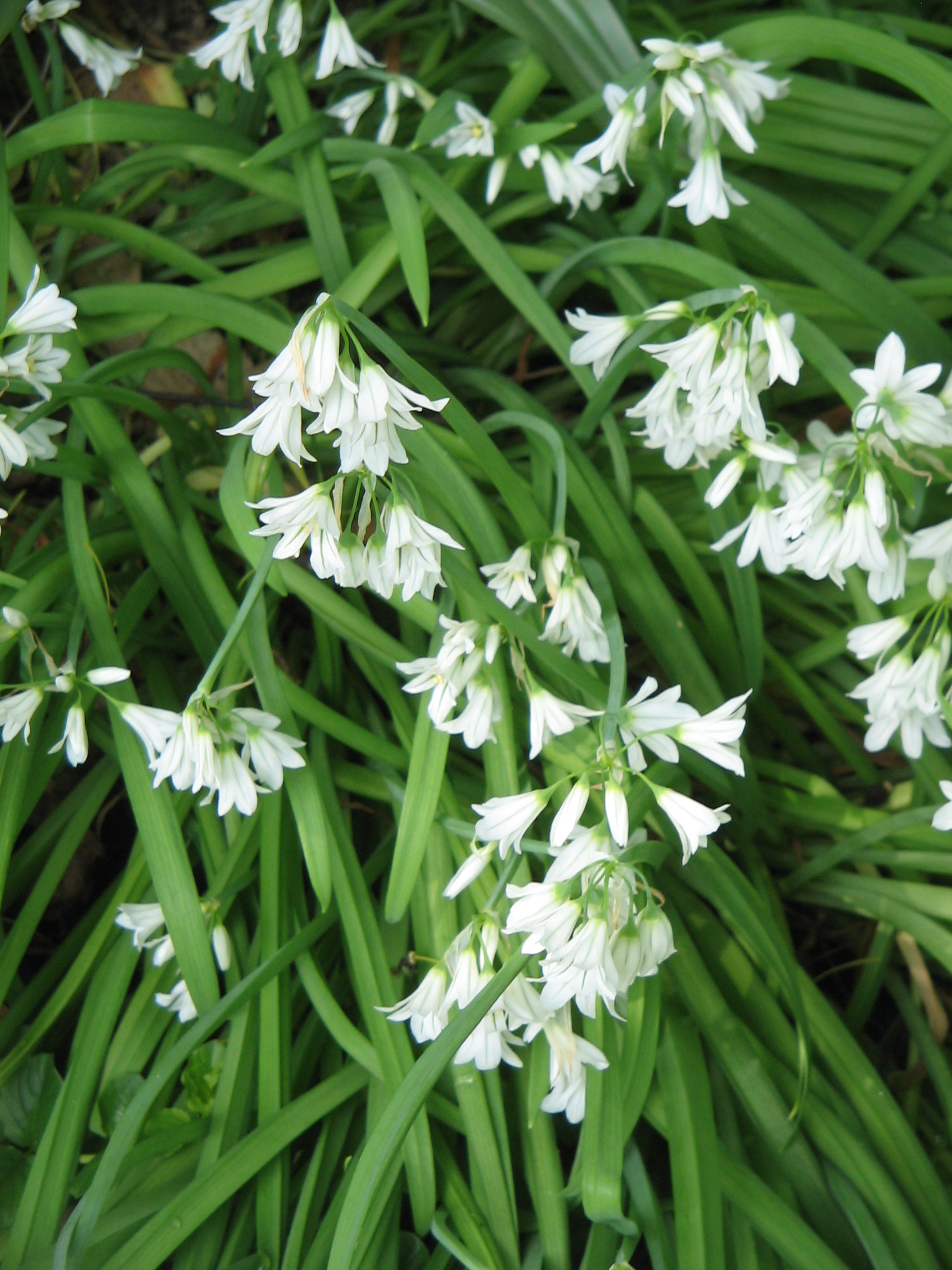

Conservation status
- Least Concern (IUCN 3.1)

Scientific classification
- Kingdom: Plantae
- Clade: Tracheophytes
- Clade: Angiosperms
- Clade: Monocots
- Order: Asparagales
- Family: Amaryllidaceae
- Subfamily: Allioideae
- Genus: Allium
- Subgenus: A. subg. Amerallium
- Species: A. triquetrum

Binomial name
- Allium triquetrum L.

Synonyms
- Allium medium G.Don; Allium opizii Wolfner; Allium triquetrum var. bulbiferum Batt. & Trab.; Allium triquetrum f. normale (L.) Maire & Weiller; Allium triquetrum var. typicum (L.) Regel; Briseis triquetra (L.) Salisb.

= Allium triquetrum =

Three-cornered leek

Species of flowering plant

Allium triquetrum is a bulbous flowering plant in the genus Allium native to the Mediterranean basin. It is known in English as three-cornered leek or three-cornered garlic, in Australia as angled onion, and in New Zealand as onion weed. Both the English name and the specific epithet triquetrum refer to the three-cornered shape of the flower stalks.

== Description ==
Allium triquetrum produces stems that are 17–60 cm (6 3/4–23 1/2 in) tall and concavely triangular in cross-section. During winter and spring, each stem produces an umbel inflorescence of 4–19 flowers. The tepals are 10–18 mm (13/32–23/32 in) long and white, but with a "strong green line". Each plant has two or three narrow, linear leaves, each growing up to 15 cm (6 in) long, which have a strong onion smell when crushed.

== Distribution and habitat ==
Allium triquetrum is native to southwestern Europe, northwestern Africa, Madeira, and the Canary Islands, where it grows in meadows, woodland clearings, on river banks, and roadside verges from sea level to an elevation of 850 metres (2,790 ft). It has also been introduced to Great Britain, Ireland, Azores, New Zealand, Turkey, Australia, California, Oregon, and South America, and is a declared noxious weed in some of those places. It has been recorded as an alien at a garden waste site on Howth Head, Ireland.

== Culinary uses ==
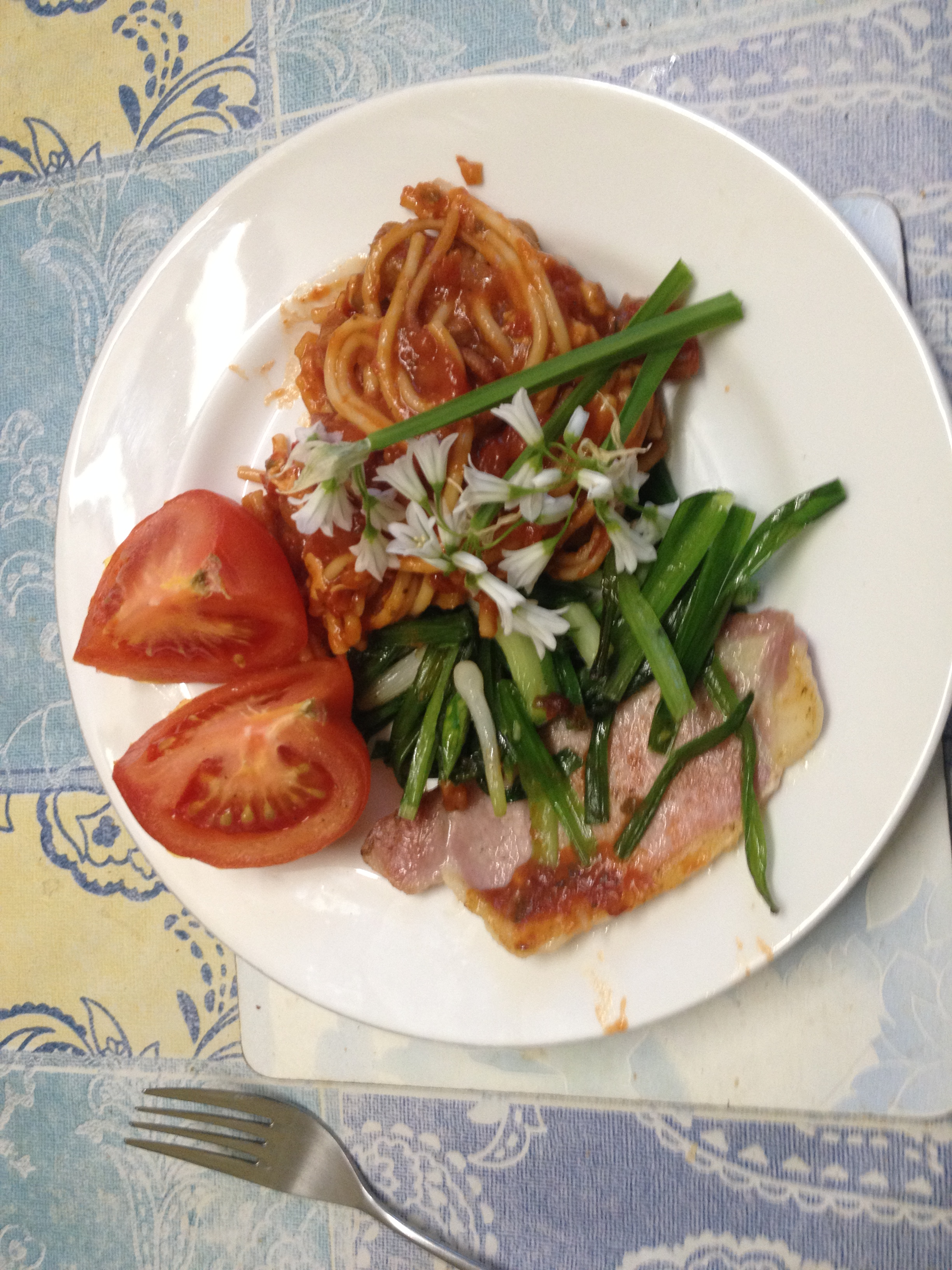
Fried allium triquetrum with raw flowers (all edible)

All parts of the plant, from the bulb to the flowers, are edible fresh or cooked. It can be used in dishes similarly to spring onions and wild onions, as it is similar both morphologically and in taste.
