= Gullgubber =

Nordic gold figures

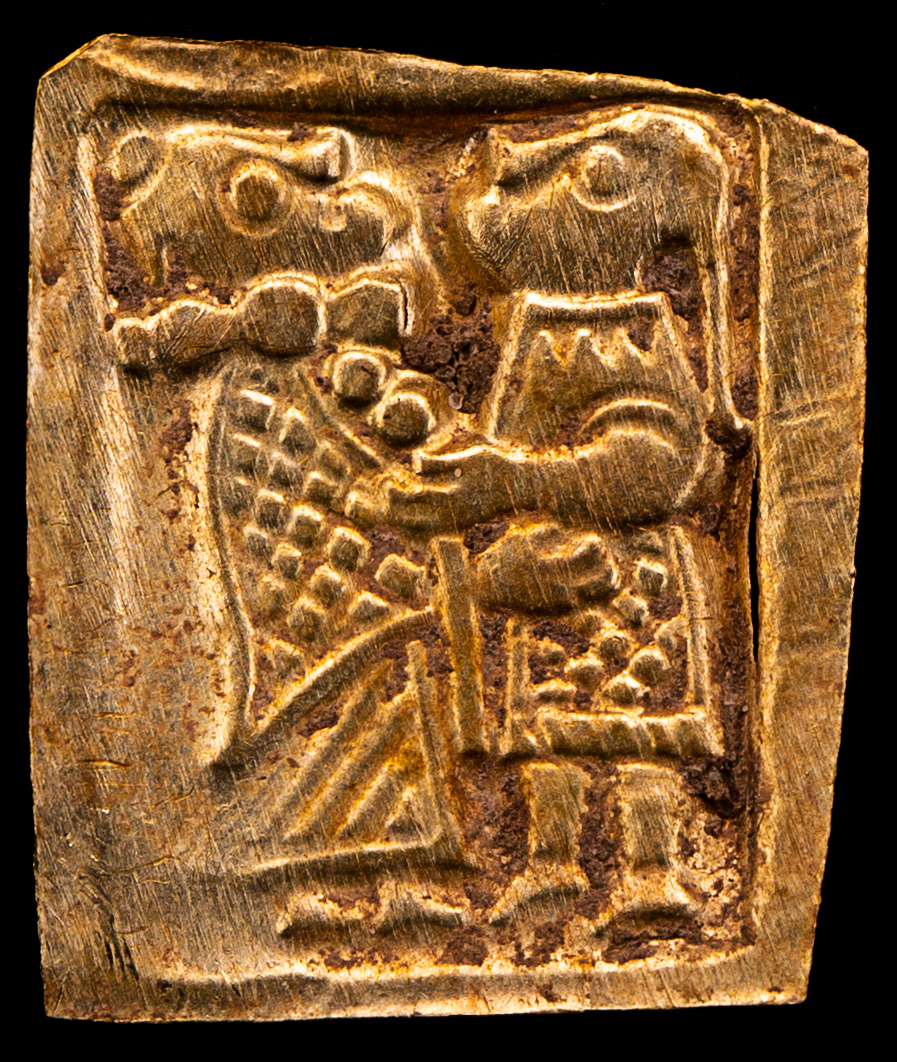
Gold foil figure from c. AD 700, found at Aska in Hagebyhöga, Sweden, in 2020.

Gullgubber (Norwegian, pronounced [ˈɡʉ̀lːˌɡʉbːər]) or guldgubber (Danish, pronounced [ˈkulˌkupɐ]), guldgubbar (Swedish, pronounced [ˈɡɵ̂lːdˌɡɵbːar]), are art-objects, amulets, or offerings found in Scandinavia and dating to the Nordic Iron Age. They consist of thin pieces of beaten gold (occasionally silver), usually between 1 and 2 cm^{2} (0.16 and 0.31 sq in). in size, usually stamped with a motif, and are the oldest examples of toreutics in Northern Europe.

The word gullgubbe means "little old man of gold" and is taken from a report published in 1791 by Nils Henrik Sjöborg, in which he said that villagers in Ravlunda, Scania, who found them in the dunes called them guldgubbar.

Approximately 3,000 gullgubber have been found, from approximately 30 sites in Norway, Sweden, and the greatest number in Denmark. No fewer than 2,350 were found at the settlement of Sorte Muld on the Danish island of Bornholm, while over 100 were found at Lundeborg, near Gudme on the Danish island of Funen, and 122 at Uppåkra, Scania, Sweden. Relatively few gullgubber have so far been found in Norway, although 19 were found during excavations at Vingrom Church in Oppland county, Norway, between 2003 and 2005, and the distribution of finds may be affected by modern circumstances as much as the political situation at the time they were laid down.

They date to the late Iron Age, from the end of the Migration Age to the early Viking Age, particularly what is referred to in Norway as the Merovingian era, in Sweden as the Vendel era, from 550 to about 800, but can be hard to date because they are often found in contexts that do not establish date. It seems likely that they replaced bracteates, which require far more metal, after obtaining gold from the Byzantine Empire became difficult.

== Iconography and purpose ==
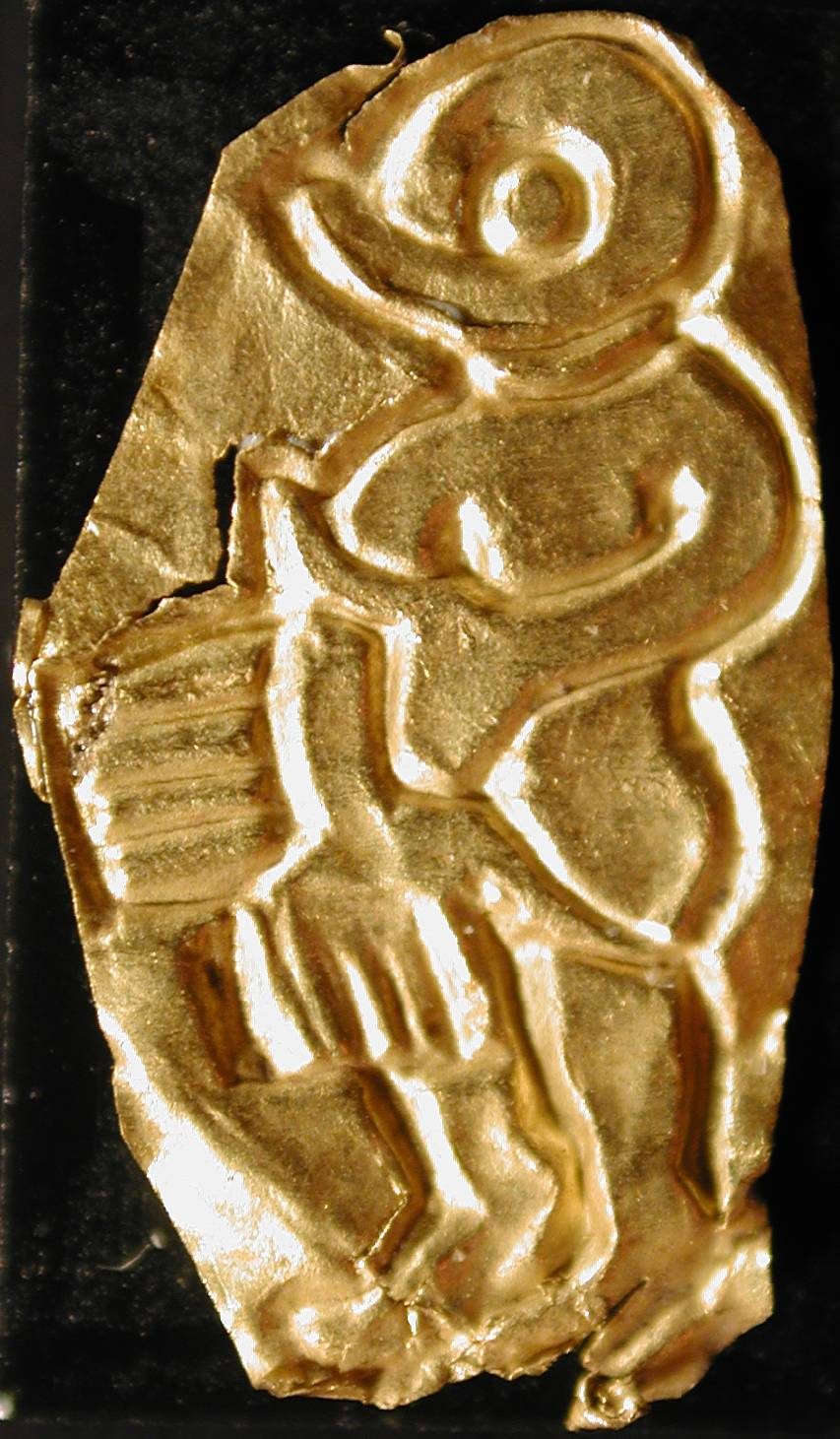
A "wraith" gullgubbe

Many of the gullgubber that have been found in Norway and Sweden depict a man and a woman facing each other, sometimes embracing, sometimes with a branch or a tree visible between them. Sometimes the figures' knees are bent and they may be dancing. They are almost always clothed, with the clothes generally depicted carefully and more formal than casual. Some have only a single figure, either male or female, or an animal. A few are unstamped cutouts. Sharon Ratke, in her dissertation on the gullgubber, has added a further category of "wraiths" and suggests that they may indicate that some gullgubber were a tribute to the dead or to travellers. She rejects the notion of dancing, interpreting those figures as static and classing them among the wraiths.

A common interpretation of the motif of the man and woman on the gullgubber is that it symbolises the sacred marriage between the Vanir-god Freyr and the jötunn Gerðr, which we know of from the Eddic poem Skírnismál. Some have interpreted the tree branch as a reference to the grove, Barri, where Gerðr agrees to meet Freyr; others have noted its resemblance to the Garden Angelica, a plant associated with fertility, or leeks, which have a prominent role in Germanic paganism. The thinking is that the deposition of the gullgubber was intended to ensure fertility, or that it was intended as a depiction of the mythical pair who gave rise to a chieftainly line. From historical sources, for example, we know that the Yngling line traced its ancestry to Fjölnir, son of Gerðr and Freyr.

Recent finds have somewhat changed the view of gullgubber. Almost 2,500 have been found at Sorte Muld, on the Danish island of Bornholm, by far the highest number at any site. And in 2000–2004, 122, the second highest number, were found not far away at Uppåkra, Scania, Sweden. Several of those found at the two sites are similar; some were made using the same dies or patrices, and four dies and part of a fifth were found at Uppåkra, which was therefore presumably the point of manufacture for at least some of the Sorte Muld gullgubber. In addition, some gullgubber found at some other sites also show strong similarities to some from Uppåkra, and some from Uppåkra are unusually sharp in their details. At Uppåkra they were found in postholes and wall ditches of a building that is interpreted as a heathen hof partly on the basis of their presence as votive offerings, which is how they are now generally interpreted.

Recent attempts have been made to interpret the gestures of the couples depicted on gullgubber in terms of medieval sources such as the Sachsenspiegel, as denoting betrothal, for example. However, at both Uppåkra and Sorte Muld, the majority of the gullgubber do not depict couples. At Uppåkra, most depict men, a smaller number depict women, and only a few depict couples. Some iconographic features of the single figures – a thumb to the mouth gesture associated with being a seer as in representations of the legend of Sigurð, a group of figures with clubs and two others with staffs or sceptres of differing lengths – have been seen as relating to individual Norse gods.

== Locations of finds ==
Gullgubber have been found at 42 sites in Norway, Sweden, and in greatest numbers in Denmark. Some of the most notable locations are:

- Borg, Vestvågøy Municipality, Nordland county, Norway
- Borge, Fredrikstad Municipality, Østfold county, Norway
- Mære Church, Steinkjer Municipality, Trøndelag county, Norway – 9th century, found during excavations in 1968
- Vingrom Church, Lillehammer Municipality, Innlandet county, Norway – found during excavations between 2003 and 2005
- Kongsvik, Tjeldsund Municipality, Nordland county, Norway – found in the 1740s
- Hauge, Klepp Municipality, Rogaland county, Norway – approx. 700-800 C.E.
- Slöinge, Falkenberg Municipality, Halland County, Sweden – approx. 690 C.E.
- Helgö, Ekerö Municipality, Stockholm County, Sweden
- Uppåkra, Staffanstorp Municipality, Scania County, Sweden – 111 found
- Sorte Muld, Bornholm Municipality, Region Hovedstaden, Denmark – 2,480 found, dated together with those at Uppåkra to the 6th century
- Lundeborg, Svendborg Municipality, Region Syddanmark, Denmark – about 100
- Västra Vång, Ronneby Municipality, Blekinge County, Sweden – 75 found in 2025, the third-highest number in Sweden.

About 1800 gullgubber are on display in the Bornholm Museum in Rønne. Most of the gullgubber from Uppåkra can be seen at the Historical Museum at Lund University. The one's from Västra Vång can be found at the Blekinge museum in the town of Karlskrona.

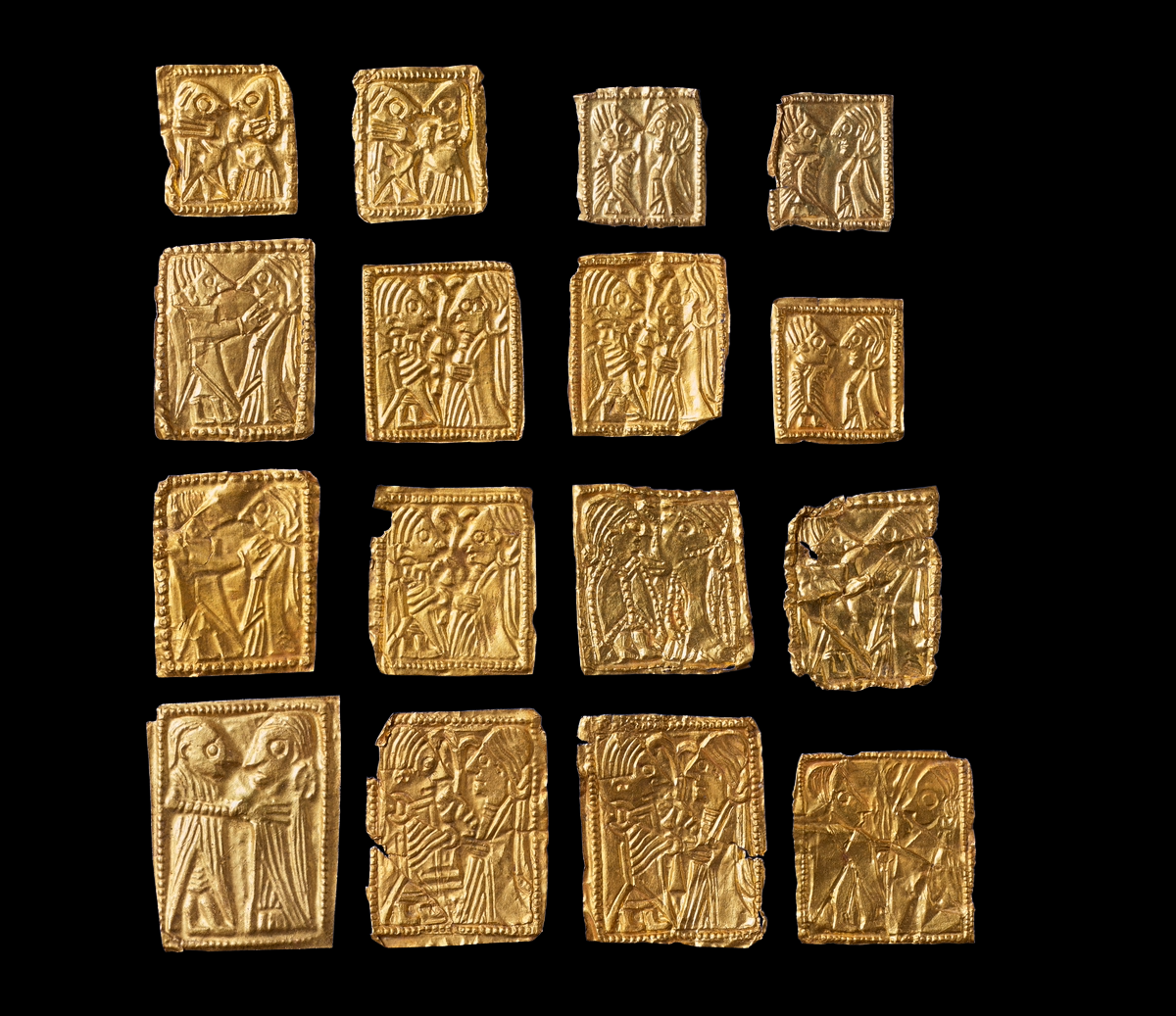
Finds from Hauge, Rogaland

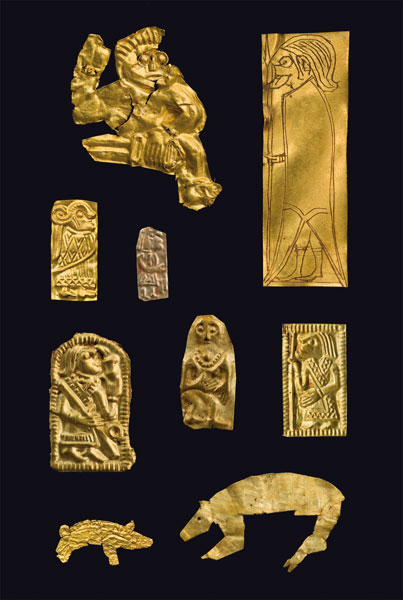
6th–7th-century gullgubber from Sorte Muld, Bornholm

== Sources ==
- Lamm, Jan Peder (2004). "Figural Gold Foils Found in Sweden". In Clarke, Helen; Lamm, Kristina (eds.). Excavations at Helgö XVI: Exotic and Sacral Finds from Helgö. Stockholm: Almqvist & Wiksell. ISBN 917402339X.
- Rundkvist, Martin; Löfving, Axel; Gustavsson, Rudolf; Heimdahl, Jens & Viberg, Andreas (December 2023). "Gold-foil figures and human skulls in the royal hall at Aska, Hagebyhöga, Östergötland". Antiquity. 97 (396): 1534–1547. doi:10.15184/aqy.2023.157.
- Watt, Margrethe (1992). "Die Goldblechfiguren ('guldgubber') aus Sorte Muld, Bornholm". In Hauck, Karl (ed.). Der historische Horizont der Götterbild-Amulette aus der Übergangsepoche von der Spätantike zum Frühmittelalter: Bericht über das Colloquium vom 28.11.-1.12.1988 in der Werner-Reimers-Stiftung, Bad Homburg (in Norwegian). Göttingen: Vandenhoeck & Ruprecht. pp. 195–227. ISBN 3525825870.
- Watt, Margrethe (2008). "Guldgubber". In Adamsen, Christian; Lund Hansen, Ulla; Nielsen, Finn Ole; Watt, Margrethe (eds.). Sorte Muld (in Norwegian). Rønne: Bornholms Museum og Kulturarvsstyrelsen. pp. 42–53. ISBN 978-8788179118.
