= Völsa þáttr =

Norse short story

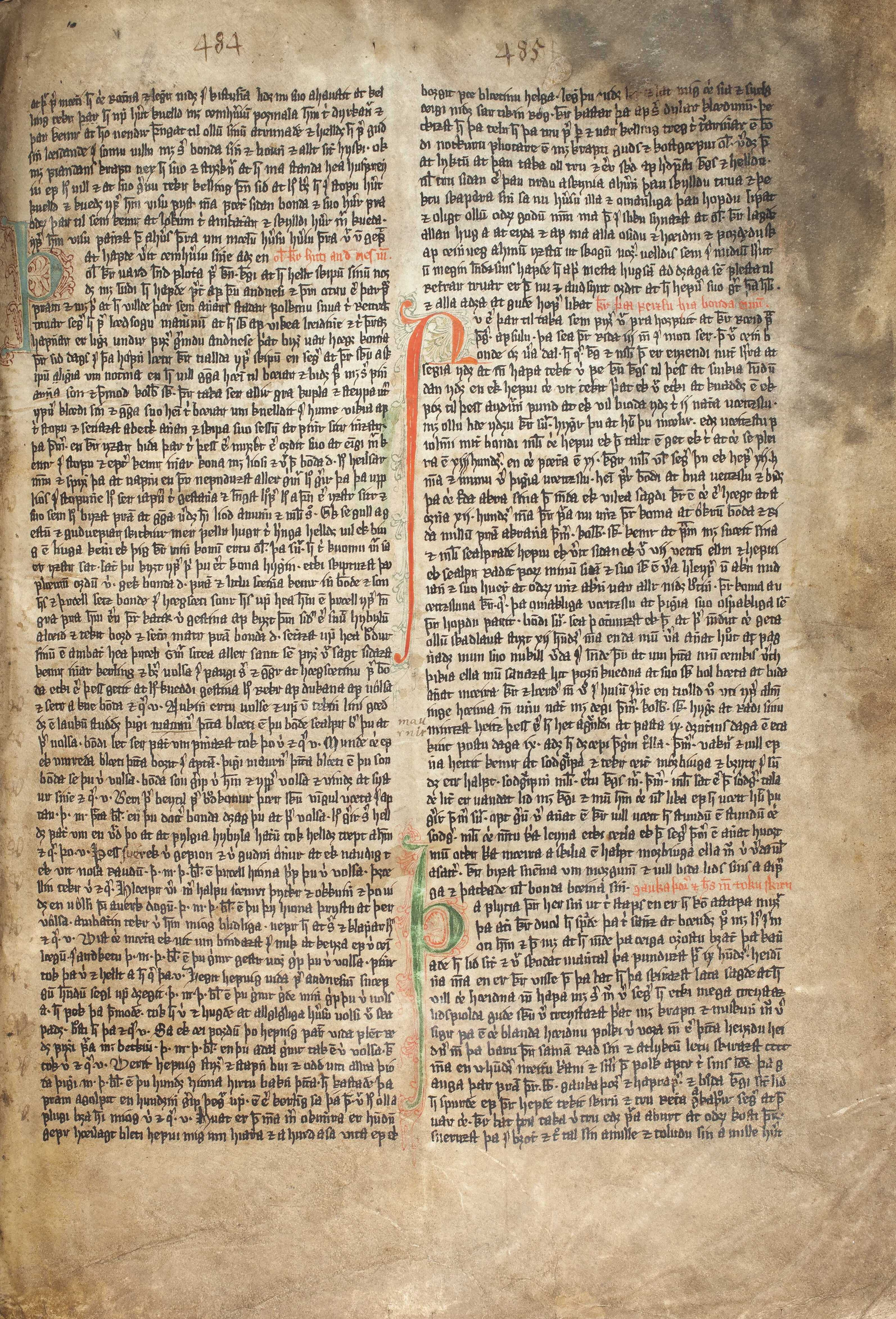
Page of Vǫlsa þáttr, in Flateyjarbók

Vǫlsa þáttr is a short story which is only extant in the Flateyjarbók codex, where it is found in a chapter of Óláfs saga helga. It is probably from the 14th century but takes place in 1029, when Scandinavia was still largely pagan, and it appears to preserve traditions of a pagan phallus cult, the vǫlsi.

== Worship ==
The story goes that an old man and an old woman lived with their brisk son, intelligent daughter and several thralls on a promontory far from other people.

After one thrall butchered a horse and was about to throw away the horse's penis, the boy ran past, took it, and went to the place where his mother, sister, and the slave woman were sitting. There he joked at the slave woman, telling her the organ would not be dull between her legs, whereupon the slave woman laughed. The daughter asked her brother to throw away the disgusting object, but her old mother rose and said it was a useful thing that should not be thrown away. She wrapped it in a cloth of linen together with onions and herbs to conserve it and put it in her coffer.

Every evening in the autumn, she took it out of the coffer and prayed to it as to her god and had the rest of the household take part. She recited a verse over it, handed it to her husband who did the same, and so on until every one had taken part.

== Enter King Olaf ==
One day, when king Olaf II of Norway was fleeing king Canute the Great, he came by their promontory. He had heard of their worship and wanted to convert them to the Christian faith. He went to their abode and only brought with him Finnr Árnason and Þormóðr Kolbrúnarskáld, and they were all wearing grey cloaks to hide their identities.

They entered the house and, when it was dark, they met the daughter who asked them who they were. They all answered that their name was Grímr (hooded). The girl was not fooled and said she recognized King Olaf, who asked her to keep quiet about it.

They then met the rest of the household and were invited for dinner. The old woman came last and carried the vǫlsi (the penis). She put it in her husband's lap and recited a poem, saying: "May the giantess (Mǫrnir) accept this holy object". The husband accepted it and recited a poem including the same phrase, and this continued until everybody in the company, but the king, had recited a poem with this phrase.

When it was the king's turn, he revealed himself and preached about Christianity, but the old woman was very skeptical, whereas her husband was very interested. Finally, they all agreed to be baptized by the king's chaplain and they remained Christian ever after.

== See also ==
- Ashvamedha
- Blót
- Horses in Germanic paganism
