= Augvald =

Norse king

Augvald (Old Norse: Ǫgvaldr) was a semi-legendary Norwegian petty king portrayed in the legendary Norse sagas. If considered historical, reconstructed estimates based on saga information would have Augvald living some time in the 7th century AD. His kingdom was said to have been based in Jøsursheid, somewhere in the interior of south-western Norway. After a number of naval battles he succeeded in conquering the islands off the western coast of Rogaland. He subsequently moved his kingdom's seat to the north-east of Karmøy, the largest of those islands and adjacent to the strategically important Karmsundet strait, to a site later given the name Avaldsnes, after the king. Augvald's kingdom further expanded to incorporate parts of what is today south-western Hordaland.

Augvald had several daughters, including two who notably fought alongside him as so-called shield-maidens, or female warriors. He owned and worshipped a sacred cow, which he always kept with him, believing he owed his victories to the cow and the power of its milk. Augvald was killed during a battle with his rival Ferking (in the Saga of Olaf Tryggvason called Varinn), the native king of western Karmøy, with whom his story is interlinked.

== Sources ==
Norse sagas telling parts of the story of Augvald include the Saga of Olaf Tryggvason (both by Snorri Sturluson in Heimskringla and by Oddr Snorrason), the Saga of Half & His Heroes and the Flateyjarbok. He also appears in the later Historia rerum Norvegicarum and other works of the Icelandic historian Thormodus Torfæus, who lived and worked in Kopervik, Karmøy. In addition, Augvald is mentioned in the Avaldsnes parish register, and in local Karmøy legends. Scholars have been very sceptical about the reliability of the legendary sagas, which were dismissed as being of little value even in the early 20th century, before the establishment of general source criticism. The legendary sagas' value as sources has not been re-evaluated in recent times.

== Name ==
Augvald's name (originally Ǫgvaldr), later attested in the genitive in af Awaldzstadom (‘Awald’s settlements’, dative plural) in Aslak Bolt's cadastre (Norwegian "Aslak Bolts Jordebok") (A.B 52), later abbreviated to Ofstad (as recorded in Professor Ole Ryghs publicly commissioned study of old personalnames, titled "Gamle Personnavne i Norske stedsnavne"), has been interpreted in several different ways, although usually taken to mean a combination of the words "awe" and "violence" (Old Norse agi + valdr) or "awe" + "wield", meaning something like "respect-wielder" or "fear-wielder" or "he who is held in awe," derived from the West-Nordic agi meaning 'fear'. Other interpretations include "the ruler of the coast", with ǫgð meaning stretch of coastline, or "the ruler of the island", with ogn meaning dangerous waters/island, which would imply that the king's name might originally have been either Ǫgðvaldr or Ognvaldr.

It has also been suggested that Augvald was probably an epithet gained in adulthood rather than a given name, and there has been speculation that Augvald was actually Harald Agdekonge. Some historians have alternatively suggested that Augvald could have been a title, possibly shared by many, rather than the name of a single individual, but the saga's account of Augvald may still have centred on one particularly notable individual.

== Background ==
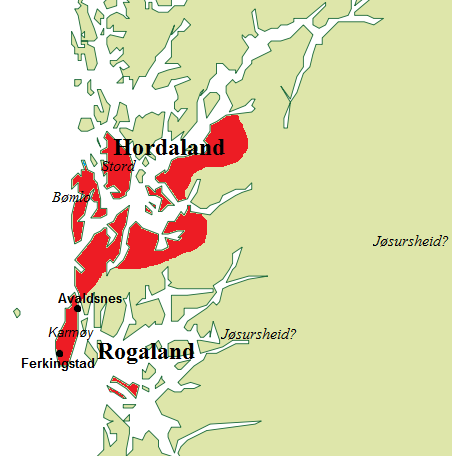
Augvald's possible kingdom (in red) largely coincides with sites connected to the 8th-century kingdom of the monarch from the Storhaug burial mound, identified through archaeological excavations. This lends credibility to saga accounts of sites integral to a contemporary kingdom.

The sagas do not say when Augvald lived, but an early suggestion by Torfæus placed Augvald in the 3rd century AD. Modern estimates have been made based on two of his reported descendants, Geirmund and Håvard Heljarskinn, who are said to have settled Iceland as "old men" when Harald Fairhair consolidated his power in Norway. According to an estimate by Marit Synnøve Vea based on generation-cycles of 30 years (though she notes 25 years might be more accurate), Augvald would have lived in the Migration Period, with slightly varied interpretations around 580–630, around 600 or in the early 7th century. Arnfrid Opedal has considered a shorter generation-cycle of 20 years, which would place Augvald 90 years later, at the end of the 7th century.

To justify their right to rule, Norse royal families, among other things, traced their bloodlines back to divine creatures. As a member of the West-Nordic royal families, Augvald traced his ancestry back to the ancient giant Fornjót (likely another name for Ymir). According to the sagas, Augvald was the son of Rognvald, in turn the son of Rugalf, son of Gard Agdi, son of Nór—a direct descendant of Fornjót. Augvald originally had his throne at "Roga" in "Jøsursheid". Historian P. A. Munch located the name Jøsureid in the present-day Kviteseid Municipality in western Telemark, and thus placed Augvald's kingdom in the mountains between Rogaland and Telemark, concluding that the kingdom had stretched to western Telemark. Per Hernæs has on the other hand identified Jøsursheid as an old name for the moorland within Jøsenfjorden in the present-day Hjelmeland Municipality, although he questions whether conditions in the area could have allowed for the rise of a great chieftain such as Augvald.

Described as battle-hungry, Augvald carried out raids into foreign territory, gaining great wealth and honour as a result. After a series of successful naval battles, he went on to conquer the land of the Holmrygr ("island-Rugi") people, based on the islands off the western coast of Rogaland. He banished the former chieftains from the newly conquered land, and set up his new base at the most favourable location on Karmøy, the largest island in Rogaland. The site he chose was later named Avaldsnes, after Augvald. Based on archaeological findings, it is believed that the ambitions of the increasingly powerful Norwegian chieftains of the time were influenced by the Merovingian Franks, and especially Dagobert and his empire. As a builder of dynasties, Augvald has also been compared to Clovis.

Convinced that his cow was responsible for his victories, Augvald worshipped it and always kept it by his side. He also believed that the cow's milk provided special strength and vitality. According to some accounts, the cow's name was Audhumla (after Auðumbla), and it wore a golden collar around its neck.

Augvald had several daughters, including two who were female warriors, known as shield-maidens (Norwegian: skjøldmøyer), and who fought alongside their father in all his battles. Augvald's (unnamed) queen also gave birth to a son, Jøsur, when Augvald was away hunting with his men. Jøsur was raised by Augvald's earl Gunnvald on Stord.

== Rivalry with Ferking and death ==
Augvald had set up his base in the north-eastern part of Karmøy, but the western part of the island was still ruled by another king, Ferking. The two were not enemies at first, but that changed after Augvald and his men attended a midwinter sacrificial banquet in Ferkingstad. What started as a friendly visit turned sour, and Augvald returned home with his men, leaving his daughters held captive at Ferkingstad.

Ferking apparently could not tolerate Augvald's overlordship of Karmøy, and he went north with his army, meeting Augvald and his army at Skeie, near Avaldsnes. In the resulting battle there many fatalities, but no clear victor. The conclusive battle took place at the Field of Stava (Stavasletta), near Ferkingstad. Ferking and his men hid between two gorges, waiting for Augvald to appear. In the fierce battle that followed Augvald and his cow were among the many who lost their lives. When his two daughters saw that Augvald was dead, they jumped into a river and drowned.

According to Snorri Sturluson, Augvald was killed by a man named Varin, although the Flateyjarbok says it was someone called Dixin. The Saga of Half & His Heroes names Augvald's killer as "Hækling's men", which possibly only refers to caped men.

== Aftermath ==
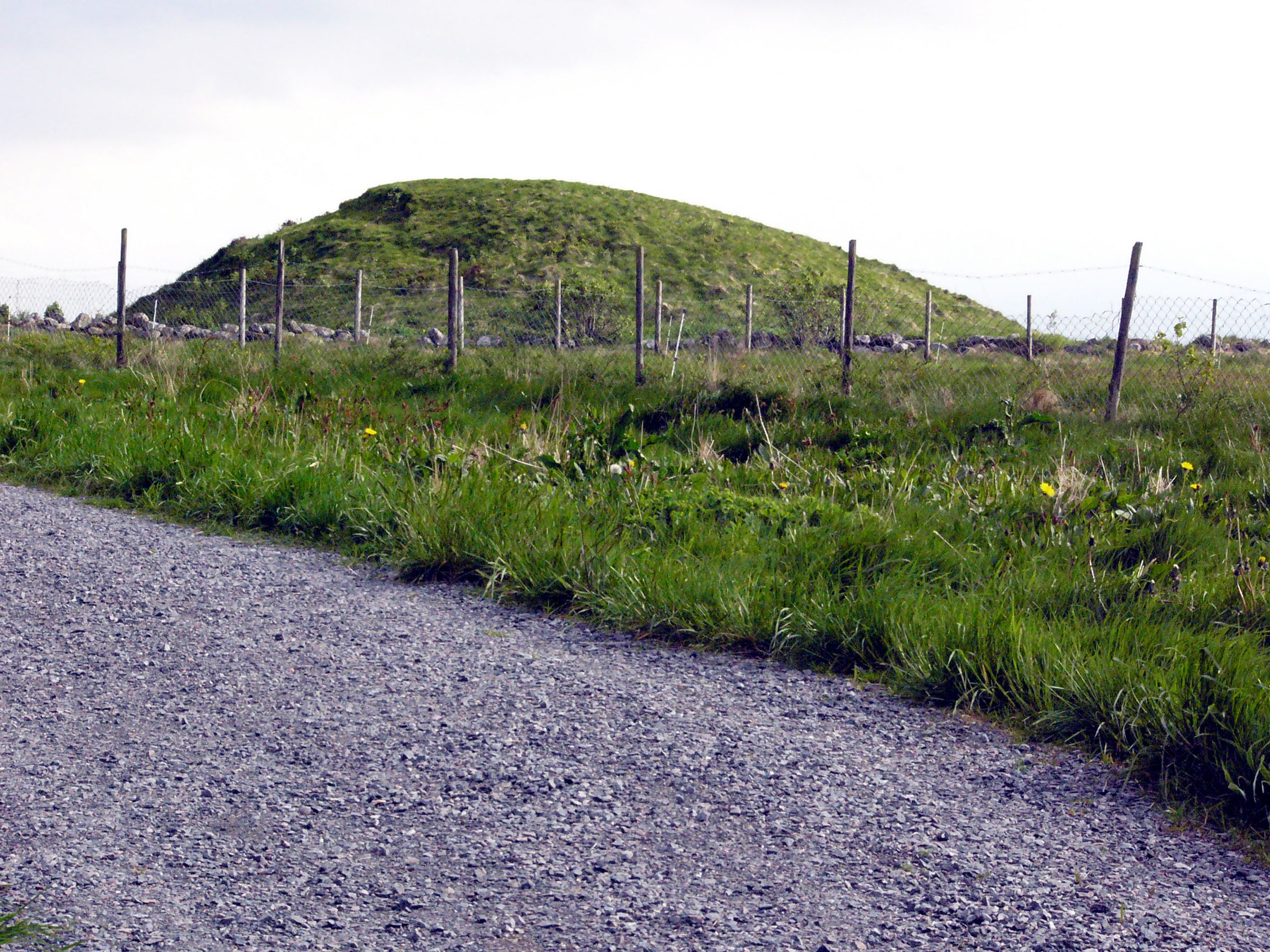
One of many burial mounds in Karmøy

According to historical sources, Augvald and his cow were taken from the battlefield and buried at Avaldsnes. In his Saga of Olav Tryggvason, Oddr Snorrason writes that Tryggvason excavated two mounds on Karmøy, revealing the bones of a man in one and those of a cow in the other. Local legends contradict Augvald's burial at Avaldsnes, stating instead that he was buried in Ferkingstad, on the south side of the 12th-century churchyard. A large memorial stone, still standing, was raised outside the churchyard in memory of Augvald.

In the generations following Augvald's death two royal dynasties appear to fight over the same region, the "Vikar dynasty" of Agder and Rogaland, and the "Jøsur dynasty" of Hordaland and Rogaland. If Augvald was indeed Harald Agdekonge, as suggested by some modern historians, Vikar and Jøsur could have been two warring brothers. In any event, Augvald's son Jøsur became king of Rogaland after his father's death, and reconquered parts of Hordaland. He was in turn succeeded by his son Hjør, who was buried in Rogaland. Hjør's son, Hjørleiv the Womanizer, was king of Hordaland and Rogaland, and mounted expeditions to Bjarmaland and Denmark. He eventually also captured a kingdom in Zealand, in Denmark. Hjørleiv's son Half appears as the protagonist in the Saga of Half & His Heroes.

== Family tree ==
The following tables show the most common rendering of the family tree attributed to Augvald in the various sagas, including his ancestors and descendants.

Patrilineal descent
1. Fornjót
2. Kári
3. Frosti
4. Snær
5. Thorri
6. Nór
7. Gard Agdi
8. Rugalf
9. Rognvald
10. Augvald
Descendants

Augvald
Jøsur
Hjør
Hjørleiv	Hild^{1}
Half	Hjørolv
Hjør Halfson	Dagny^{2}
NN^{3}	Flein Hjørson
Ljufvina^{4}	Hjør Fleinson
Geirmund; Heljarskinn	Håvard; Heljarskinn

^{1} Hild, daughter of Høgne of Njardø
^{2} Dagny, daughter of Hake Håmundson
^{3} Unnamed daughter of Danish king Eystein
^{4} Ljufvina, princess from Bjarmaland

== Bibliography ==
- Hernæs, Per (1997). Karmøys historie – som det stiger frem. Fra istid til 1050. Karmøy kommune. ISBN 978-82-7859-003-4.
- Opedal, Arnfrid (1998). De glemte skipsgravene: Makt og myter pa Avaldsnes. Arkeologisk museum i Stavanger. ISBN 978-82-7760-043-7.
