= Leikn =

Norse mythical character

Leikn (Old Norse: [ˈlɛikn]) is a female jötunn in Norse mythology. The 10th-century skald Vetrliði Sumarliðason lists her among the jötnar killed by the thunder god Thor.

== Name ==
The Old Norse name Leikn has been translated as 'trickery'. Stemming from a Proto-Norse form reconstructed as *laikīnō, it is related to the Old Norse leikni ('bewitchment'), and to the Old English scīn-lǣce ('sorceress').

== Attestations ==
The death of Leikn is mentioned in a lausavísa composed by Vetrliði Sumarliðason which praises Thor for having killed giants and giantesses:

Leggi brauzt Leiknar, lamðir Þrívalda, steypðir Starkeði, stétt of Gjǫlp dauða. —Edith Marold's edition	You broke Leikn's bones, you pounded Thrivaldi you cast down Starkad, you stood over the dead Gialp. —Skáldskaparmál (4), Faulkes' translation

Leikn's name was used by skalds in kennings. Hallfreðr vandræðaskáld thus uses the kenning "Leikn's horse" (hestr Leiknar) for a wolf (Óláfsdrápa, 6) and Hallvarðr háreksblesi calls the raven "hawk of Leikn of points" (haukr Leiknar odda) that is "hawk of valkyrie" (Knútsdrápa, 6).

Leikn is also listed in the þulur.
