= Sigtrygg =

Old Norse given name

Sigtrygg (Sigtryggr) is an Old Norse given name, composed of the elements sig 'victory' and trygg 'trusty, true'. It is cognate with the Anglo-Saxon Sihtric.

In Norse-Gaelic Ireland (9th to 11th centuries) rendered as Sitric or Sihtric (the patronymic Sigtryggsson as mac Sitriuc).

The name is only rarely given in modern Scandinavian countries; it is mostly encountered in Iceland, in the form Sigtryggur, with 99 entries for the name in the Icelandic white pages as of 2013.

== People called Sigtrygg ==
The names may refer to any of the following people:

- Sigtryggr, one of the names of Óðinn according to Óðins nöfn.
- Sigtryg, a legendary king of Sweden according to Gesta Danorum. Father of Gróa. Slain by Gram.
- Kings of Dublin:
  - Sigtrygg Ivarsson, 888–893
  - Sigtrygg Caech (Sigtrygg Gael), 917–921, king of York 921–927
  - Sigtrygg, 941–943
  - Sigtrygg Silkbeard Olafsson, 989–1036
- Sigtrygg Gnupasson, a 10th-century Danish king of the House of Olaf
- Sigtrygg of Nerike, a Swede who met Saint Olaf
- Sitric the Dane, an 11th-century ruler of Waterford
- Sitric mac Ualgairg, king of Breifne 1256/7
- Sigtryggur Baldursson, musician, best known as a member of the icelandic band The Sugarcubes

== See also ==
- Mac Sitric, Irish masculine surname
- Sitric Roads, Stoneybatter, County Dublin
- Irish people
- Norse people
