= Víkar =

Legendary Norwegian king

- Haraldsson
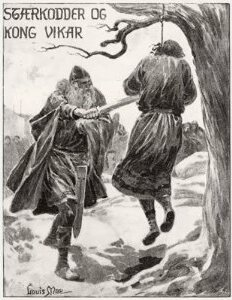
- The murder of Víkar by Starkad, drawn for an 1898 publication of the Gesta Danorum.

King of Agder
- Predecessor: Herþjóf Hunþjófsson
- Successor: Harald Víkarsson
- Cause of death: Murder
- Issue: Harald; Neri

Víkar (Old Norse nominative case form Víkarr; Latin Wicarus) was a legendary Norwegian petty king mentioned in multiple legendary sagas. Gautreks saga refers to him as Víkar Haraldsson, king of Agder, while Halfs saga refers to him as Víkar Alreksson, king of Hordaland. In the Gesta Danorum, he is referred to as Wicarus, king of Norway.

In Gautreks saga and the Gesta Danorum, Víkar and Starkad Stóvirksson were brought up together in the court of Víkar's father, Harald Agder-king. One night, Víkar was kidnapped by Herþjóf, king of Hordaland, who also murdered Harald. Víkar took his revenge against Herþjóf some years later, becoming king of Agder, Hordaland, and Hardanger in the process. Gautreks saga goes on to detail how Víkar came to rule the Uplands and Telemark with Starkad fighting for his army. Eventually, Víkar's ships were becalmed while sailing between Agder and Hordaland. In both accounts, Víkar was then murdered by Starkad. Gautreks saga says that Odin revealed himself to Starkad, demanding Víkar's death, while the Gesta Danorum says that Starkad stabbed Víkar in what was intended to be a mock execution without a direct appearance by Odin. This version of Víkar fathered two sons, Harald and Neri. Following his death, Harald became king of Agder and Hordaland while Neri became jarl of Telemark and the Uplands.

In Hálfs saga, Víkar is a minor character who takes revenge against Jösur, king of Rogaland, following the death of his father, Alrek. The Ættartolur claims that Alrek was a descendant of Skelfir, progenitor of the Scylfings. Hálfs saga does not relate how Víkar died. This version of Víkar had one son, Vatnar. The Ættartolur claims that Vatnar had two sons, Ímald and Eirík. In the Heimskringla, Eirík's daughter Gyda became the concubine of Harald Fairhair.

== Biography ==
=== Víkar Haraldsson/Wicarus ===
According to Gautreks saga, Víkar was the son of a king of Agdir (Agðir) named Harald Agder-king (Haraldr inn egðski) whose ancestry is not given. After the death of Starkad's father Stóvirk (Stórvirkr), young Starkad was brought up in Harald's court along with Harald's son Víkar. King Herthjóf (Herþjófr) of Hördaland made a surprise attack one night, slew Harald Agder-king and took his son Víkar hostage to ensure the behavior of Harald's former subjects. This Herthjóf was son of King Hunthjóf (Hunþjófr) son of Fridthjóf the Bold (Friðþjófr inn frækna), the protagonist of Fridthjófs saga ins frækna.

But after some years Víkar gathered some champions to himself, including the young Starkad, made a surprise attack on Herthjóf's hall, and slew King Herthjóf and thirty of his men. Víkar then became king of Agdir, Jadar (Jaðar, modern Jaederen in Hördaland), and Hardang (Harðangr, modern Hardanger) which Herthjóf had also ruled. The tale then tells of Víkar's successful battle at Lake Vænir (Lake Vänern) against King Sísar (Sísarr, conjectured to refer to the Slavic title of цѣсарь/цьсарь) of Kiev, of Víkar's defeat of Herthjóf's brother King Geirthjóf (Geirþjófr) of the Uplands in a war in which Geirthjóf fell in the First Battle of Telemark, and how Víkar then took over not only the Uplands but also Telemark which belonged to Geirthjóf's brother Fridthjóf who was not there at the time. When Fridthjóf returned and attacked, Víkar defeated him with the aid of King Óláf the Keen-eyed (Óláfr inn skyggni), king of Nærríki in Sweden (modern Närke). Fridthjóf agreed to a treaty by which his kingdom was turned over to Víkar but Fridthjóf kept his life and freedom. At the Second Battle of Telemark In all these battles Starkad was Víkar's greatest warrior.

After all these victories, when sailing north from Agdir to Hördaland with a large army, Víkar was becalmed. Divination showed Odin required a sacrifice of one person chosen by lot and Víkar's lot came up each time. The decision was put off till the next day. Then Grani Horsehair (Hrosshárs-Grani), Starkad's foster father, took Stakad to a secret council of the gods and revealed himself to be Odin. After blessings and curses laid on Starkad alternately by Odin and Thor, Odin asked Starkad to send him King Víkar in payment for Odin's blessings. Starkad agreed and Odin gave Starkad a spear which Odin promised would appear to be only a reed-stalk. So Vikar met his death.

Saxo Grammaticus' account in the Gesta Danorum is short, seemingly a summary. He claims that Odin had given Starkad three times the span of a mortal life in order to commit a proportionate number of crimes. But this follows on a discussion about Odin and Thor which interrupts his story and seems out of place. The discussion may have been inspired by a fuller account such as the version in Gautrek's saga where Starkad's fate is decided by an interchange of blessings and curses laid on Starkad by Odin and Thor alternately.

For Saxo, Vikar (Wicarus) is simply "king of Norway" rather than of king of Hördaland (modern Hordaland) or some other region within Norway. After Starkad's destiny was laid on him, Starkad came to Vikar (perhaps for the first time) for the purpose of accomplishing Vikar's death. Starkad lodged with King Víkar, and so was present on the raiding expedition where Vikar was becalmed for the greater part of a year.

=== Víkar Alreksson ===
Víkar
- Alreksson

King of Hordaland
- Predecessor: Alrek Eiríksson
- Successor: Vatnar Víkarsson
- Issue: Vatnar

Hálfs saga og hálfsrekka provides a different King. Here Víkar is the son of King Alrek (Alrekr) of Hördaland with no mention of King Harald of Agdir or King Herthjóf of Hördaland. Alrek's ancestry is not given in the saga, but according to the Ættartolur (genealogies' attached to Hversu Noregr byggdist), Alrek was the son of Eirík the Eloquent (Eiríkr inn málspaki), son of Alrek, son of Eirík, son of Skjöld (Skǫldr) son of Skelfir, king of Vörs (Vǫrs), modern Voss in northern Hordaland. Skelfir was the ancestor of the Skilfings. See Scylfing for further details and comment.

Alrek dwelt at Alreksstead (Alreksstaðr, modern Alrekstad), presumably named after himself. Alrek had married Signý, daughter of an unnamed king of Vörs, but was urged by Koll (Kollr), one of his men, to also look at Geirhild (Geirhildr) daughter of Dríf (Drífr). Meanwhile, Odin came to Geirhild in the guise of a man named Hött (Hǫttr 'hood') and bargained with Geirhild that he would make her into Alrek's wife if Geirhild agreed to call on Hött in all things. Geirhild accepted. When Alrek saw Geirhild, he took her as his second wife. But Signý and Geirhild quarreled to the point that Alrek decided to give up one of them and announced he would keep whoever had brewed the best beer when he returned from his raiding. Signý called on Freyja but Geirhild prayed to Hött, who appeared before her, spat into the beer, but said he would be back to take what was between herself and the beer vat in exchange, meaning the child of Alrek in Geirhild's womb. When Alrek returned he judged Geirhild's beer the best and so kept her as his wife, but said he that foresaw her son on a gallows, sacrificed to Odin.

The account then tells how Alrek was slain by King Jösur (Jǫsurr) of Rogaland in a war Alrek made against Koll of Kollsey. Alrek had died and Jösur had already departed before Alrek's son Víkar arrived at the battlefield. But years later, when Jösur was again in Kollsey, King Víkar attacked Jösur and slew him along with all the farmers in the area, leaving only the women, whence the area was purportedly afterwards known as Kvennaherad (Kvennaherað 'Women's hundred'). War continued between King Víkar and King Jösur's son Hjör (Hjǫrr) until at last they agreed to make peace. Since Hjör and his descendants are afterwards called kings of Hördaland.

At that point Víkar is out of the story which does not relate his death, being concerned instead with Hjör, his son Hjörleif (Hjǫleifr), and then Hjörleif's son Hálf (Hálfr) who is the central figure in the saga.

== Issue ==
=== Víkar Haraldsson ===
According to Gautreks saga Víkar had two sons named Harald and Neri. During his life, Víkar made Harald the King of Telemark and Neri Jarl of the Uplands. Upon Víkar's death, the brothers came to an agreement by which Harald became King of Agdir and Hördaland and Neri became Jarl of Telemark and the Uplands.

=== Víkar Alreksson ===
According to Hálfs saga and the Ættartolur, Víkar had a son named Vatnar who was buried in Vatnar's Howe (Vatnarshaugr). Hálfs saga says that Vatnar fathered two sons, Snjall (Snjallr) and Hjall (Hjallr), whose bodies lay in the Brothers' Howe (Bræðrahaugr). In the Ættartolur, Vatnar's sons were named Ímald (Ímaldr) and Eirík. Eirík was the father of Gyda (Gyða) who married Harald Fairhair in the Heimskringla.

== Commentary ==
There are resemblances between the variant back stories of Víkar found in Gautreks saga and Hálfs saga. In both Vikar's father is slain in battle by another king and in both Víkar in turn attacked and slew that king some years later. An heir to that king then made war on Víkar, either a younger brother or a son. This war ends with a peace agreement.

That Víkar's opponents and father and descendants are differently named may in part come from varying ideas of when Víkar lived. The accounts provide three contradictory synchronisms with the dynasty of Yngling kings in the Ynglinga saga.

Gautreks saga, in the material about Starkad, relates that after Víkar's sacrificial death, which was Starkad's first crime, Starkad took refuge in Sweden with the kings Alrek and Eirík. In the Ynglinga saga Starkad is mentioned in a single reference to Starkad's third crime, the slaying of Áli the Bold (Áli inn frækni). Áli had usurped the Swedish throne from King Aun the Old, the great-grandson of King Alrek to whom Starkad fled. This is a good chronological match considering Starkad's supposed lifespan of 300 years and that Aun was 60 years old when Áli usurped his throne. This tradition places Vikar and Starkad far back in the mists of time.

But in Hálfs saga, King Hjör who warred against Víkar is father of King Hjörleif, father of Hálf, father of Hjör, father of Geirmund Hellskin (Geirmundr heljarskinn) a contemporary of King Harald Fairhair who settled in Iceland, indicating roughly four generations from Vikar's time to Harald Fairhair's time. In the Ættartolur, Víkar is father of Vatnar, father of Eirík, father of Gyda, wife of Harald Fairhair, indicating three generations from Víkar's time to Harald Fairhair's time. Generations are not exact chronological measurements, so a difference between four generations and three generations does not break the relative chronology. (See Gard Agdi for the Ættartolur traditions about Geirmund's ancestors.)

In both accounts Víkar is king of Hördaland, though Gautreks saga connects Víkar primarily with Agdir. In the Saga of Harald Fairhair and elsewhere, King Eirík, Víkar's grandson in the Ættartolur, rules Hördaland. But other accounts appear to contradict this. The beginning of Grettis saga ('Saga of Grettir') states that Hördaland was ruled by Geirmund Hellskin. The Landnámabók (2.19) instead tells that Geirmund had a dominion in Rogaland but also agrees with the later Hálfs saga that Geirmund was son of Hjör, son of Hálf, son of Hjörleif who was king of the Hjördalanders. Hálfs saga suggests an explanation. This saga first says that Alrek and his son Víkar ruled Hördaland but Hjörleif's ancestors were kings of Rogaland. But after the peace agreement between Víkar and Hjör (and presumably after Víkar's death), Hjörleif son of Hjör is called king of both Hördaland and Rogaland. The situation these account envisages appears to be the reign of two simultaneous lines of kings within Hördaland, perhaps historically true or perhaps arising from artificial conflation of different traditions—traditions perhaps of rulers who reigned over Hördaland at different times, if they ever reigned at all. Such a conflation would encourage the roles played by Geirthjóf and Fridthjóf to be assigned to Jösur and Hjör who in this chronology would become Víkar's contemporaries.

The third chronological placement of Víkar and Starkad is intermediate between these two. The final parts of Gautreks saga make Neri son of Víkar a contemporary of Hrólf Kraki of Denmark. Hrólf Kraki of Denmark is noted for his interactions with King Adils (Aðils) of Sweden who in the Ynglinga saga is sixth in descent from King Alrek of Sweden, the contemporary of Víkar in the Starkad section of Gautreks saga. The Gautreks saga therefore contains two contradictory synchronisms with the Yngling lineage. But about that time of Adils, reckoning by generations, is when the Ynglinga saga places King Gautrek. Some of the details in Hálfs saga also indicate this third synchronism. King Hjör who warred against Víkar is father of King Hjörleif, one of whose wives was the sister of Sölvi (Sǫlvi) the Viking who usurped the Swedish throne from King Eystein (Eysteinn) who was purportedly Adils' son and seventh in descent from King Alrek. The Old English poem Beowulf may agree with this intermediate synchronism. In that poem, the first section occurs during the reign of King Hrothgar of Denmark, the uncle of Hrólf Kraki (called Hrothwulf in the poem). Beowulf foresees that Ingeld's planned wedding to King Hrothgar's daughter will be thwarted by an old warrior who will bring up details of past quarrels and wrongs between the Danes and Heathobards and fighting will result. In the account in book 6 of the Gesta Danorum's, in a parallel story about Ingeldus, the part assigned in prophecy to the unnamed warrior is played by Starkad.

== See also ==
- Petty kingdoms of Norway
- Saga
  - Kings' sagas
  - Legendary saga

Víkar Haraldsson
Regnal titles
Preceded by Herþjóf Hunþjófsson	King of Agder, Hordaland, Jadar, and Hardanger	Succeeded by Harald Víkarsson
Preceded by Fridþjóf Hunþjófsson	King of Telemark	Succeeded by Neri Víkarsson as Jarl of Telemark and the Uplands
Preceded by Geirþjóf Hunþjófsson	King of the Uplands	Succeeded by Neri Víkarsson as Jarl of Telemark and the Uplands

Víkar Alreksson
Regnal titles
Preceded by Alrek Eiríksson	King of Hordaland	Succeeded by Vatnar Víkarsson
