= List of names of Odin =

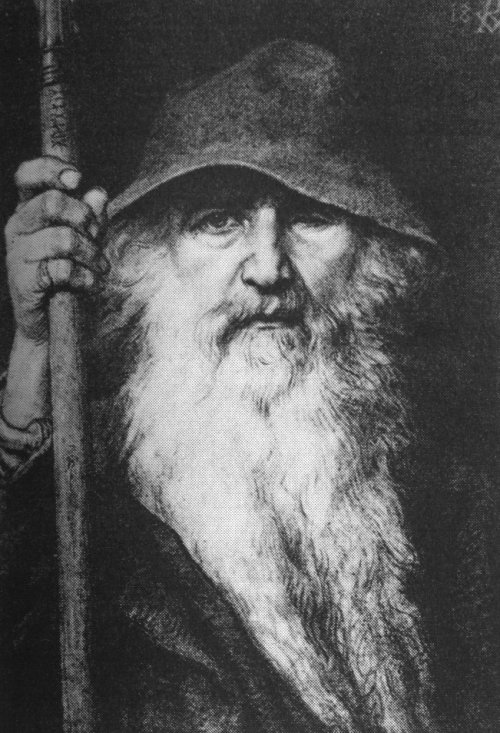
Odin the Wanderer (the meaning of his name Gangleri); illustration by Georg von Rosen, 1886

Odin (Old Norse: Óðinn) is a widely revered god in Norse mythology and Germanic paganism. The god is referred to by numerous names and kenningar, particularly in the Old Norse record.

== List ==
List
Name (Old Norse)	Name (anglicized)	Meaning	Sources
Aldafaðr or Aldafǫðr		Father of mankind	Óðins nǫfn (1), Vafþrúðnismál (4, 53)
Aldagautr		Man-Gautr	Baldrs draumar (2)
Alfǫðr	Alfodr	All-father	Gylfaginning, Skáldskaparmál, Grímnismál (48), Óðins nǫfn (2)
Algingautr		The aged Gautr	The Icelandic rune poem (4)
Angan Friggjar		Delight of Frigg	Vǫluspá (54)
Arnhǫfði		The one with the eagle's head	Óðins nǫfn (2)
Atriðr, Atriði		Attacker	Gylfaginning, Grímnismál (48), Óðins nǫfn (1)
Asagrim (< *Ásagrimmr) (Note: The use of grimmR and the later form grim in the sense "lord" has only a few occurrences from Sweden. In extant Icelandic material, grimmr only appears as an adjective with the meaning "heartless", "strict" and "wicked", which can be compared with the use of adjective gramr ("wrath") as a name for "lord"; see entry for grimmR in the (Nottingham) Runic Dictionary.)		Lord of the Aesir	Stolt Herr Alf
Auðunn (?< *Auðvin)		Wealth-friend (cf. O.E. Ēadwine, Lgb. Audoin)	Óðins nǫfn (1)
Bági ulfs		Enemy of the wolf	Sonatorrek (24)
Baldrs faðir		Baldr's father	Lausavísa from Styrbjarnar þáttr Svíakappa
Báleygr	Baleyg	The one with flaming eyes	Gylfaginning, Skáldskaparmál, Grímnismál (47), Hallfreðr vandræðaskáld's Hákonardrápa (6), Gísl Illugason's Erfikvæði um Magnús berfœtt (1), þulur, Óðins nǫfn (6), Grettisrímur V (61)
Biflindi		The one with the painted shield	Gylfaginning, Grímnismál (49), Óðins nǫfn (6)
Bileygr	Bileyg	The one with poor sight	Gylfaginning, Grímnismál (47), þulur, Óðins nǫfn (5)
Blindi, Blindr		The blind one	Gylfaginning, Helgakviða Hundingsbana II (prose)
Brúni		The one with bushy eyebrows (perh.) / the brown one (less likely; q.v. Brúnn)	Óðins nǫfn (6)
Brúnn		The brown one (prob.) / var. of Brúni (perh.)	Óðins nǫfn (7)
Bǫðgæðir (attested in its genitive form bǫðgœðis)		Battle-promoter	A verse by Hofgarða-Refr Gestsson, Skáldskaparmál
Bǫlverkr		Evil-doer, malefactor	Gylfaginning, Skáldskaparmál, Hávamál (109), Grímnismál (47), Óðins nǫfn (7)
Bors niðr (Bors niðjar)		Bor's son	A verse by Egill Skallagrímsson (Lv 23, V), Egils saga
Bragi		Chieftain, lord	Hǫfuðlausn (31)
Bróðir Vilis, Bróðir Vilja		Vili's brother	Sonatorrek (23)
Burs arfþegi		Bor's heir	Hyndluljóð 30
Byrlindi		Distorted version of: Biflindi	Sturlaugsrímur III (50)
Darraðr, Dorruðr		Spearman	
Draugadróttinn		Lord of the undead / Lord of ghosts	Ynglinga saga (Ch 7)
Dresvarpr		Fervor-/slander- thrower (?)	Óðins nǫfn (2)
Eylúðr		The ever-booming	Óðins nǫfn (6)
Faðmbyggvir Friggjar		Dweller in Frigg's embrace	
Farmagnuðr, Farmǫgnuðr		Journey-empowerer	Háleygjatal (2), Skáldskaparmál
Farmaguð, Farmatýr	Farmagud, Farmatyr	God of burdens	Gylfaginning, Skáldskaparmál, Grímnismál (48), Óðins nǫfn (2)
Farmr galga		Gallows' burden	
Fengr		Catch; catcher; the one who leads the fallen heroes to Valhalla	Óðins nǫfn (2)
Fimbulþulr (Note: Also the name of a river, one of the Élivágar.)	Fimbulthul	Mighty thulr; mighty speaker, mighty wise one	Hávamál (80, 142)
Fimbultýr	Fimbultyr	Mighty god	Vǫluspá (60)
Fjallgeiguðr		Shape-god	Óðins nǫfn (2)
Fjǫlnir (Note: Also the name of a mythological king of Sweden, Fjǫlnir.)	Fjolnir	The one who knows much (perh.)	Grímnismál (47), Reginsmál (18), Gylfaginning (3, 20), many skaldic poems, þulur, Óðins nǫfn (2), Skíðaríma (91, 174)
Fjǫlsviðr	Fjolsvid, Fjolsvin	The very wise one	Gylfaginning, Grímnismál (47), Óðins nǫfn (2)
Fornǫlvir		Heathen ǫlvir	Óðins nǫfn (2)
Fráríðr, Fráríði		The one riding away	Óðins nǫfn (2), Grettisrímur III (1), Sturlaugsrímur VI (47)
Fundinn (Note: According to Rudolf Simek, it is unclear if this refers to Odin. See Simek (2007), p. 96.)		The found one	Óláfsrímur Tryggvasonar A III (1)
Gagnráðr, Gangráðr	Gagnrad, Gangrad	The one who advises against	Vafþrúðnismál (8, 9, 11, 13, 15, 17)
Gangleri (Note: Also an assumed name used by Gylfi.)		The walk-weary one	Gylfaginning, Grímnismál (46), Óðins nǫfn (3)
Gautatýr	Gautatyr	Gautland-god	Skáldskaparmál, Eyvindr skáldaspillir's Hákonarmál (1)
Gautr, Gauti (Note: Also the name of a member of a defunct Scandinavian nation, one of the Geats.)	Gaut	Gotlander	Gylfaginning, Skáldskaparmál, Grímnismál (54), Óðins nǫfn (1), Friðþjófsrímur, Skíðaríma, Landrésrímur, Hjálmþérsrímur, Geiplur, Bjarkarímur, Griplur, Þrændlur, Skáldhelgarímur, Blávusrímur, Geirarðsrímur, Vǫlsungsrímur
Geirlǫðnir		The one who invites to the spear-battle	Óðins nǫfn (3)
Geirǫlnir		Spear-charger	Óðins nǫfn (5)
Geirtýr		Gore-/spear- god	
Geirvaldr		Gore-/spear- master	
Ginnarr		Deceiver	Óðins nǫfn (1)
Gizurr (Note: Also the name of a Geatish king, Gizurr.)		Riddler	Óðins nǫfn (1)
Gestumblindi		Blind guest	Hervarar saga (10), þulur, Óðins nǫfn (7)
Glapsviðr	Glapsvid, Glapsvin	Swift in deceit, swift tricker, maddener, wise in magical spells	Gylfaginning, Grímnismál (47), Óðins nǫfn (3)
Godan/Goden		(Lombard var. of Odin)	Foulke (2003 [1974]:315–17)
Goði hrafnblóts		Goði of the raven-offering	
Goðjaðarr		God-protector	Sonatorrek (23)
Gǫllnir		Yeller	Óðins nǫfn (3)
Gollorr		Yeller	Óðins nǫfn (1)
Gǫllungr		Yeller	Óðins nǫfn (5)
Gǫndlir (Note: "Geldnir" in some manuscripts.)	Gondlir	Wand-Bearer, Wand-Wielder	Gylfaginning, Grímnismál (49), Óðins nǫfn (3)
Gramr Hliðskjálfar		King of Hliðskjálf	
Grímnir	Grimnir	Hooded, masked one	Gylfaginning, Grímnismál (introduction, 47, 49), Hallfreðr vandræðaskáld's lausavísur (9), Eilífr Goðrúnarson's Þórsdrápa (3), Húsdrápa (1), Rǫgnvaldr kali Kolsson's lausavísur (7), þulur, Óðins nǫfn (1)
Grímr	Grim	Mask	Gylfaginning, Grímnismál (46, 47), þulur, Óðins nǫfn (3, 7)
Gunnblindi		Battle-blinder	Óðins nǫfn (8)
Hagvirkr		Skillful worker	Óðins nǫfn (4)
Hangadróttinn		Lord of the hanged	Ynglinga saga (Ch 7)
Hangaguð, Hangatýr	Hangagud, Hangatyr	God of the hanged	Gylfaginning, Skáldskaparmál
Hangi		Hanged one	
Haptabeiðir		Commander of leaders	
Haptaguð	Haptagud	God of prisoners	Gylfaginning
Haptasnytrir		Teacher of gods	
Haptsǫnirî		Fetter-loosener	
Hárbarðr	Harbard	Hoary-beard, grey-beard	Gylfaginning, Grímnismál (49), Hárbardsljód, þulur, Óðins nǫfn (3)
Hárr	Har	High	Gylfaginning, Grímnismál (46), Óðins nǫfn (2)
Harri Hliðskjálfar		Lord of Hliðskjálf	
Hávi	Havi	High one	Hávamál (109, 111, 164), Óðins nǫfn (4)
Heimþinguðr hanga		Visitor of the hanged	
Helblindi (Note: Also the name of a brother of Loki.)		Hel-blinder	Gylfaginning, Grímnismál (46)
Hengikeptr, Hengikjopt		Hang-jaw	Óðins nǫfn (4)
Herblindi		Host-blinder	Óðins nǫfn (5)
Herfǫðr, Herjafǫðr	Herfodr, Herjafodr	Father of hosts	Gylfaginning, Vǫluspá (29, 43), Vafthrúdnismál (2), Grímnismál (19, 25, 26), Óðins nǫfn (5)
Hergautr		Host-Gautr	
Herjan		Warrior, harrier, lord, leader of hosts	Gylfaginning, Grímnismál (46), Óðins nǫfn (2), Vǫluspá (31)
Herteitr	Herteit	Glad of war	Gylfaginning, Grímnismál (47), Óðins nǫfn (3)
Hertýr	Hertyr	Host-Týr or god of hosts	Skáldskaparmál
Hildolfr		Battle-wolf	
Hjaldrgegnir		Engager of battle	
Hjaldrgoð		God of battle	
Hjálmberi	Hjalmberi	Helmet-bearer	Gylfaginning, Grímnismál (46), þulur, Óðins nǫfn (2)
Hjarrandi		Screamer	Óðins nǫfn (4)
Hléfreyr		Famous-/barrow- lord	Óðins nǫfn (5)
Hleifruðr		Wayfinder	Óðins nǫfn (4)
Hnikarr	Hnikar	Overthrower, thruster	Gylfaginning, Grímnismál (47), Reginsmál (18, 19), Óðins nǫfn (2)
Hnikuðr	Hnikud	Overthrower	Gylfaginning, Grímnismál (48), Óðins nǫfn (1)
Hoárr		One-eyed	
Hǫtter		Hatter, hat-wearer	
Hovi		High one	
Hrafnaguð, Hrafnáss	Hrafnagud	Raven god	Gylfaginning (38)
Hrafnfreistuðr		Raven-tester	
Hrami		Fetterer, ripper	Óðins nǫfn (4)
Hrani		Blusterer	Latin inscription, Hrólfs saga kraka
Hrjóðr		Roarer	Óðins nǫfn (4)
Hroptr, Hroptatýr	Hropt, Hroptatyr	Sage (Note: The meaning is disputed; Lindow (2001:185) notes Magnus Olsen's argument that "Hroptr" is associated with Odin's seductions, since in Saxo Grammaticus' Gesta Danorum, he takes the name Rofterus when seducing Rind; Larrington (1996:12) translates Hroptr as "sage" in Vǫluspá.)	Gylfaginning, Skáldskaparmál, Hákonarmál (14), Úlfr Uggason's Húsdrápa (8), Hávamál (160), Grímnismál (54), Sigrdrífumál (13), Óðins nǫfn (2, 3, 5), Vǫluspá (62)
Hrosshársgrani		Horse-hair moustache	Gautreks saga, Óðins nǫfn (4)
Hvatmóðr		Courage of the whet-stone	Óðins nǫfn (5)
Hveðrungr		Roarer or weather-maker	Óðins nǫfn (5)
Ítrekr		Glorious ruler	Hervarar saga ok Heiðreks< (Note: Inferred to be a name of Odin from Ítreksjóð, 'offspring of Ítrekr', in a list of Odin's sons in the Eddaic þulur. See (Burrows, 2014).)
Jafnhárr	Jafnhar	Evenhigh, just-as-high, equally high	Gylfaginning, Grímnismál (49), Óðins nǫfn (8)
Jalfaðr		Yellow-brown back	
Jálg, Jálkr	Jalk	Horse, gelding	Gylfaginning, Grímnismál (49, 54), Óðins nǫfn (7)
Járngrímr		Iron-mask	
Jólnir, Jǫlnir		Yule figure	Óðins nǫfn (7)
Jolfr		Horse-wolf, bear	
Jǫlfuðr, Jǫlfǫðr		Yule father	Óðins nǫfn (8)
Jǫrmunr		The mighty one, cosmic	Óðins nǫfn (8)
Kjalarr	Kjalar	Keel, nourisher	Gylfaginning, Skáldskaparmál, Grímnismál (49), Óðins nǫfn (1)
Langbarðr	Langbard	Long-beard	þulur, Óðins nǫfn (7)
Lǫndungr, Loðungr		Shaggy-cloak–wearer	Óðins nǫfn (7)
Niðr Bors		Bor's kin	
Njótr		User, enjoyer; or needed one	Óðins nǫfn (6)
Óðinn	Odin, Othin	Frenzy, rage, inspiration	
Ófnir		Inciter	Óðins nǫfn (7)
Olgr		Protector, hawk	Óðins nǫfn (6)
Ómi	Omi	Resounding one	Gylfaginning, Grímnismál (49), Óðins nǫfn (7)
Óski	Oski	God of wishes, wished-for	Gylfaginning, Grímnismál (49), Óðins nǫfn (8)
Rauðgrani		Red mustache	Bárðar saga Snæfellsáss 18, Ǫrvar-Odds saga 19ff.
Reiðartýr		Wagon-god or god of riders	
Rǫgnir		Chief, he who reigns	Óðins nǫfn (5)
Rúnatýr		God of runes	
Runni vagna		Mover of constellations	
Saðr	Sadr, Sann	Truthful, sooth	Gylfaginning, Grímnismál (47), Óðins nǫfn (8)
Sanngetall		Finder of truth	Gylfaginning, Grímnismál (47), Óðins nǫfn (7)
Sfidrer		Burning	Sveriges historia i sammandrag(54)
Síðgrani	Sidgrani	Long-beard	Alvíssmál (6)
Síðhǫttr (Note: "Sidhofr" in other manuscripts.)	Sidhott	Broad-hat	Gylfaginning, Grímnismál (48), þulur, Óðins nǫfn (4)
Síðskeggr	Sidskegg	Long-beard	Gylfaginning, Grímnismál (48), þulur, Óðins nǫfn (6)
Sigðir		Victory-granter / victory-bringer	Óðins nǫfn (6)
Sigfǫðr	Sigfodr	Father of victory, war-father	Gylfaginning, Vǫluspá (54), Grímnismál (48), Óðins nǫfn (4)
Siggautr		Victory-Gautr	Óðins nǫfn (6)
Sigrhǫfundr		Victory-author	Sonatorrek (22)
Sigmundr		Victory-protection	Óðins nǫfn (6)
Sigrúnnr		Victory-tree	
Sigtryggr		Sure of victory, victory-true	Óðins nǫfn (8)
Sigtýr (Note: The plural sigtívar refers to the gods in many Eddic poems.)	Sigtyr	God of victory, war-god	Skáldskaparmál, Atlakviða (30), Glúmr Geirason's Gráfeldardrápa (12)
Sigþrór		Successful in victory, thriving in victory	Óðins nǫfn (8)
Skilfingr	Skilfing	Trembler or he of Hliðskjálf	Gylfaginning, Grímnismál (54), Óðins nǫfn (8)
Skollvaldr		Ruler of treachery	Óðins nǫfn (6)
Sonr Bestlu		Son of Bestla	
Spjalli Gauta		Friend of the Goths	Sonatorrek (21)
Sváfnir (Note: Also the name of a serpent found in the wellspring of Hvergelmir.)	Svafnir	Sleep-bringer, closer	Gylfaginning, Grímnismál (54), Óðins nǫfn (4) (Note: The root svaf- is an Indo-European cognate to words meaning sleep (Greek hypnos; Latin sopor, sopio, somnus; etc.))
Sveigðir		Reed-bringer (Note: See: the story of Vikarr.)	
Sviðarr	Svidar		Gylfaginning
Sviðrir	Svidrir	Calmer	Gylfaginning, Grímnismál (50), Óðins nǫfn (6)
Sviðuðr			Óðins nǫfn (4)
Sviðurr	Svidur	Wise one	Gylfaginning, Skáldskaparmál, Grímnismál (50), Óðins nǫfn (6)
Svipall		Changing, fleeting; or shape-shifter	Gylfaginning, Grímnismál (47), Óðins nǫfn (3)
Svǫlnir	Svolnir	Cooler	Skáldskaparmál, Óðins nǫfn (6)
Tveggi		Double, twofold	Óðins nǫfn (8) Vǫluspá (63)
Tvíblindi	Tviblindi	Twice-blind	þulur, Óðins nǫfn (4)
Þekkr	Thekk	Known, welcome one	Gylfaginning, Grímnismál (46), Óðins nǫfn (7)
Þrasarr		Quarreler	Óðins nǫfn (4)
Þriði	Thridi	Third	Gylfaginning, Skáldskaparmál, Grímnismál (46), Óðins nǫfn (5)
Þriggi		Triple	
Þrór	Thror	Burgeoning, thriving	Gylfaginning, Grímnismál (49), Óðins nǫfn (8)
Þróttr	Thrott	Strength	Glymdrápa (2)
Þuðr	Thud, Thunn	Lean, pale	Gylfaginning, Óðins nǫfn (7)
Þundr	Thund	Thunderer	Gylfaginning, Hávamál (145), Grímnismál (46, 54), Óðins nǫfn (7)
Uðr	Ud, Unn (Note: Also the name of one of the nine daughters of Ægir.)	Loved, beloved, striver	Gylfaginning, Grímnismál (46), Óðins nǫfn (7)
Váfuðr	Vafud	Wanderer	Gylfaginning, Skáldskaparmál, Grímnismál (54)
Váfuðr Gungnis		Swinger of Gungnir	
Váði vitnis		Foe of the wolf	
Vakr	Vak	Wakeful, awakener	Gylfaginning, Grímnismál (54), Óðins nǫfn (7)
Valdr galga		Ruler of gallows	Þórðar saga hreðu (Lausavísur 9)
Valdr vagnbrautar		Ruler of Heaven	
Valfǫðr	Valfodr	Father of the slain	Gylfaginning, Vǫluspá (1, 27, 28), Grímnismál (48), þulur, Óðins nǫfn (5)
Valgautr	Valgaut	Slaughter-Gautr, Geat of the slain	Skáldskaparmál, Óðins nǫfn (8)
Valkjosandi		Chooser of the slain	
Valtamr, Valtam		Slain-tame, the warrior	
Valtýr		God of the slain	Gylfaginning, Skáldskaparmál
Valþognir		Receiver of the slain	
Vegtam		Wanderer or way-tame	Baldrs draumar (6, 13)
Veratýr	Veratyr	God of men, god of being	Gylfaginning, Óðins nǫfn (8)
Viðfräger		Wide-famed	
Viðrir	Vidrir	Stormer	Gylfaginning, Skáldskaparmál, Lokasenna (26) Hrafnagaldr Óðins (9)
Viðrímnir, Viðhrimnir		Contrary screamer or wide hoary-beard	Óðins nǫfn (1)
Viðurr	Vidur	Killer	Gylfaginning, Grímnismál (49), Óðins nǫfn (6), Karlevi Runestone
Vingnir		Swinger	Óðins nǫfn (5)
Vinr Lopts		Friend of Loptr	
Vinr Lóðurs		Friend of Lóðurr	
Vinr Míms		Friend of Mímir	Sonatorrek (23)
Vinr stalla		Friend of altars	
Vófuðr		Dangler	Óðins nǫfn (5)
Vǫlundr rómu		Smith of battle	
Yggr	Ygg	Terrible one	Gylfaginning, Skáldskaparmál, Vǫluspá (28), Grímnismál (53, 54), Óðins nǫfn (8)
Ýjungr, Ýrungr		Stormy or of the primal streams	Óðins nǫfn (8)

In Old English, Odin was known as Wōden; in Old Saxon, as Wōdan; and in Old High German, as Wuotan or Wōtan.

== See also ==
- List of names of Thor
- List of names of Freyr
- List of kennings
- Mercurius Cimbrianus – Mercury god of Germanic tribe of Cimbri
- Names of God in Old English poetry
- Godan and Wodan

== Sources ==
- Foulke, William Dudley (Trans.) (2003) [1974]. Edward Peters (ed.). History of the Lombards. University of Pennsylvania Press. ISBN 978-0812210798.
- Larrington, Carolyne (Trans.) (1996). The Poetic Edda. Oxford World's Classics. Oxford; New York: Oxford University Press. ISBN 0192839462.
- Lindow, John (2001). Norse Mythology: A Guide to the Gods, Heroes, Rituals, and Beliefs. Oxford; New York: Oxford University Press. ISBN 0195153820.
- Simek, Rudolf (2007) [1993]. Dictionary of Northern Mythology. Translated by Angela Hall. Cambridge: D. S. Brewer. ISBN 0859913694.
