= Gaute =

- Gender: Male

Origin
- Origin: Norwegian
- Region of origin: Norway

Other names
- Related names: Gauti, Gautr, Gaut, Goude, Goute, Göte, Göthe, Gautur

Gaute is a Norwegian masculine given name derived from the Old Norse Gauti, which is formed by the word gautr, i.e. "man from Götaland (Gautaland) in Sweden" or, even earlier, "Goths". In 2016, 1997 people used the name in Norway and is currently ranked #240. In Sweden the versions Göte or Göthe, in Iceland Gauti or Gautur and in Finland Göte is used as the given name equivalent.

== Usage and appearance ==
Gauti and Gautr is famously used in fifteen different runic inscriptions from the Viking Age, so the names were well known, but probably not among the most widely used at the time. Gaute was first used as epithets, but became common first names for the year 1300, also in forms Gaut and Gautr. Over 40 different people with the name mentioned in Regesta Norvegica. The name was rarely used between 1700 and around 1930. In the 1940s, the name was adopted partly in Rogaland and got a small boost after 1970, but was still not among the most commonly used names. Today, the name has increased its use. Some place names also derives from the given name Gaute as a part of a longer geographical name.

Gaute can also be used as the first or last part of other names. This was particularly common in the Middle Ages, like names as Arngaut, Asgaut, Audgaut, Algot, Gautrek, Hergaut and Torgauten. The name was in compositions often borrowed from Swedish. The variants Valgaut, Siggaut, Gautatýr and Gaut was occasionally used as the name of the god Odin.

== Notable people ==
- Gaute Barlindhaug (born 1975), Norwegian electronic musician
- Gaute Bie (born 1979), Norwegian author
- Gaute T. Einevoll (born 1962), Norwegian Professor of Physics
- Gaute Godager (born 1970), Norwegian game developer
- Gaute Grøtta Grav (born 1979), Norwegian television host
- Gaute Melby Gundersen (born 1972), Norwegian athlete
- Gaute Haugenes, Norwegian football manager
- Gaute Heivoll (born 1978), Norwegian poet, novelist and playwright
- Gaute Helstrup (born 1976), Norwegian footballer and manager
- Svein Gaute Hølestøl (born 1971), Norwegian professional cyclist
- Gaute Ivarsson (1475–1510), Norwegian Archbishop of Nidaros
- Gaute Kivistik (born 1971), Estonian humorist and journalist
- Gaute Larsen (born 1961), Norwegian football coach
- Gaute Myklebust (born 1979), Norwegian discus thrower
- Gaute Ormåsen (born 1983), Norwegian singer
- Gaute Boris Skjegstad (born 1983), Norwegian actor
- Gaute Storaas (born 1959), Norwegian jazz musician
- Gaute Vikdal (born 1956), Norwegian musician

== See also ==
- Gaut
