= Geirmund =

Geirmund is a given name. Notable people with the given name include:

- Geirmund Hjørson Heljarskinn (9th century), Icelander
- Geirmund Brendesæter (born 1970), Norwegian footballer
- Geirmund Ihle (1934–2016), Norwegian politician
- Geirmund Simonsen, musician
- Geirmund the Noisy (died 978), Viking adventurer of the 10th century
