= Starkad =

Eight-armed giant and legendary hero in Norse mythology

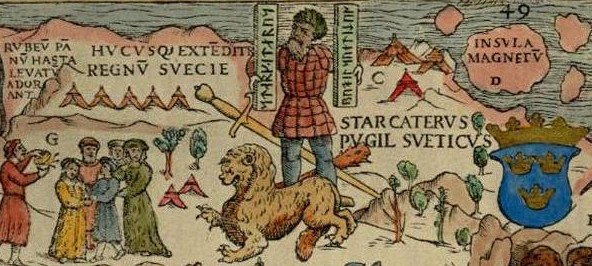
Starkad as illustrated on Carta Marina (1539) by Olaus Magnus.

Starkad (Old Norse: Starkaðr [ˈstɑrkɑðz̠] or Stǫrkuðr [ˈstɔrkoðz̠]; Latin: Starcaterus; in the Late Middle Ages also Starkodder; modern Danish: Stærkodder) was either an eight-armed giant or the human grandson of the aforementioned giant in Norse mythology.

Starkad appears in numerous accounts, and the stories of his adventures relate to different Scandinavian traditions. He is most fully treated in Gesta Danorum but he also appears in Icelandic sources. He is portrayed as a great warrior who performed many heroic deeds but also many crimes.

A cognate of the Starkad legends can be found in the Anglo-Saxon poem Beowulf.

== Beowulf ==
In Beowulf, the feud between the Danes and the Heaðobards was to be ended with the marriage of Ingeld, the son of the fallen Heaðobard king Froda, and Freawaru, the daughter of the Danish king Hroðgar. During the wedding an unnamed old warrior reminded the Heaðobards of their defeat and encouraged them to revenge. That is the origin of Starkad's admonishing speech to the Danish king Ingellus, son of Frotho (see the account given in Gesta Danorum below). Sophus Bugge derived the name Starkaðr from originally meaning "the strong Heaðobard". The first element is the Norse stark-.

== Hervarar saga ==
A version of the legend of Starkad can be found in the prologue of the U-version of Hervarar saga, and in a shortened form in the H-version of the Hauksbók.

In this version a Starkad Ala-Warrior lived in northern Norway at the waterfalls of Alufoss. He descended from the giants known as the þursar (jotuns), and his father's name was Storkvid. Starkad was very much a jotun himself and had eight arms, but he was betrothed to a girl named Ogn Elf-burst. One day, when Starkad had gone north across the Élivágar, another giant named Hergrim kidnapped Ogn. Starkad challenged Hergrim to a holmgang, a duel. Starkad used four swords at the same time and slew Hergrim. Ogn did not wish to be Starkad's wife and committed suicide by stabbing herself with a sword. Starkad contented himself by taking everything Hergrim owned, including his son Grimr.

Álfhildr was the daughter of king Álfr of Álfheim (modern Bohuslän) and like the people of Álfheim, she was very beautiful. One autumn, king Álfr performed the Dísablót, a sacrifice to the goddesses, and Álfhildr took part in it. As she was reddening the horgr (altar) with blood, Starkad kidnapped her. King Álfr called on the god Thor to help him rescue his daughter. Thor granted his wish by killing Starkad and rescuing the girl.

== Gautreks saga ==
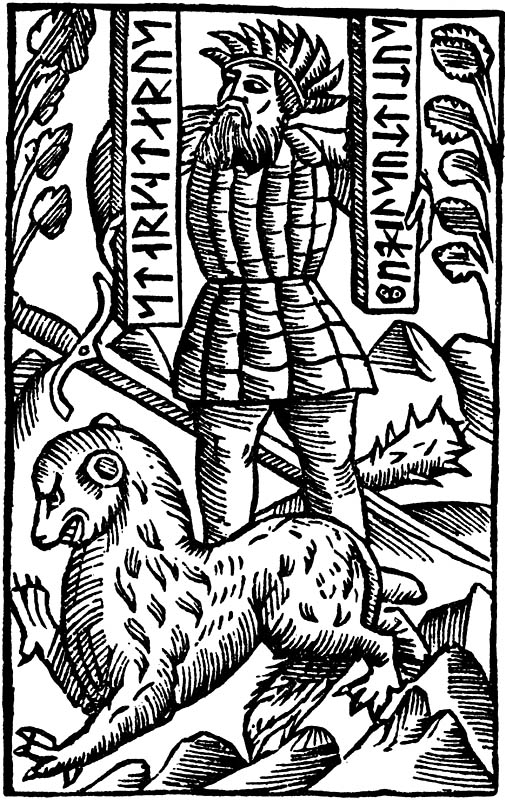
The hero Starkad, from Olaus Magnus' Historia de gentibus septentrionalibus (1555).

Gautreks saga continues the account found in Hervarar saga. It tells among other things the adventures of Starkad, the son of Stórvirkr who was the son of Starkad Ala-warrior, whom Thor had killed.

It tells that young Starkad was raised at the court of Harald, the king of Agder, together with Harald's son Vikar. One day, Herþjófr, the king of Hordaland, made a raid and killed king Harald. He also took Vikar hostage to ensure the loyalty of the people of Agder. When Vikar had grown up, he assembled a warband, including Starkad and avenged his father by killing Herþjófr with thirty of his warriors. Vikar was then king of Agder, Hordaland, and Hardanger.

Starkad took part in Víkar's many battles for the hegemony of the petty kingdoms of southern Norway, one of the battles where Battle at Lake Vænir and he was Víkar's greatest warrior.

After all these victories, when sailing north from Agdir to Hördaland with a large army, Víkar was becalmed. Divination showed Odin required a sacrifice of one person chosen by lot and Víkar's lot came up each time. The decision was put off till the next day. Then Grani Horsehair, Starkad's foster father, took Starkad to a secret council of the gods and revealed himself to be Odin. Odin bestowed on Starkad the blessings of living three lifetimes, of possessing the most excellent of weapons, an abundance of riches, victory in battle, the gift of poetry and always to be held in the highest esteem among the rich and powerful. Thor, however, who hated Starkad because of his jotun origin, denied Starkad the blessing of having children and cursed him to commit a crime every lifetime he lived and never to possess real estate. Thor further cursed Starkad never to feel that he had enough property, always to receive dangerous wounds in battle, never to remember his skaldic poems and ever to be hated by commoners. After blessings and curses laid on Starkad alternately by Odin and Thor, Odin asked Starkad to send him King Víkar in payment for Odin's blessings. Starkad agreed and Odin gave Starkad a spear which Odin promised would appear to be only a reed-stalk. So Vikar met his death.

After Vikar's death, Starkad fled to Sweden and the kings Alrek and Eirík at Uppsala. Starkad served them first as a companion on their viking expeditions and then, after Alrek and Eirík had settled down, he went on further Viking expeditions alone.

== Skaldic poetry ==
Starkad is said to have composed poems himself which appear in Gautrek's saga. Thor's hate of Starkad because of his jotun origins is mentioned in Skáldskaparmál, where there is a lausavísa by Vetrliði Sumarliðason praising Thor for having killed giants and giantesses, and for having defeated Starkad:

Leggi brauzt þú Leiknar, lamðir Þrívalda, steypðir Starkeði, stéttu of Gjalp dauða.	Thou didst break the leg of Leikn, Didst bruise Thrívaldi, Didst cause to stoop Starkadr, Didst stand on lifeless Gjálp.	You broke Leikn's bones, you pounded Thrivaldi you cast down Starkad, you stood over the dead Gialp.

However, it could also be a reference to Starkad's grandfather, Starkad Ala-Warrior, whom Thor killed for having kidnapped Álfhildr, the princess of Alfheim.

== Ynglinga saga ==
In the Ynglinga saga, Snorri Sturluson tells what happened a few generations after the deaths of Alrek and Eirík.

The Swedish king Aun was not a warlike king and had been chased away from his kingdom by Halfdan. When Halfdan had died, Aun returned to Uppsala to rule his old kingdom. After having sacrificed one of his sons to Odin, the god let him live for another sixty years. However, when twenty-five years had passed, a Danish prince named Áli the Bold appeared and chased Aun to exile in Götaland. Áli ruled for twenty-five years until Starkad appeared and killed him. Then Aun could return to his kingdom and ruled it for another period of twenty-five years.

== Sögubrot ==
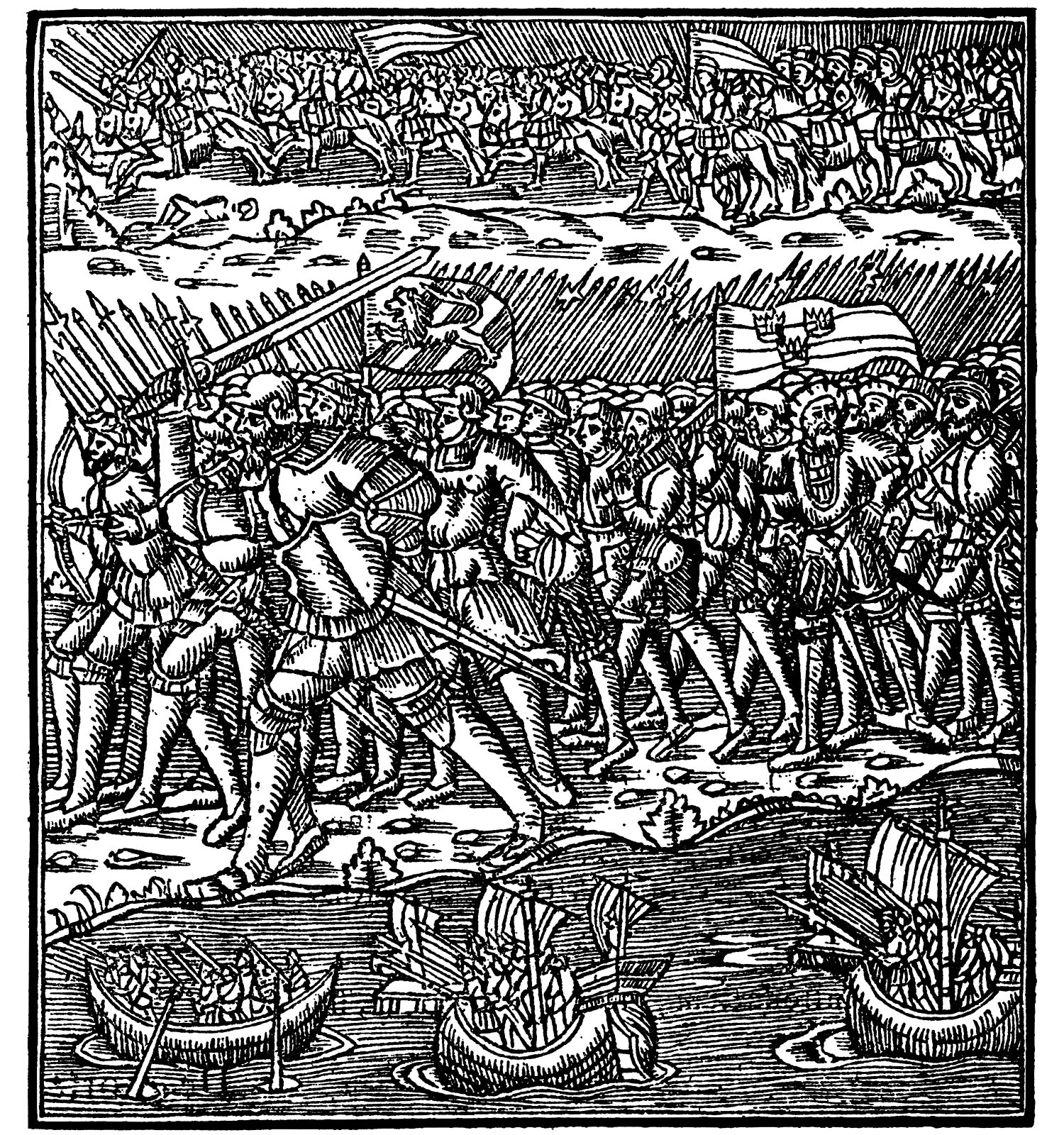
Starkad leads Geats (the banner with a lion) and Swedes (the banner with three crowns) in battle against the Danes, from Olaus Magnus' Historia de gentibus septentrionalibus (1555).

The Sögubrot deals with events taking place in the 8th century, a long time after Starkad killed Áli the Bold.

When the Swedish king Sigurd Hring prepared for the Battle of the Brávellir against the Danish Harald Wartooth, a much later king Áli the Bold appeared with seven other kings to help him in the battle. These kings were accompanied by a great many champions, and among them Starkad the Old, the son of Stórverkr. Starkad would later compose a poem about this battle that would serve as a source for the sagas.

When the battle had begun, a formidable champion named Ubbi of Friesland charged against Ragnvald the Good Councilor the foremost champion in the wedge formation of king Sigurd. After a fierce fight, Ragnvald died and Ubbi pushed on killing champion after champion.

When king Sigurd Hring saw this he encouraged his warriors and said that it was not possible that no one could defeat Ubbi. He then asked "where is Starkad?". The old warrior answered "it is difficult to win sire. However, I will do my best and do what I can, but Ubbi is a tough fighter". Starkad engaged with Ubbi and a fight began that was long and the most fierce of the entire battle. Eventually, Starkad gave Ubbi a single wound, but Starkad had received six big ones, and thought that no one had been closer to kill him before. The two champions were separated by the pushing throng of warriors, and Ubbi finally fell riddled with arrows from the archers of Telemark.

The shieldmaiden Vebiorg took on the Swedish army. First she killed the champion Söti, but then Starkad attacked her. After giving Vebiorg a number of slashes, she cut his mouth so that his chin fell. Starkad had to bite his beard to keep his chin in place. She was killed by Thorkil the Bold.

Biting his beard and ignoring his wounds, Starkad charged the Danish army, killing man after man, until he met the shieldmaiden Ursina who carried the banner of king Harald Wartooth. She told him that he had met his last opponent, but he cut off the hand that held the banner and killed her. Starkad continued killing warrior after warrior, until he finally was so severely wounded that he had a large gash on his neck and a large gash on his chest that made his two lungs hang out. On his right hand, he had lost a finger.

The battle ended with Swedish victory.

== Norna-Gests þáttr ==
In Norna-Gests þáttr, the account of Starkad takes place not long after the victory at the Battle of the Brávellir. The account deals with a meeting between Starkad and the hero Sigurd Dragonslayer. The old Norna-Gest told that during the time when he was with Sigurd Dragonslayer, the Swedish king Sigurd Hring demanded tribute from Sigurd and his people. When Sigurd refused, the king of Sweden sent an army to subdue him, led by the sons of Gandalf.

In the Swedish army, there was a man who was even bigger and stronger than the sons of Gandalf. The giant man killed both men and horses and nothing could defeat him. Sigurd and Gest approached the huge warrior and asked who he was. He answered that he was Starkad the son of Stórvirkr.

When Starkad learnt that Sigurd was the same Sigurd who had killed the dragon Fafnir, he tried to escape. However, Sigurd went after him and dealt a blow with his sword Gramr that ripped two teeth off Starkad's mouth. Sigurd then asked Starkad to go home. When Starkad had left the battle, the sons of Gandalf retired as well, and so Sigurd had won the battle against the Swedes.

== Gesta Danorum ==
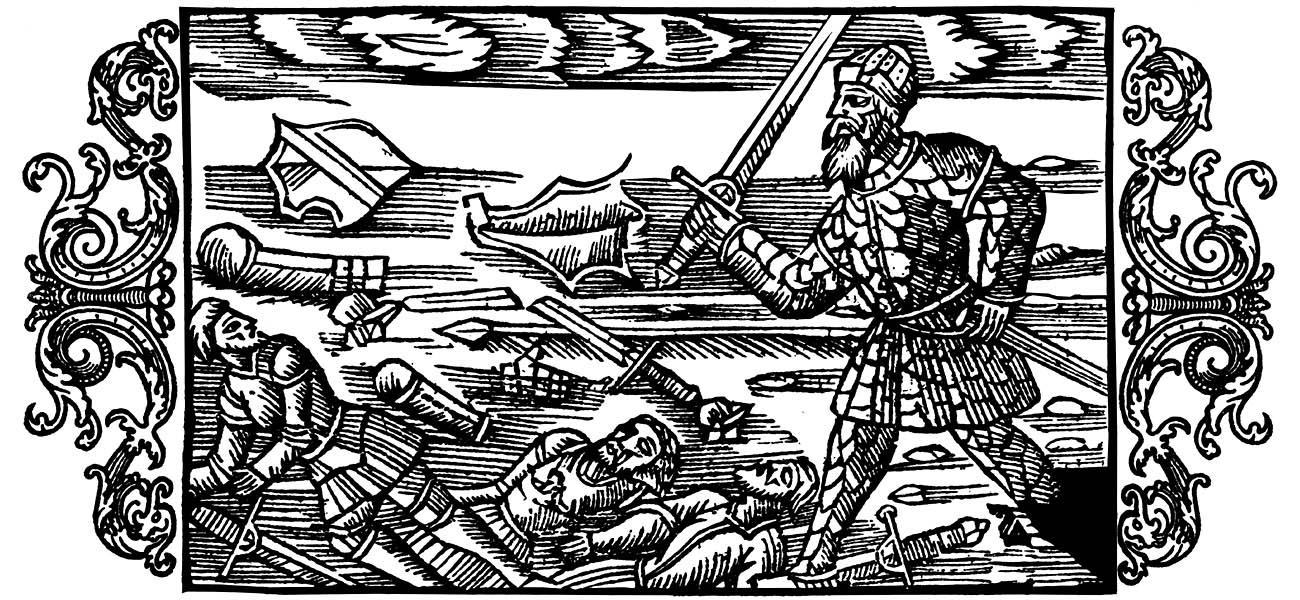
Starkad in battle, from Olaus Magnus' Historia de gentibus septentrionalibus (1555).

It is in Gesta Danorum that the most comprehensive treatment of Starkad is found. The Danish chronicler Saxo Grammaticus wrote that Starkad was the son of Stórvirkr (Storwerk/Storuerkus) and saved himself from a shipwreck. He entered the service of the Danish king Frotho and was given a ship so that he could patrol the shores.

No man was Starkad's equal as he was endowed with a superhuman size and a noble disposition. Saxo Grammaticus gives two accounts of Starkad's origin. According to one, he was born in the land of Estonians east of the Baltic Sea. According to the second, which the chronicler considers fantastic and unlikely, Starkad was born of jotuns, and he had formerly many arms until Thor cut off all arms but two. Odin had bestowed on Starkad the curse and the blessing that he would live the lives of three men, and commit three evil deeds.

His first evil deed was the murder of the Norwegian petty king Vikar (Wicarus). Starkad had joined a Viking expedition with Vikar, but they found themselves stopped by a strong wind. They then had the idea that they could appease the gods by performing a blót with human blood, and decided to cast lots as to whom was to be sacrificed. Starkad made a noose of willow and put it around the king's neck in the pretense that it was only for show and not for killing. However, the knot was so strong that the king was dying, and Starkad gave him the coup de grace with his sword. Others say that the noose of willow suddenly became so strong that the king was strangled.

Starkad joined the Danish Viking Bemon (Bemonus) and they had a tough discipline on their crew, forbidding them alcoholic beverages. During an attack in Russia, they discovered that the Russians had riddled the terrain with caltrops to stop the Vikings. However, Starkad and his men donned clogs and so won the battle. When Bemon was dead, Starkad entered the service of the Bjarmians and did many heroic deeds among them.

Later, Starkad stayed for seven years in Sweden at Uppsala, with the sons of Frey. However the effeminate jingle of bells, the dancing and the mimes at the sacrifices (see the Temple at Uppsala) nauseated Starkad.

He then enlisted with the Danish king Haki (Haco), and fought for him during the attack on king Hugleik (Hugletus) of Ireland. Hugleik wasted his riches on actors and jugglers, but was defended by Svipdag (Suibdagus) and Geigad (Gegathus), who gave Starkad the most vicious wound he had ever received. After winning the battle, Starkad had all the mimes and jugglers flogged, and all the riches looted.

Starkad was then sent with the Slavic prince Win (Winus) to quell a rebellion in the East. He fought against Curonians, Sambians, Semigallians, until all the Easterlings had been defeated. By covering his sword with a hide, he also defeated a warlord named Wisin (Wisinnus), who lived at Anafial in Russia, and who could make a weapon blunt only by looking at it. He continued his victories by killing the jotun Tanna in Byzantium and the Polish champion Wasce/Wilzce. (It is theorized that Polish writer Theodor Narbutt picked the name of the mountain and the villain (Anafial and Wisinnus) to embellish a legend about mount Anafielas, allegedly a place of the afterlife in Lithuanian pagan mythology).

When the Saxons rebelled against Frotho, and challenged him to a duel against Hama, Starkad unexpectedly returned and took Frotho's place in the duel. Hama contemptuously brought Starkad to his knees with a blow by his fist, but Starkad rose up and cut Hama to death.

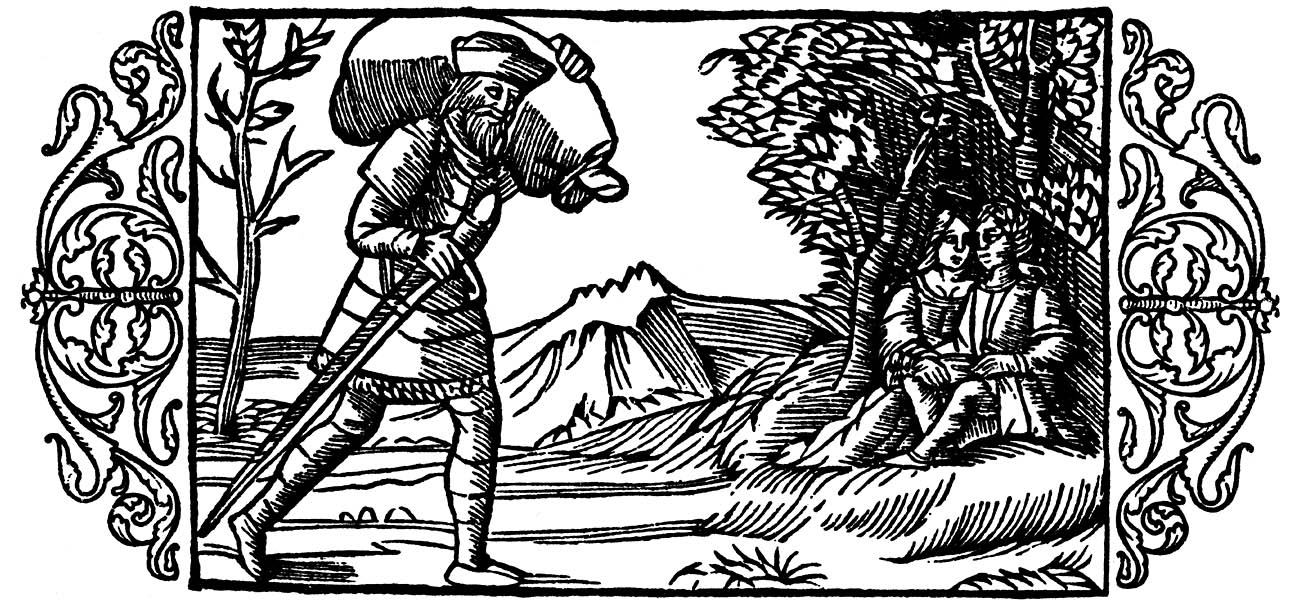
Starkad meets Ingellus with a mistress, from Olaus Magnus' Historia de gentibus septentrionalibus (1555).

After a while Frotho was killed through treachery by a Saxon named Swerting (Swertingus). Frotho's son Ingild (Ingellus) lived a wanton life and married one of Swerting's daughters. This angered Starkad so much that he enlisted at the Swedish king Halfdan's (Haldanus) court instead. However, when he learnt that Helga, Ingild's sister, was about to marry a lowly goldsmith, Starkad appeared in disguise and castrated the goldsmith. He gave Helga a slap on her face and lambasted her. Then he returned to Sweden and king Halfdan.

Ingild gave Helga to a Norwegian named Helgi (Helgo), on the condition that he fight nine brothers from Zealand who courted her, and among whom the eldest was named Angantyr (Angaterus). Helgi went to Sweden's most famous city Uppsala and asked Starkad to help him in the fight. Starkad agreed, but left Helgi with his bride in order to fight with the nine brothers himself at the moor of Roliung.

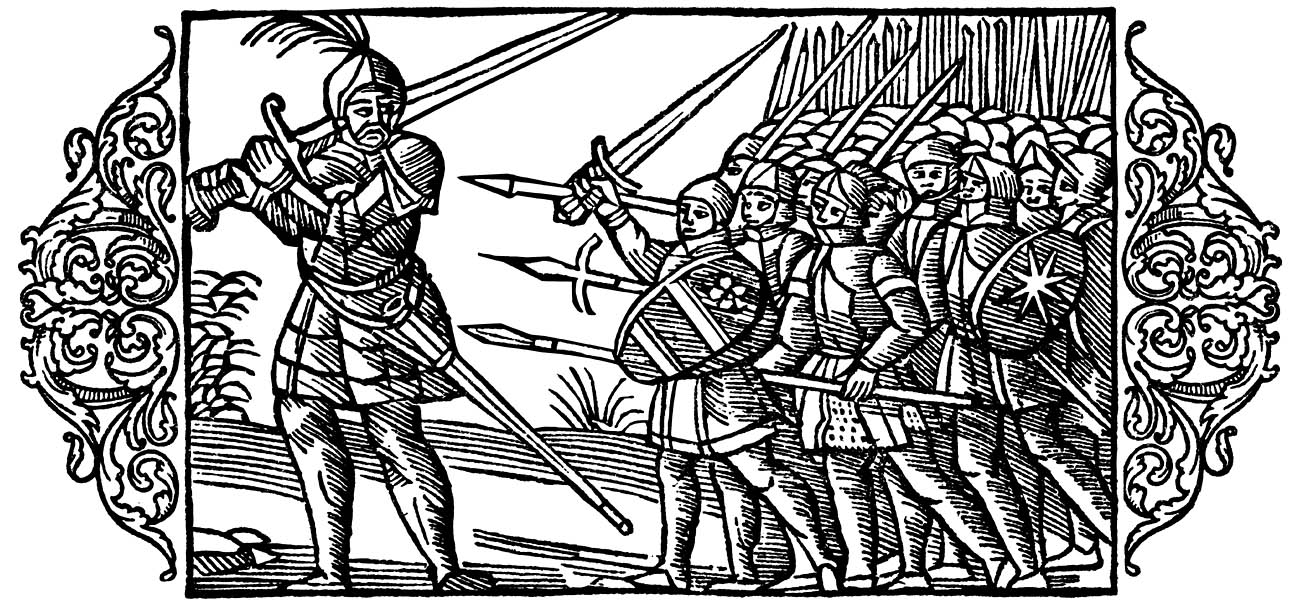
Starkad leads those oppressed by the nine brothers, from Olaus Magnus' Historia de gentibus septentrionalibus (1555).

Starkad killed the nine brothers but had received seventeen wounds himself, and was so seriously wounded that his guts hung out. He refused the care of three lowly passers-by, but accepted the treatment of a peasant's son, and could return to Sweden.

As Ingild continued his sinful life and did not do his duty to avenge his father, Starkad appeared during a banquet that Ingild had with the sons of Swerting, his father's slayer. Starkad strongly admonished Ingild and humiliated his queen who tried to calm Starkad with kindness and her costly ribbon. Starkad succeeded in exciting Ingild to kill Swerting's sons and to divorce his Saxon bride.

During the Battle of the Brávellir between the Swedish king Sigurd Hring and Harald Wartooth (Haraldus Hyldetan), Starkad fought on the Swedish side. He received such a severe wound that his lung hung out, his skull was cleft and a finger was cut off. He had to leave the battle to tend to his wounds.

Starkad was accepted with honour in the warband of the Norwegian hero Olo. However, when Olo had succeeded in conquering Zealand, Starkad was convinced to join Lennius/Lenus/Lennus scheme to attack and kill Olo. However, Olo was hard to kill as his gaze scared everyone. It was not until Starkad managed to cover Olo's face that he could kill him. Starkad was rewarded with 120 pounds in gold, but regretted his crime, and avenged Olo's death by killing Lennius.

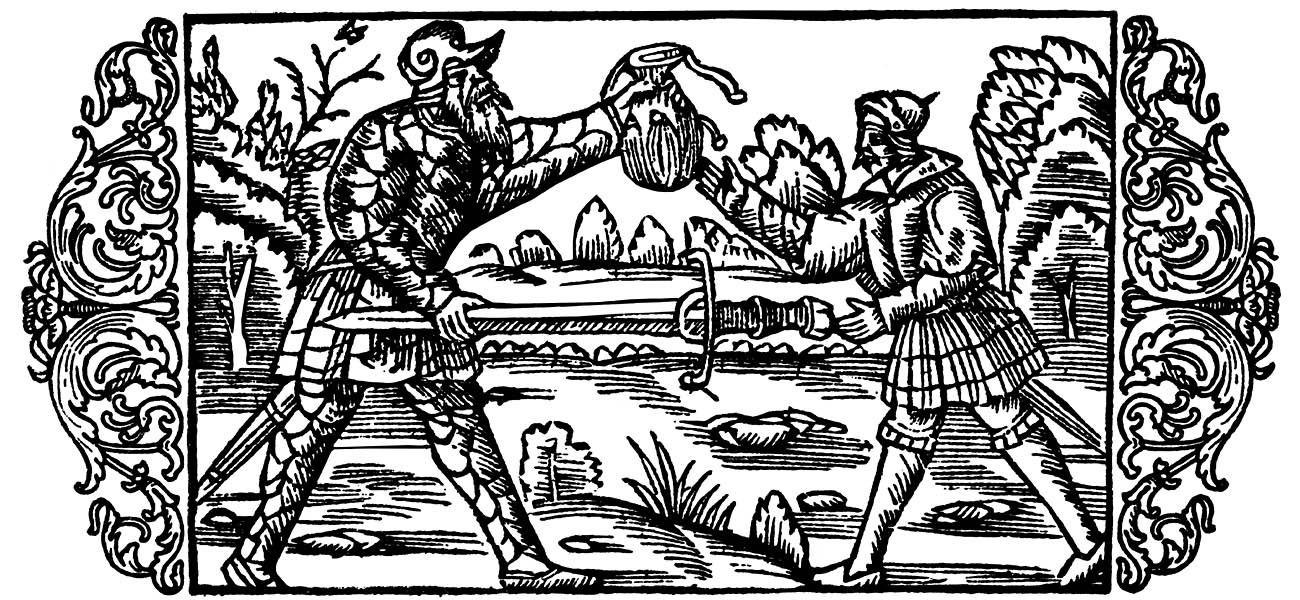
Starkad arranges his own demise, from Olaus Magnus' Historia de gentibus septentrionalibus (1555).

When Starkad was so old that he wished to die and his eyesight was bad, he hung his gold around his neck and went out to wander. He killed a man who wanted one of his swords and some riders who were contracted to kill Starkad by Hather (Hatherus), Lennius' son.

In front of Hather, Starkad sung about his accomplishments, and as Hather's response showed Starkad that Hather was of noble birth, Starkad asked him to be his slayer. Starkad promised Hather all his gold and imperviousness, should Hather cut off his head and run between the head and the body as he fell. Hather cut off Starkad's head but avoided running, as he feared being crushed by Starkad's huge body. When the head had hit the ground, it bit a tussock of grass which showed how ferocious Starkad was.

Hather did not want the old warrior to lie unburied, but showed him respect by making a barrow for him on the heath of Roljung, at the same spot where Starkad's heavy body long ago had made an imprint on a stone.

== Historia de gentibus septentrionalibus ==
Olaus Magnus' cites the story of Starkad from Gesta Danorum. He disputes Saxo about origin of the hero and informs that Starkad was from the nation of Tavastians, 'Starchaterum Thauestum'.

== Later traditions ==
Later medieval traditions locate Starkad's death and the heath of Roljung to Skåne. According to the Annales Ryenses (late 13th century), it was still possible to see Starkad's sword in the water beneath the bridge of Boilyngh when the water was low. It is likely that Boilyngh is a misspelling of Roljung. Later this spot was located to Rönne river, and in the 16th century, people talked of the Stones of Starkkarl at Vegeholm. The Danish folklorist Axel Olrik and Arthur Stille recorded many recent traditions about Starkad in north-western Skåne. The Dano-Norweginan pastor and folklorist Magnus Landstad likewise noted that, although the tradition was mostly gone at his own time, the people of the upper Telemark remembered at least one story where Starkad was mentioned by name.

== Modern references ==
The plot of the Science Fiction novel "Ensign Flandry" by the Danish American writer Poul Anderson takes place on a planet named "Starkad". Anderson also included a short story about the meeting of Nornagest and Starkad in his book The Boat of a Million Years, in which both Nornagest and Starkad are part of a small group of humans who were born with an exceedingly rare genetic condition that makes them immortal.

The modern Danish name, Stærkodder has been used for an ironclad warship in the Royal Danish Navy.

In The Fionavar Tapestry trilogy by the Canadian author Guy Gavriel Kay, the fortress of Starkadh is the stronghold of the evil god Rakoth Maugrim.

In The Settlers (novel) by Vilhelm Moberg, the main protagonists names the first ox he buys after emigrating to North America Starkodder.

Starkad (or "Starkadder") is the central figure in a trilogy of fantasy novels by the author Bernard King, which draw heavily from traditional Starkad stories and from other aspects of Norse myth and legend. The trilogy comprises the novels "Starkadder" (1985), "Vargr-Moon" (1986), and "Death-Blinder" (1988).

Starkad, as Starkaðr the Mighty, is mentioned in the 2018 videogame God of War, as a late Jotunn enshrined by the Jotnar people. Mimir relates how Thor killed him by ripping off six of his arms.

== Sources and external links ==
- The article Starkad in Nordisk familjebok (1909)
- The article Starkad in Nationalencyklopedin.
- Northvegr website: Ynglinga saga
- The Story of Norna-Gest in English translation by George L. Hardman
- On-Line Medieval and Classical History: The Danish History books I-IX, translated by Oliver Elton (Norroena Society, New York, 1905).
- Hervarar saga in translation by Tunstall, at Northvegr.
- Gautrek's saga:
  - Ancestry: Gautrek's saga
  - "King Gautrek" in Seven Viking Romances. Trans. Pálsson, Hermann and Edwards, Paul (1985). Harmondsworth, England: Penguin. ISBN 0-14-044474-2.
  - "King Gautrek" in Gautrek's Saga and other medieval tales. Trans. Pálsson, Hermann and Edwards, Paul (1968). London: University of London Press. ISBN 0-340-09396-X.
  - Gautrek's Saga. Trans. Fox, Denton and Pálsson, Hermann (1974). Toronto: University of Toronto Press. ISBN 0-8020-1925-0.
  - Gautreks saga in Old Norse from heimskringla.no
  - Snerpa: Netúgáfan: Fornrit: Gautreks saga
  - University of Oregon: Norse: Fornaldarsögur norðurlanda: Gautreks saga
  - Sagnanet: Gautreks saga
- Beowulf:
  - Old English edition edited by James Albert Harrison and Robert Sharp
- Translations of Beowulf:
  - Modern English translation by Francis Barton Gummere
  - Modern English translation by John Lesslie Hall
