= Anafielas =

- Anapilis, a fictional mountain in pagan Lithuanian mythology
- Anafielas, a 1843–1846 poem by Józef_Ignacy_Kraszewski
