= Gaut =

Deity

Gaut (Old Norse: Gautr, from a Proto-Germanic *Gautaz) is an early Germanic name which represents a mythical ancestor or national god in the origin myth of the Geats.

== Etymology ==
Gautaz may be connected to the name of the Swedish river Göta älv at the city of Gothenburg. Early inhabitants of present-day Götaland called themselves Geats (Swedish: Götar), derived from a Proto-Germanic singular *Gautaz, plural *Gautôz, assumed to have meant "to pour".

The Geatish ethnonym *gautaz is related to the ethnonym of the Goths and of the Gutes (inhabitants of the island of Gotland), deriving from Proto-Germanic *gutô (cf. Gothic Gut-þiuda, Old Norse gotar or gutar).

== Accounts ==
The German chronicler Johannes Aventinus (ca. 1525) reported Gothus as one of 20 dukes who accompanied Tuisto into Europe, settling Gothaland as his personal fief, during the reign of Nimrod at Babel. The Swede Johannes Magnus around the same time as Aventinus, wrote that Gothus or Gethar, also known as Gogus or Gog, was one of Magog's sons, who became first king of the Goths (Geats) in Gothaland. Magnus separately listed Gaptus as son and successor of Berig, first king of the Goths south of the Baltic.

== Theonym ==
Gautr is also one of the Eddaic names of Odin in Norse mythology, but also as an alternative form of the name Gauti, who was one of Odin's sons, and the founder of the kingdom of the Geats, Götaland (Gautland/Geatland), in Bósa saga ok Herrauðs (c. 1300). This Gautr/Gauti also appears as the father of the recurrent and undatable Geatish king Gautrekr in that saga, and several other sagas produced between 1225 and 1310.

== Anglo-Saxon royal genealogies ==
Some versions of the English royal line of Wessex add names above that of Woden, purportedly giving Woden's ancestry, but the names are now usually thought be from another royal lineage erroneously added to the standard genealogy.

Some of the genealogies end in Geat (or Geata) who is identified as an ancestor of Woden, and father of Godwulf. Geat, it is reasonable to think, might be Gaut. Others continue with Geat's father, Tatwa (Tetuua), and even further, stretching back to Adam. In the Life of Alfred (893), Asser states that the pagans worshipped Geat himself, for a long time, as a god. He quotes a disdainful verse attributed to Coelius Sedulius (5th century).

The 10th-century poem of Deor briefly mentions Geat and his wife, Maethehilde. The account in the Historia Britonum (c. 835; generally attributed to Nennius) says that Geat was considered the son of a god by the heathens of England. Elsewhere, it names Gothus, a son of Armenon, as the Goths' ancestor.

== See also ==
- Gaute
- Germanic mythology
