= Ferkingstad Church =

Church in Rogaland, Norway

- Ferkingstad kirke
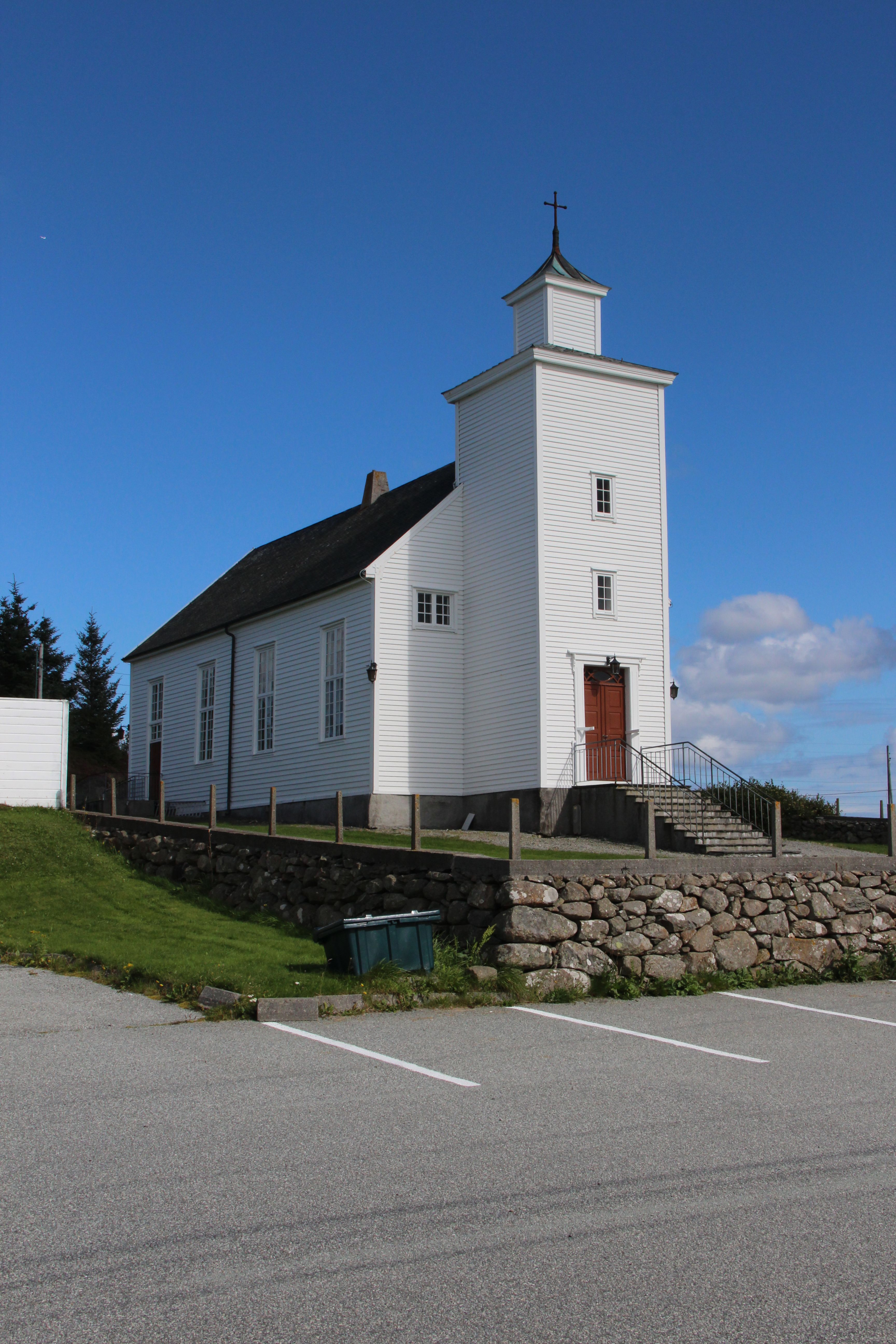
- View of the church
- Ferkingstad Church
- 59.207538°N 5.184723°E
- Location: Karmøy Municipality, Rogaland
- Country: Norway
- Denomination: Church of Norway
- Churchmanship: Evangelical Lutheran

History
- Status: Parish church
- Founded: 16th century
- Consecrated: 1853

Architecture
- Functional status: Active
- Architect: Hans Linstow
- Architectural type: Long church
- Completed: 1853

Specifications
- Capacity: 300
- Materials: Wood

Administration
- Diocese: Stavanger bispedømme
- Deanery: Karmøy prosti
- Parish: Ferkingstad
- Norwegian Cultural Heritage Site
- Type: Church
- Status: Not protected
- ID: 84125

Ferkingstad Church (Norwegian: Ferkingstad kirke) is a parish church of the Church of Norway in Karmøy Municipality in Rogaland county, Norway. It is located in the village of Ferkingstad on the western side of the island of Karmøy. It is the church for the Ferkingstad parish which is part of the Karmøy prosti (deanery) in the Diocese of Stavanger. The white, wooden church was built in a long church design in 1853 using designs by the architect Hans Linstow. The church seats about 300 people.

== History ==
The earliest existing historical records of the church date back to the year 1620, but it was likely built in the late 1500s. It is possible that there was another church located at Ferkingstad prior to this one, but there are no existing records to confirm that. The only basis for this conjecture is that the records of the church from the 1600s state that the church inventory was described as old and worn, meaning the inventory for the church may have been reused from a previous church on the site.

In 1853-1854, a new church was constructed about 2.5 kilometres (1.6 mi) to the south of the old church site. The new church was consecrated on 26 July 1854. After the new church was completed, the old church was torn down.

== Media gallery ==
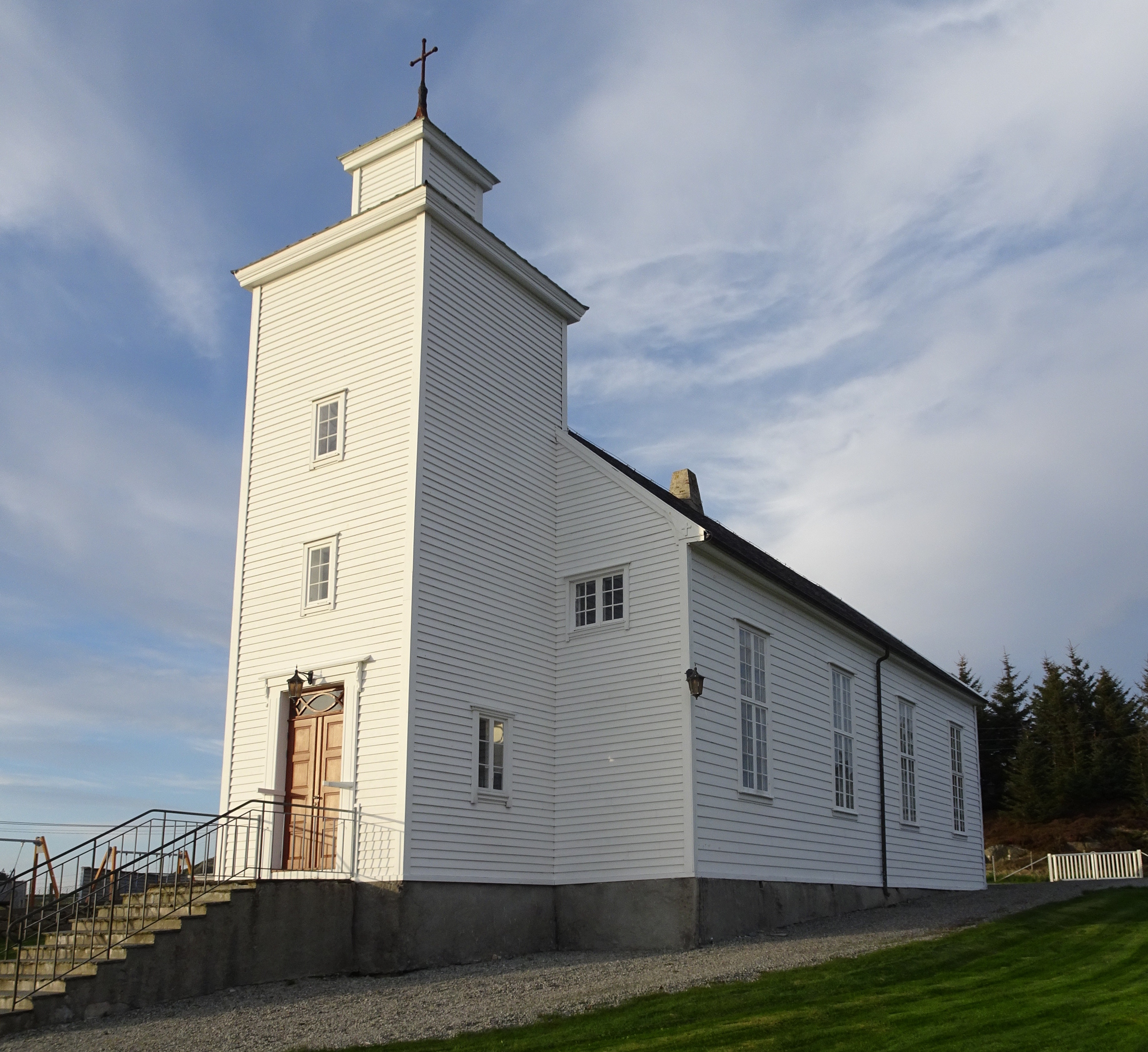
View of the church

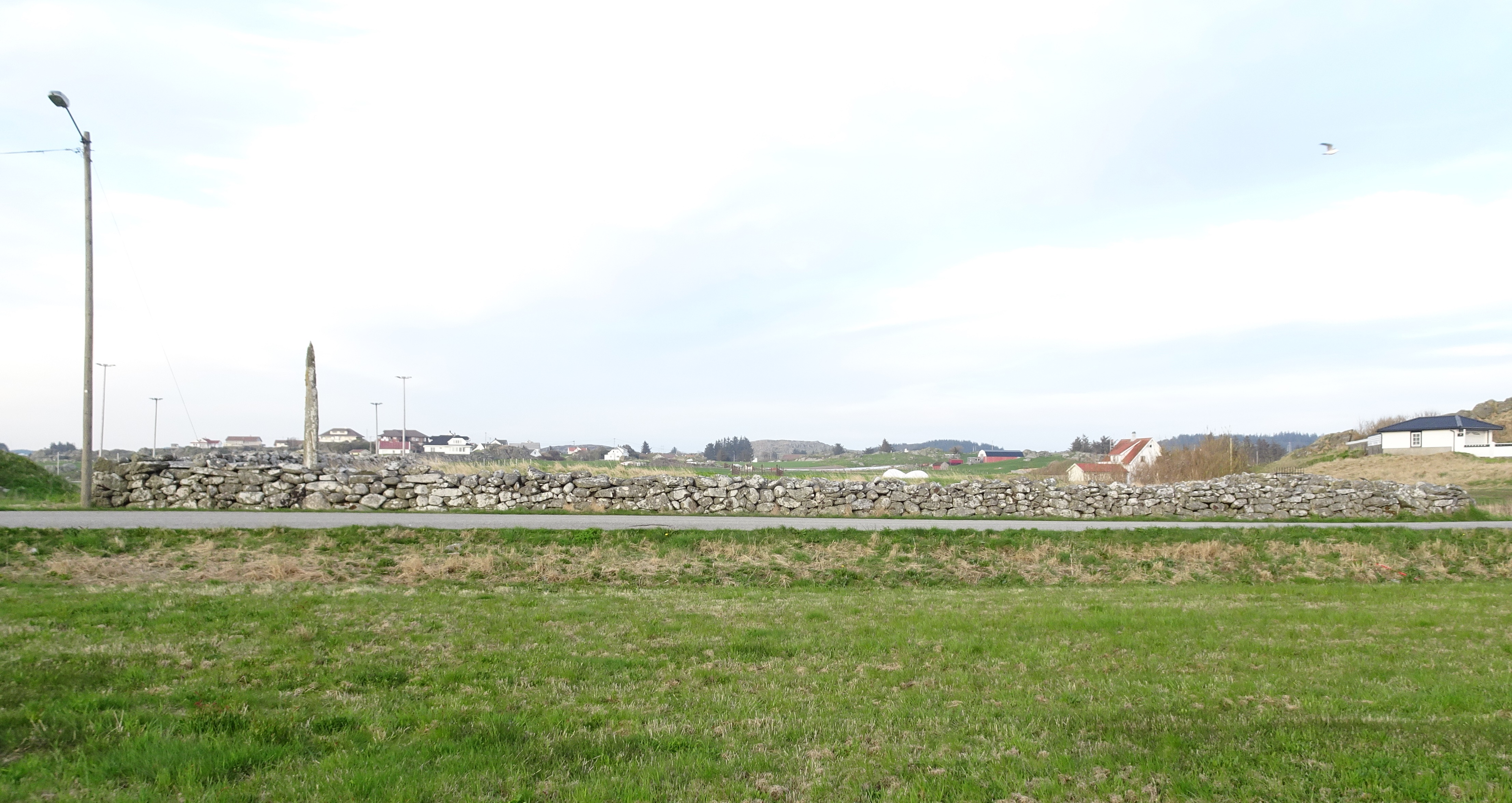
Old site of the church (prior to 1853)

== See also ==
- List of churches in Rogaland
