= Mac Sitric =

Irish family name

Mac Shitric
- Mac Shitric in a Gaelic type.
- Gender: Masculine
- Language: Irish

Other gender
- Feminine: Nic Shitric, Bean Mhic Shitric, Mhic Shitric

Origin
- Language: Irish
- Meaning: "son of Sitreac"

Other names
- Variant form: Mag Shitric

Mac Sitric is a masculine surname in the Irish language. The name translates into English as "son of Sitreac". The surname originated as a patronym, however it no longer refers to the actual name of the bearer's father. The form Nic Sitric is borne by unmarried females; the forms Bean Mhic Sitric and Mhic Shitric are borne by married females. A variant form of Mac Sitric is Mag Sitric; the feminine forms of this surname are Nig Sitric, Bean Mhig Sitric, and Mhig Sitric. All these Irish surnames have various Anglicised forms.

== Etymology ==
Mac Shitric translates into English as "son of Sitreac". A variant form of the surname is Mag Sitric. These surnames originated as patronyms, however they no longer refer to the actual name of the bearer's father. The name Sitreac is a Gaelic derivative of the Old Norse Sigtryggr. This Old Norse personal name is composed of two elements: the first, Sig-, means "victory"; the second element, -tryggr, means "true".

== Feminine forms ==
Mac Sitric and Mag Sitric are masculine surnames. The form of Mac Sitric for unmarried females is Nic Sitric, whereas the (unmarried) feminine form of Mag Sitric is Nig Sitric; these names translate into English as "daughter of the son of Sitreac. The form of Mac Sitric for married females is Bean Mhic Sitric, whereas the feminine form of Mag Sitric is Bean Mhig Sitric; these particular feminine names also rendered simply as Mhic Sitric and Mhig Sitric; these four surnames translate to "wife of the son of Sitreac.

== Anglicised forms ==
Mac Sitric has been Anglicised variously as MacKittrick, MacKitterick, MacKettrick, MacKetterick, MacKirtrick, Munkittrick, Munkettrick, Kittrick, Kitterick, and Setright. Anglicised forms of Mag Sitric include MacGetrick, MacGetterick.

== See also ==
- Irish people
- Sigtrygg
