= Sihtric =

Sihtric or Sitric is an Anglo-Saxon personal name that is cognate with the Old Norse Sigtrygg.

People called Sihtric or Sitric, include:

- Sitric Cáech (died 927), ruler of Dublin and then Viking Northumbria in the early 10th century
- Sitric II of Northumbria (fl. c. 942), ruler of Northumbria in the 10th century
- Sihtric (Abbot of Tavistock) (died 1082), Anglo-Saxon clergyman
- Sitric the Dane, an 11th-century ruler of Waterford
- Sitric mac Ualgairg, king of Breifne 1256/7
