= Anapilis =

Mountain in Lithuanian mythology

Anapilis is a fictional mountain, allegedly the place of the afterlife in the pagan mythology of ancient Lithuanians.

== Etymology ==
Anapilis is Lithuanized from Polish Anafielas, and "back-etymologized" in Lithuanian as "ana" (that) + "pilis" (castle). Anafielas was recorded or invented by Teodor Narbutt in his 1835 volume of Dzieje starożytne narodu litewskiego. Narbutt is the only independent source of the term. Since he is known to invent a large number of pseudo-pagan deities, in modern times Anapilis/Anafielas is considered pseudo-mythological as well. Still, it is well entrenched in the modern Lithuanian culture. As Bronys Savukynas put it, "one of the most frequently used Narbutas’s false names is the name of ancient Lithuanian paradise – Anapilis." One of Lithuanian euphemisms for "to die" is "to go to Anapilis" or "to travel to Anapilis" (Lithuanian: "išeiti anapilin", "iškeliauti anapilin").

== Genesis of the myth ==
In Dzieje starożytne narodu litewskiego, Narbutt published the following story, footnoting that it was picked in a rural area near Kretinga in Samogitia.

Tales about the place to be after death were like that. There is a mountain very high, a steep, inaccessible rock, called Anafielas, onto which shadows must climb. Therefore, long [finger and toe] nails, claws of animals, weapons, horses, servants, etc., are needed to get onto it more quickly. And the richer a man was, the more difficult was his access: for earthly possessions weigh heavily on the soul: a poor one, light as a feather, can climb the mountain, if he has not offended the gods in his life. Otherwise, dragon Wizunas, who lives under the mountain, will tear the sinful rich apart and a poor sinner will be carried away by bad winds. A god being which dwells on the top of this mountain, which is full of justice, judges the dead by their deeds done while alive. Everyone according to her judgment receives an eternal reward or punishment.

Most probably Narbutt combined two old sources: Gesta Danorum (12–13th centuries) of Saxo Grammaticus and the Bychowiec Chronicle (16th century). The Chronicle tells a similar story about a steep mountain onto which one had to climb with the help of animal claws. Narbutt edited and published the Chronicle in 1835. From Narbutt's correspondence it is known that he got the original of Chronicle in early 1834, so it is plausible Narbutt used it in his works. A similar motif of dead climbing up with the help of animals' claws is found in some other chronicles.

On the other hand, Saxo Grammaticus wrote the following:

Eximiae opinionis gladiator, nomine Wisinnus, apud Rusciam rupem, quae Anafial dicitur, sede et mansione complexus vicinas longinquasque provincias omni inuriae genere vexavit. (A warrior of excellent opinion, named Wisinnus, having settled his seat and mansion near a rock in Ruscia, which is called Anafial, harassed the neighboring and distant provinces with every kind of iniquity.

The villain Wisinnus was slain by a hero Starcatherus (see Starkad#Gesta Danorum). One may only guess why Narbutt decided to use the name Anafial (and the name of Narbutt's dragon Wizunas sounds much like the Saxon villain Wisinnus) from Scandinavian tales on an allegedly Lithuanian myth.

Narbutt's myth was popularized in the 19th century by, among others, Polish writer Józef Ignacy Kraszewski, who wrote an epic trilogy under the common title Anafielas, subtitled A Song from the Lithuanian Tales. The word "anafielas" was recorded in a number of dictionaries as a genuine element of the Lithuanian mythology.

== In popular culture ==
- Józef Ignacy Kraszewski, Anafielas: A Song from the Lithuanian Tales, an epic trilogy (1843–1846)
- Andrius Mamontovas, album Anapilis (2000)
- Villa Anapilis in Palanga (1898)
- Anapilis Halls, Mississauga, Ontario, Canada, of the Anapilis Christian Community Centre. Among other things, it houses Lithuanian Museum - Archives of Canada

== See also ==
- Underworld
