= Stolt Herr Alf =

Medieval Scandinavian ballad

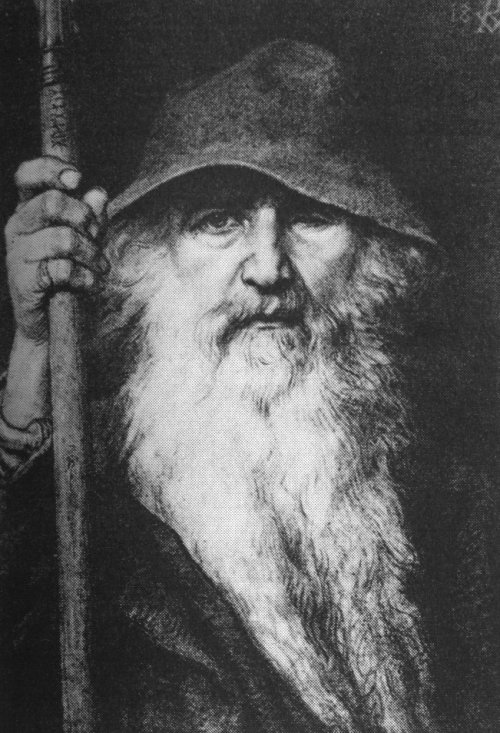
In this medieval ballad, the pagan god Odin gives advice on how to safely dispose of an undesirable man. An 1886 depiction of Odin by Georg von Rosen.

"Stolt Herr Alf" ("Proud Lord Alf", SMB 206, TSB E 58) or "Álvur kongur" (CCF 14) is a medieval Scandinavian ballad with Swedish and Faroese variants, based on the same legendary material as the Icelandic legendary saga Hálfs saga ok Hálfsrekka, from pre-Christian times. There are two different manuscripts of this ballad in the National Library of Sweden, and some dialectal words indicate that the ballad was current in south-western Sweden before its documentation.

The Norse god Odin is appealed to with an epithet which has aroused scholarly interest, and he is called Oden Asagrim, meaning "Odin, leader of the Æsir". The suffix -grim is a virtually unique word for "leader" which is otherwise only attested in the runestone Sö 126, but in the earlier form grimR. It is not attested as a noun in the sense "leader" in West Norse sources. In Old Norse, the basic meaning of the adjective grimmr is "heartless, strict and wicked", and so grimmr is comparable in semantics to Old Norse gramr which meant both "wrath", "king" and "warrior".

== Synopsis ==
The ballad tells that Lord Alf's wife woke up from a nightmare. She informed her husband that she had dreamt that she had seen a stone and brick house at her father's estate in which her husband had been burnt to death with his retinue.

Lord Alf told his wife that she must not worry and instead go to sleep again. The next day Lord Alf rode to his father-in-law, King Asmund, with his retinue and asked the king for a house where they could sleep during the night. King Asmund told them that they could sleep in a house at the orchard.

The king then appealed to Odin:

Hielp nu Odin Asagrim Jagh tränger nu til tig kalla, At jagh må vinna her stolten Alf, At jagh blir uten skade.	Odin, leader of the Æsir, I need to call upon you now, That I may defeat proud lord Alf, With no harm to myself.

Odin responded that King Asmund should bar the door of Lord Alf's house and set its gables aflame. In that way, he could defeat Lord Alf without incurring any harm.

Toward the end of the ballad, the people decide to take vengeance and slay King Asmund because he refused to pay weregild—usual punishment, according to medieval Scandinavian laws when a killer refuses to pay weregild (as in the story) or commits quickfire.
