= Gaute Kivistik =

Estonian humorist and journalist

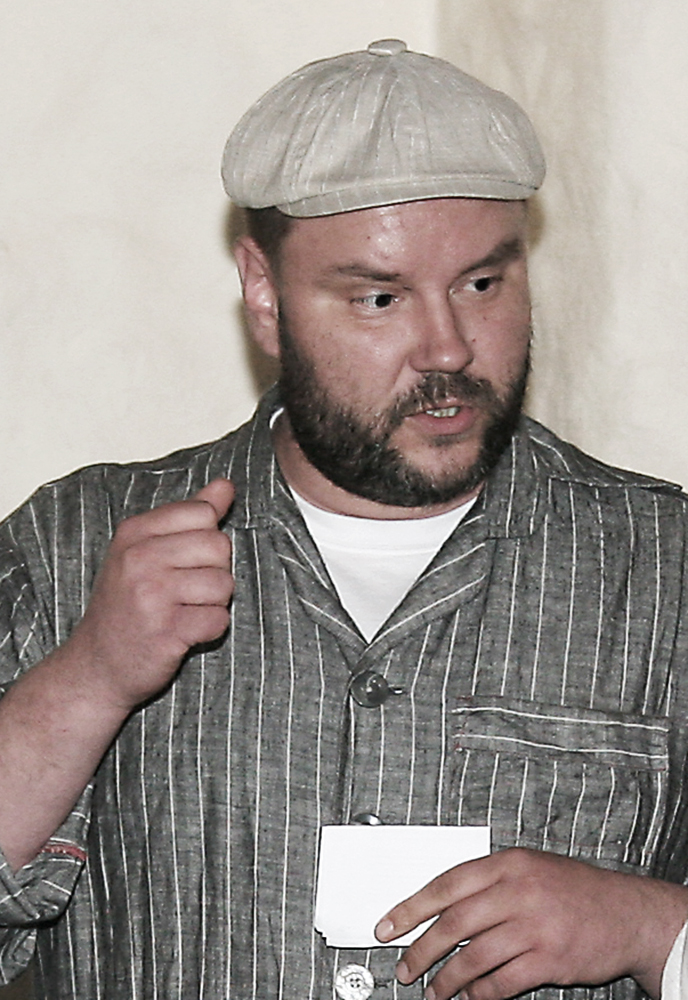
Gaute Kivistik (2007)

Gaute Kivistik (born 18 June 1971 in Tartu), better known under his pen name of Rohke Debelak (or Debelakk), is an Estonian humorist and journalist, best known as the author and presenter of a satirical news programme on Raadio Kuku.

== Awards ==
In 2008, Kivistik was awarded the yearly Oskar Luts humour prize, named after the Estonian writer Oskar Luts.
