= Vetrliði Sumarliðason =

Vetrliði Sumarliðason (Old Norse: [ˈwetz̠ˌliðe ˈsumɑz̠ˌliðɑˌson]; Modern Icelandic: Veturliði Sumarliðason [ˈvɛːtʏrˌlɪːðɪ ˈsʏːmarˌlɪːðaˌsɔːn]) was a 10th-century Icelandic skald.

He was the great-grandson of Ketill hængr ("salmon"), one of the settlers of Iceland. He lived in Fljótshlíð, in the south of the island.

Vetrliði was pagan and opposed the conversion to Christianity. He composed defamatory verses (níð) about Þangbrandr, a missionary sent to Iceland by Óláfr Tryggvason. He was killed by the priest (or by the priest and his companion Guðleifr Arason). In some versions, another skald, Þorvaldr veili, was murdered for the same reason. A stanza was composed by an unknown author about Vetrliði's death:

Ryðfjónar gekk reynir
randa suðr á landi
beðs í bœnar smiðju
Baldrs sigtólum halda;
siðreynir lét síðan
snjallr morðhamar gjalla
hauðrs í hattar steðja
hjaldrs Vetrliða skaldi.

— Diana Whaley's edition
Translation:

He who proved his blade on bucklers,
South went through the land to whet
Brand that oft hath felled his foeman,
Gainst the forge which foams with song;
Mighty wielder of war's sickle
Made his sword's avenging edge
Hard on hero's helm-prop rattle,
Skull of Weatherlid the Skald.

— The Story of Burnt Njal (98), Dasent's translation

This episode is related in many sources: Kristni saga, Landnámabók, Brennu-Njáls saga, Snorri Sturluson's Óláfs saga Tryggvasonar and Óláfs saga Tryggvasonar en mesta.

Only one stanza of his work survived, a lausavísa praising Thor for having killed giants and giantesses:

Thou didst break the leg of Leikn,
Didst cause to stoop Starkadr,
Didst bruise Thrívaldi,
Didst stand on lifeless Gjálp.

—Skáldskaparmál (11), Brodeur's translation
