= Ferkingstad =

Village in Karmøy Municipality, Norway

- Village
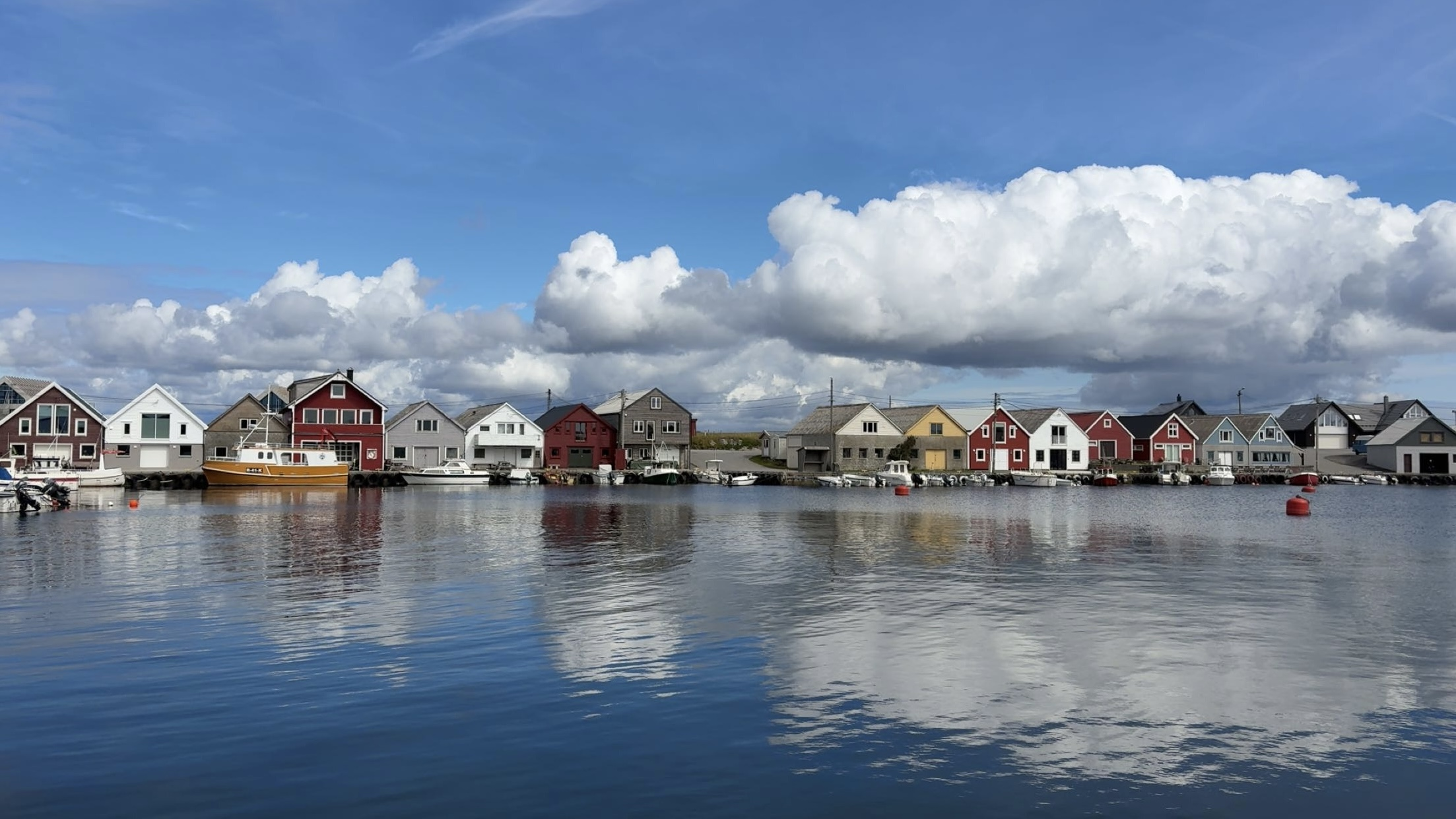
- Ferkingstad harbour
- Interactive map of Ferkingstad
- Coordinates: 59.22416°N 5.19689°E
- Country: Norway
- Region: Western Norway
- County: Rogaland
- District: Haugaland
- Municipality: Karmøy Municipality
- Elevation: 9 m (30 ft)
- Time zone: UTC+01:00 (CET)
  - Summer (DST): UTC+02:00 (CEST)
- Post Code: 4274 Stol

Ferkingstad is a village in Karmøy Municipality in Rogaland county, Norway. The village is located on the western shore of the island of Karmøy, immediately south of the town of Åkrahamn and a few minutes north of the village of Sandve. Ferkingstad is known for its highly rich archaeological finds, ranging from the early Viking Age to the late medieval era. Ferkingstad Church is located in the village.

== History ==
Legend claims that King Ferking is supposed to have founded the village and lived at Ferkingstad, where he had built large houses of stones. Ferkingstad is known for the remains of the large boat houses dating from the Iron Age which were reportedly erected by King Ferking. The legends also tell of the King's fortress (Kongsborgen), which was burnt to the ground during the 7th century. The Fartegn estate was later raised on the same site by Ferking's son, who also bore the name Fartegn.
