= Mercurius Hranno =

Germanic god

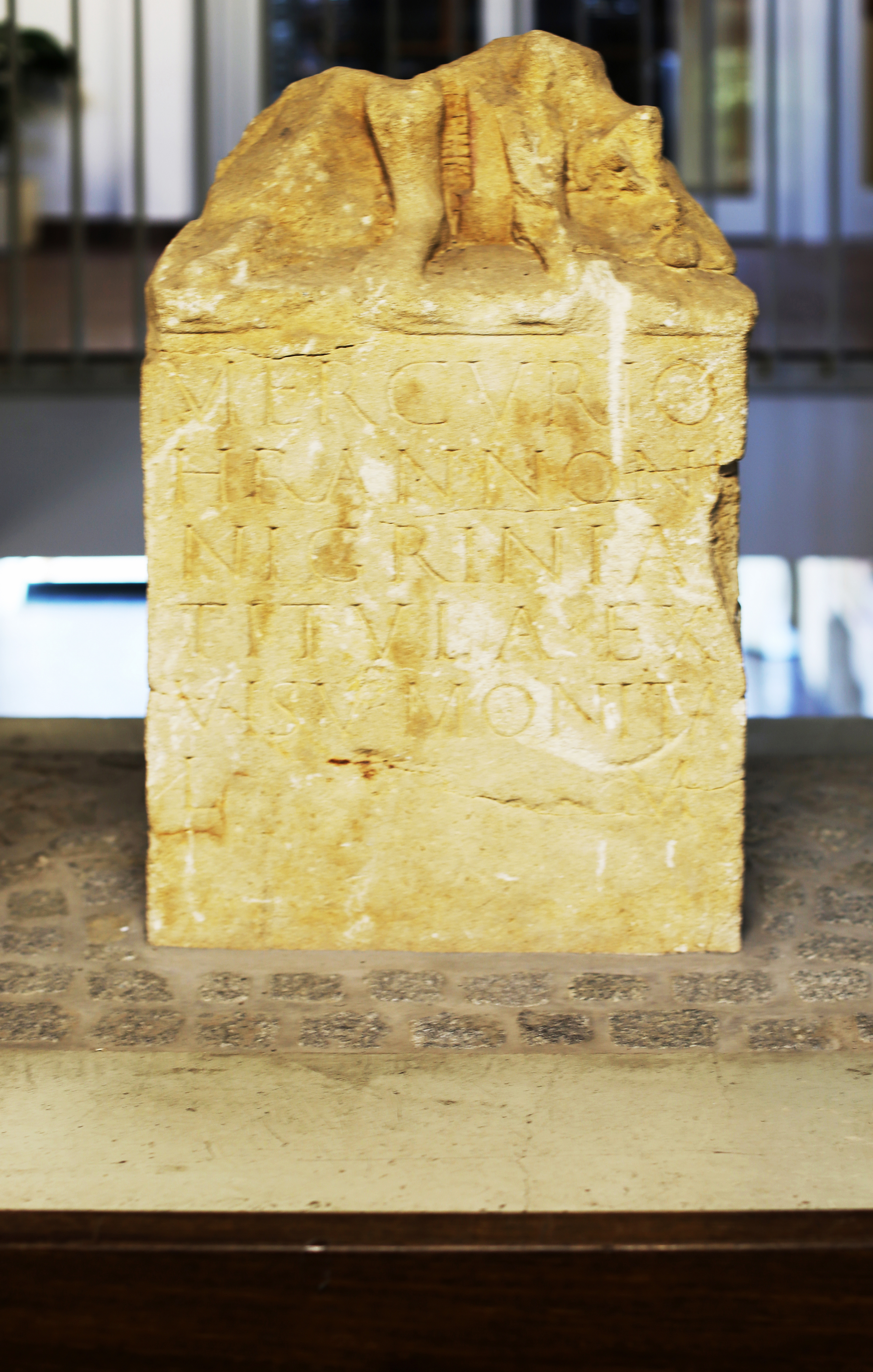
Consecration stone for Mercurius Hranno, 2.-3. Century AD FO. District Hemmerich-Kardorf (Bornheim)

Mercurius Hranno is a Germanic god, who is only attested in one dedicatory inscription from the 2nd to 3rd century in Hümmerich, a district of the town of Bornheim. The epithet, derived from a Germanic word, is associated with the Old Norse alias of Odin, "Hrani". From this find it is inferred that the local Germanic tribe, the Ubii, worshipped Odin. In Old Norse, "Hranno" means "rough guy" or "loudmouth", alluding to an aspect of the personality of Odin.

== Discovery and description ==
In Hümmerich, a heavily damaged statuette of Mercury, with an inscription at its base, was ploughed up during field work and initially deposited unnoticed on the edge of the field. In 1984 the epigraphic and archaeological value of the piece was recognised and it was handed it over to the Rheinisches Landesmuseum Bonn for scientific examination.

The statuette is made from Lorraine limestone and measures 79cm by 31.2cm by 58.8cm. The statuette is in the form of an Aedicula. It is broken off in the middle of the lower leg. The back of the base is severely damaged and was originally roughly smoothed. A krater with s-shaped handles is carved on each side of the base. Out from the mouths of the kraters are entwined ornamental foliage. From what has survived, a turtle and the tail feathers of a rooster are visible. Between the legs of Mercury there is an angular object, which perhaps once continued to the head of the statuette as an arrow- or spear-like object. In general, the execution is unremarkable. It does not deviate iconographically from other representations of Mercury in Germania Inferior. Such elements as the turtle and the rooster are common. Several other stones consecrated to Mercury have been found in the Sechtem district of Bornheim, prompting some archaeologists to suggest that the area once had a sanctuary to Mercury. If so, the Mercurius-Hranno statuette may have originally stood in this sanctuary, later being removed to Hemmerich. The stone is currently in the possession of the city of Bornheim. A replica is held by the Rheinisches Landesmuseum Bonn.

== Inscription ==
On the front of the pedestal, in six lines on the 43 cm × 48.5 cm base, the dedicatory inscription is written. The inscription is almost intact and is written in the usual majuscule.

Mercurio / Hrannon / Nigrinia / Titula ex / visu monita / l(ibens) m(erito)

"To Mercurius Hranno, Nigrinia Titul(l)a dedicated this, after heeding the warning, eagerly and justly."

The donor was a woman. The name of the donor Nigrinia (a derivative of the nomen Nigrinius) has the peculiarity that it is only documented in Gallia Belgica and Germania. The agnomen Titul(l)us has a distribution generally outside the northern provinces. It is attested with, for example, in 35 places in the Gallia Narbonensis and only two places in Gallia Belgica and Germania together. The formula ex visu monita, "after heeding the warning", is not a common one in Germania. It is the only known example from Germania Inferior and is only attested three times in the northwest (two in Gallia Belgica, one in the Germania Superior).

== Surname ==
The striking agnomen of Mercurius can be derived as the dative form of the nominative "Hranno". The Germanic hr- prefix, which phonetically derives the Indo-European kr-, allows us to identify the word as Germanic. Interpretatio Romana associated the Germanic god Odin with Mercury, so we can assume that Hranno represents an epithet of Odin. To clarify the epithet Norbert Wagner draws evidence from Germanic personal names.

Wagner cites the use of a name like "Hranno" as an alias of Odin. In the fornaldarsaga of Hrólfs saga kraka, Odin appears disguised as a farmer named Hrani. This saga, attested from the 14th century, is a revised version of a much older original. He also cites personal and place names of early to high medieval Scandinavia. In Old Norse (as well as Modern Icelandic) "Hrani" is an appelation applied to loudmouths, rough guys, and braggarts. A derived adjectival form is "hranalegr", with the meaning of "harsh, rough, ruthless". It follows that in "Hranno" is a descriptive appelation of Odin.

Wagner also cites the Old English poem Widsith in which "Hronum", the Old English dative plural of the nominative plural "Hronan", is the name of a tribe.

Norbert Wagner and Günter Neumann emphasize the significance of this epithet, which emphasizes an aspect of the personality of Odin. The epithet is attested both in an early inscription and in later saga literature, which Neumann sees as an example of well-attested linguistic conservatism of the north of Germania. The question of why a woman has offered veneration to this explicitly masculine deity will probably remain unclear, depending on future archaeological finds.

== Bibliography ==
- Gerhard Bauchhenß, "Mercurius in Bornheim" with Anna-Barbara Follmann-Schulz, Michael Weiss und Norbert Wagner. In: Bonner Jahrbücher. Vol. 188, 1988, pp. 223–239.
  - In Bauchhenß's article: Norbert Wagner, "Ein neugefundener Wodansname". In: Bonner Jahrbücher. Vol. 188, 1988, S. 238–239.
- Günter Neumann Namenstudien zum Altgermanischen. Ergänzungsbände zum Reallexikon der Germanischen Altertumskunde. Vol. 59. De Gruyter, Berlin/New York 2008, ISBN 978-3-11-020100-0, S. 63.
