= Óðins nöfn =

Skaldic poem

Óðins nöfn is an anonymous skaldic poem, one of the þulur found in a section called Viðbótarþulur in Skáldskaparmál in Snorri Sturluson's Prose Edda.

It lists the names of Odin.
