= Gard Agdi =

Legendary Norse figure

Gard Agdi (Old Norse Garðr agði) appears in the legendary genealogies of Hversu Noregr byggdist as one of the three sons of Nór, the legendary first king of Norway, and as ruler and ancestor of rulers over southwestern Norway. The nickname Agdi may refer to a member of the Egðir, a tribe inhabiting the southernmost region of Norway known as Agder, represented today by Agder county.

== Descendants of Gard ==
=== Sons of Gard ===
Gard was father of seven sons: Hörd (Hǫrðr), Rúgálf (Rúgálfr), Thrym (Þrymr), Végard (Végarðr), Freygard (Freygarðr), Thorgard (Þorgarðr), and Grjótgard (Grójtgarðr),

==== Descendants of Hörd and Rúgálf ====
According to the Hversu, Hörd son of Gard, the eponym of Hördaland (the former county of Hordaland) was father of Jöfur (Jǫfurr) or Jösur (Jǫsurr).

The Hversu goes on to say that Rúgálf son of Gard, the eponym of Rogaland, was father of Rögnvald (Rögnvaldr), the father of Ögvald (Ǫgvaldr) but gives no further descendants.

But Hálfs saga ok Hálfsrekka ('The saga of Half and his heroes'), brings in King Ögvald of Rogaland at its beginning (though making no mention of Ögvald's ancestry) and in this work it is Ögvald who is the father of Jösur.

The Hversu and the Hálf's saga do agree in their accounts of the descendants of Jösur. Jösur was father of King Hjör (Hjǫrr) who in the saga was king of both Hördaland and Rogaland. Hjör was father of Hjörleif the Ladies' Man (Hjǫrleifr inn kvensamr) who had three wives.

By Æsa the Fair, daughter of Jarl Eystein of Valdres, Hjörleif was father of Ótrygg (Ótryggr), the father of Óblaud (Óblauðr), the father of Högni the White (Hǫgni inn hvítr), the father of Úlf the Squinter (Úlfr inn skjálgr).

Hjörleif then also married Hild the Slender (Hildr in mjóva) daughter of Högni of Njardey (Njarðey 'Njörd's-Isle', modern Nærøya). By Hild the Slender Hjörleif was father of Hjörólf (Hjǫrólfr) and Hálf (Hálf), this last being the hero of the saga. According to the saga and the Landnámabók (2.19 and following), Hálf was father of Hjör who married Hagný daughter of Haki, son of Hámund (Hámundr). Their children were the twins Hámund Hellskin (Hámundr heljarskinn) and Geirmund Hellskin (Geirmundr heljarskinn). Geirmund Hellskin settled in Iceland with his kinsman Úlf the Squinter. The Landnámabók describes Geirmund as a war-king who had dominions in Rogaland but names a certain Sulki as the true king of Rogaland, as do other accounts. However Grettis saga ('Saga of Grettir') states that Hördaland belonged to Geirmund and that Sulki ruled only South Rogaland.

The son of Geirmund's brother Hámund was Thorir-at-Espihól (Þórir á Espihóli) who also appears as a settler in Iceland in Icelandic accounts.

==== Descendants of Gard's other sons ====
Thrym ruled Agdir. He fathered Agdi (Agði) and Agnar (Agnarr). Agnar was father of Ketil Thrym (Ketill Þrymr) who had land at Thrumu in Agdir.

Végard ruled Signafylki, that is the eastern part of the old county Sogn og Fjordane. Végard was the father of Vedrorm (Vedrormr), the father of Vémund the Old (Vémundr inn gamli) who was called Sygnatrausti. The Gríms saga lodinkinna (Gríms saga loðinkinna 'Saga of Grim Hairy-cheek') tells at the end that Vedrorm, son of Vémund the Old, was a powerful lord who asked for the hand of Brynhild, daughter of Grim Hairy-Cheek. She went with him. Their son was Vémund, father of a son Vedrorm and a daughter Brynhild. Vedrorm fled King Harald Fairhair to Jamtaland (the modern Jämtland County in Sweden) and cleared the forest to live there and was father of a son Holmfast. Holmfast and his cousin Grím son of Brynhild are also mentioned in the Landnámabók (4.2).

Freygard ruled Fjörd (Fjǫrðr) and Fjalir, that is the western part of the modern county Sogn og Fjordane. Freygard was father of Freystein the Old (Freysteinn gamli) who had land at Gaular and was also father of Freybjörn (Freybjǫrn), father of Audbjörn (Auðbjǫrn) father of Arinbjörn (Arinbjǫrn) Jarl of Fird.

Thórgard ruled South Mœr (Sunnmœrr), the modern Sunnmøre district in the county Møre og Romsdal. Thórgard was father of Thorvid (Thorviðr) father of Arnvid (Arnviðr) Tréserkjabana, father of Slævid (Slæviðr) and Brávid (Bráviðr).

Grjótgard ruled North Mœr (Norðmœrr), the modern Nordmøre district in the county Møre og Romsdal. Grjótgard was father of Salgard (Salgarðr), father of Grjótgard, father of Sölvi (Sǫlvi), father of Högni of Njardey, father of a son, Sölvi Víking, and a daughter, Hild the Slender, the same Hild the Slender who married Hjörleif the Ladies' Man and was mother of Hálf as described in the previous section. (Högni, Sölvi, and Hild all play important parts in Hálfs saga ok Hálfsrekka.)

Högni of Njardey is mentioned also in the Ynglinga saga as the father of Sölvi who for a time ruled Sweden. Since Sölvi in Hálfs saga appears eventually as king of Sweden, the two are obviously intended to be the same. But chronologically that is impossible unless either the genealogies in the Ynglinga saga or those of Hálf's lineage are incorrect or defective (or both are incorrect).

The Hversu notes further that another son of Grjótgard was Sigar (Sigarr), father of a daughter Signýjar who married Jarl Harald of Naumu Dale who fathered on her Herlaug, father of Grjótgard, father of Jarl Hákon, father of Jarl Sigurd, father of Jarl Hákon of Hlada. (These last three were contemporaries to and supporters of King Harald Fairhair. Indeed, one of Harald's wives was Ása the daughter of Jarl Hákon son of Grjótgard. However the Herlaug who was king of Naumu Dale according to the account in Harald Fairhair's saga in the Heimskringla could certainly not be Jarl Hákon's grandfather.)

== Commentary ==
The word garðr means 'an enclosed piece of land' and is cognate with English yard and garth. The element garðr is commonly an element in place names such as Asgard, Midgard, Micklegard (a common Norse name for Constantinople), Holmgard (a common Norse name for Novgorod), and so forth. So, though Garðr does appear as a man's name, it is possible that Garðr Agði is in origin a personification of the Land of Agdir, and that his sons whose names end in -gard (-garðr) are similar personifications of other regions of Norway, euhemerized into first kings of those regions.

Thrym is otherwise known only as the name of a giant. See Thrym.

== Alternative spellings ==
Alternative Anglicizations are: Æsa: Aesa ; Agdir: Agthir ; Árinbjörn: Arinbjorn ; Ása: Asa ; Brávid: Bravid ; Espihól: Espihol ; Fjörd: Fjord ; Freybjörn: Freybjorn ; Grjótgard: Grjotgard, Grjótgarth, Grjotgarth ; Hagný: Hagny ; Hákon: Hakon ; Hálf: Half ; Hámund: Hamund ; Hjör: Hjor ; Hjörleif: Hjorleif ; Hjörólf: Hjorolf ; Högni: Hogni ; Hörd: Hord ; Hördaland: Horthaland ; Jöfur: Jofur ; Jösur: Josur ; Njardey: Njarthey, Naeroy ; Óblaud: Oblaud ; Ögvald: Ogvald ; Ótrygg: Otrygg ; Rögnvald: Roganvald ; Rúgálf: Rugalf ; Sigurd: Sigurth ; Signýjar: Signyjar ; Slævid: Slaevid ; Sölvi: Solvi ; Thórgard: Thorgard ; Úlf: Ulf ; Végard: Vegard.
