= Bronys Savukynas =

Lithuanian philologist, linguist, culturologist, translator, journalist, editor

Bronys Savukynas (December 16, 1929 – April 20, 2008) was a Lithuanian philologist, linguist, culturologist, translator, journalist, editor.

He was buried in the Antakalnis Cemetery.

In 2010 the Bronys Savukynas Prize for journalists was established by the Lithuanian Ministry of Culture and the Lithuanian PEN Center.

== Books ==
- Vardai ir žodžiai, Vilnius, 1971.
- Kalba ir mintis, Vilnius, 1980.
- Mintis ir ženklas, Vilnius, 1983.
- Žmonės ir kalba, Vilnius, 1977.
- Žodžiai ir žmonės, Vilnius, 1974.
- Ženklai ir prasmės, Vilnius, 1987.
- Lietuvių vardų kilmės žodynas, with Kazimieras Kuzavinis, Vilnius, 1987, 2006.

== Awards ==
- 2005: Officer's Cross of the Order of the Grand Duke Gediminas
- 2007:Culture and Art Prize of the Government of the Republic of Lithuania
- 2010: badge of honor "Carry your light and believe" of the Lithuanian Ministry of Culture (posthumously)
