= Þrívaldi =

Norse mythology character

In Norse mythology, Þrívaldi (anglicized as Thrívaldi or Thrivaldi), whose name means "thrice mighty", is a jötunn killed by Thor.

This fact is mentioned by Snorri Sturluson in the Skáldskaparmál (4), according to which "killer of Þrívaldi" ("vegandi Þrívalda") is a kenning for Thor. Snorri quotes one stanza by Bragi Boddason, who calls Thor "cleaver apart of Þrívaldi's nine heads" ("sundrkljúfr níu höfða Þrívalda"), and another stanza by Vetrliði Sumarliðason who praises Thor for having battered ("lemja") Þrívaldi.

Þrívaldi is also listed in the þulur.
