= Hálfs saga ok Hálfsrekka =

Legendary saga composed in the early 14th century

Hálfs saga ok Hálfsrekka (The Saga of Half & His Heroes) or Hálfssaga is a legendary saga composed in the early 14th century, based on a legend that has also been preserved in the Scandinavian medieval ballad Stolt Herr Alf. It is about Halfr (Proto-Norse: Haþuwolafr, meaning "battle-wulf") who was one of Norway's most famous legendary sea-kings.

His champions had to submit to harsh rules. When Half had spent 18 years of free-booting, he returned to Hordaland, where Half's stepfather Asmund had ruled in his stead. Asmund invited Halfr and half of his warband to a banquet and swore Halfr his loyalty. However, Asmund put them to the sword or burnt them to death inside his hall. Only two warriors survived and managed to escape, Utsten and Hrok the Black.

Utsten and Hrok united with Sölve of Njardey and they avenged Half and the slain warriors. Then they appointed Half's son Hjor to be the king of Hordaland.

It is known for its great diversity in content, ranging from folklore to heroic poetry. Some of the poetry is of considerable age suggesting a long time of oral transmission prior to its being put to paper. One of his champions is also mentioned in Hyndluljóð (Instein).
