= Geirmund Hjørson Heljarskinn =

9th-century Icelandic viking

Geirmund Hjørson, called Heljarskinn, was a leading Icelander of the late ninth century. He was the son of a Norwegian king and a Samoyed woman. His nickname, an apparent reference to his complexion, means "Hel skin", which indicates either dark or "black" skin or perhaps skin "pale as death".

The sources for Geirmund's life are the Landnámabók and the Geirmundar þáttr heljarskinns, the first saga in the Sturlunga saga collection. According to these, he inherited his father's kingdom in Rogaland but upon returning from a raid on Britain Harald fairhair had seized his land and saw he no other option than to depart. In Iceland, he held four large estates and travelled with a bodyguard of eighty men. His lifestyle was supported by the wealth from his raids and could not be sustained off of his estates alone.

== Bibliography ==
- Byock, Jesse L. (1982). Feud in the Icelandic Saga. University of California Press.
- McTurk, Rory (1997). "Marie de France, Geirmundar þáttr heljarskinns, and Reader-response Criticism". In Claude Lecouteux; Olivier Gouchet (eds.). Hugur: Mélanges d'histoire, de littérature et de mythologie offerts à Régis Boyer pour son 65^{e} anniversaire. Presses de l'Université de Paris-Sorbonne. pp. 193–209. ISBN 2-84050-089-2.
- Mitchell, Stephen A. (1987). "The Sagaman and Oral Literature: The Icelandic Traditions of Hjorleifr inn kvensami and Geirmundr heljarskinn". In John Miles Foley (ed.). Comparative Research on Oral Traditions: A Memorial for Milman Parry. Slavica Publishers. pp. 395–423. ISBN 9780893571733.
- Price, Neil (2020). The Children of Ash and Elm: A History of the Vikings. Allen Lane. ISBN 9780241283981.
