= Fornjót =

Norse mythical character

- Texts: Ynglingatal, Skáldskaparmál, Orkneyinga saga, Hversu Noregr byggdist

Genealogy
- Children: Hlér, Logi, Kári

Fornjót (Old Norse: Fornjótr) is a jötunn in Norse mythology, and the father of personified natural forces: Hlér ('sea'), Logi ('fire') and Kári ('wind'). He is also portrayed as the ancestor of the royal dynasty of Ynglings, ruling over the mythic northern lands of Finnland ("land of the Sámi") and Kvenland. The principal study of this figure is by Margaret Clunies Ross.

== Name ==
The etymology of the Old Norse name Fornjótr remains unclear. It is often interpreted as forn-jótr ('ancient or primordial jötunn'), or as for-njótr ('original owner', or 'destroyer'). Alternative meanings such as Forn-njótr ('one-who-enjoys-sacrifices') or Forn-þjótr ('ancient screamer') have also been proposed.

According to Peter Erasmus Müller (1818), Fornjótr could be interpreted as the "original owner" (primus occupans vel utens) of Norway.

An Old English cognate of Fornjótr may appear in a plant-name attested in the Cleopatra Glossary (as forneotes folm) and in Bald's Leechbook as fornetes folm. Folm means 'hand, palm', and, lacking a better explanation, scholars have suggested that fornetes is an Old English form of the name Fornjótr, such that the plant's name meant 'Fornet's palm'. The plant denoted by this name has not been certainly identified, but Peter Bierbaumer argued for a species of marsh-orchid (Dactylorhiza), partly on account of the supposed similarity of their tubers to hands.

== Attestations ==
=== Eddas ===
Þjóðólfr of Hvinir, a Norwegian skald of the late 9th–early 10th century AD cited in Ynglinga tal (29), apparently uses the kenning "son of Fornjót" as a synonym of 'fire', and another skald only known under the name Svein appears to use the kenning "ugly sons of Fornjót" to mean the 'wind'.

How should the wind be periphrased? Thus: call it son of Fornjót, Brother of the Sea and of Fire, Scathe or Ruin or Hound or Wolf of the Wood or of the Sail or of the Rigging.

Thus spake Svein in the Nordrsetu-drápa:

First began to fly
Fornjót's sons ill-shapen.

In the þulur, Fornjót is also included in a list of jötnar.

=== Sagas ===
In the Orkneyinga saga and in Hversu Noregr byggdisk (How Norway Was Settled), Fornjót is portrayed as a king ruling over Gotland and Jutland, "which is called Finnland (the land of the Sámi) and Kvenland [the Finnish-settled part of northern Norway]". Some editors alter "Gotland" or "Jutland" to "that land". In those two sources, Fornjót has three sons: Logi ('fire'), Kári ('wind'), and Hlér ('sea'), "whom we call Ægir" according to Fundinn Noregr.

== Descendants ==
Fornjótr appears as an ancestor-figure of the kings of Norway in several sources. Here follows two family trees of Fornjótr's descendants. The first is the genealogy as depicted in Hversu Noregr byggðist. The second is one possible rendering of a mythic Yngling family tree based on Historia Norwegiæ, Ynglinga saga, Beowulf and other Old Norse sources, some of which name Fornjótr; the names of Swedish kings in this second family tree are shown in bold.

The Ættartala (genealogy) of Fornjótr according to Hversu Noregr byggðist

Kings are in bold.

♂ Fornjótr
KEY
♂ Hlér (sea)	♂ Logi (fire)	♂ Kári (wind)	Marriage or coupling
Parent and child
♂ Jökul
♂ **Eystein**	♂ **Snær**
♂ Svaða, a jötunn	♀ Áshilda	♂ **Þorri**	♀ Fönn	♀ Drífa	♀ Mjöll
♂ **Nórr**	♀ Hödda	♂ **Górr**	♂ **Hrolf**	♀ Gói
descendants of Nórr	descendants of Górr

Ynglings

(♂Yngvi) (Note: In most sources Yngvi is presented as the same figure as Freyr, the son of Njǫrðr. His position as the father of Njǫrðr should not be seen as certain.)	♂Fornjótr
♂**Njǫrðr**	♀(Nerthus) (Note: Nerthus is often suggested to be the same woman as Njǫrðr's unidentified sister, by whom he begat Freyr and Freyja.)	♀Aurboða	♂Gymir (Note: The Lokasenna and the Skáldskaparmál identify Gymir with Fornjot’s son Ægir, but Rudolf Simek contests this. (Simek (1993:151).))	♂Kári	♂Logi
♀Freyja	♂**(Yngvi-)Freyr**	♀Gerðr	♂Frosti
♂Loki	♀Sigyn	♂**Fjǫlnir**	♂Snær
♂Narfi (Note: Assuming Narfi (son of Loki) is identical with Narfi.)	♂**Sveigðir**	♀Vana
♀Nótt	♂Naglfari	♂**Vanlandi**	♀Drífa
♂Auðr hinn ríki
♂Rígr	♀unidentified	♂**Vísburr**	♀unidentified
♂Danpr	♂Gísl	♂Ǫndurr	♂**Dómaldi**
♂Danr	♀Drótt	♂**Dómarr**
♂**Dyggvi**
♂**Dagr spaki**
♂**Agni**	♀Skjǫlf
♂**Alrekr**	♂**Eiríkr**
♀Bera	♂**Alfr**	♂**Yngvi**	♀Þornbjǫrg (Note: Þornbjǫrg appears in Gautreks saga and in Hrólfs saga Gautrekssonar.)
♂**Hugleikr**	♂**Jǫrundr**	♂Eiríkr	♀Ingiborg (Note: Ingeborg appears in the Tyrfing Cycle, e.g. Orvar-Odd's saga and Hervarar saga.)
♂**Aunn hinn gamli**
♂nine sons	♂**Egill Vendilkráka**
♂Helgi	♂**Áli** (Note: Áli's inclusion here is based on Beowulf, the oldest source.)	♂**Óttarr**
♀Yrsa	♂**Aðils**	♂Aunmundr (Note: Eanmund is only attested in Beowulf.)
♂Hrólfr kraki	♂**Eysteinn**	♂Gauti
♂**Ingvarr**	♂Óláfr hinn skyggni	♂Gautrekr
♂Óláfr	♂Sigvarðr	♂**Ǫnundr**	♀unidentified	♂Algautr
♂Halfdan gulltǫnn	♂**Ingjaldr**	♀Gauthildr
♂Eysteinn	♀Sǫlveig	♂Óláfr trételgja	♀Ása
♀Ása	♂Halfdan hvítbeinn	♂Ingjaldr Óláfssonr	♂Eiríkr Agnarssonr
♂Guðrøðr	♂Eysteinn Halfdanarsonr	♀Hildr	♂Dagr
♂Haraldr	♂Halfdan hinn mildi	♀Líf	♂Alfarinn
♂Gyrðr	♀Ása	♂Guðrøðr hinn gǫfugláti	♀Alfhildr
♂Halfdan svarti	♂Óláfr Geirstaðaalfr
♂Haraldr hárfagri	♂Ragnvaldr heiðumhár
