= List of legendary kings of Sweden =

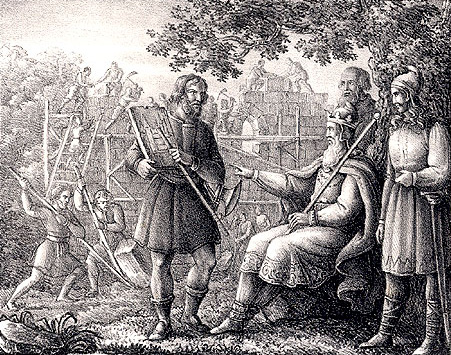
"Yngvi-Frey builds the Uppsala temple" (1830) by Hugo Hamilton. Yngvi-Frey is a legendary Swedish king of the Yngling dynasty, according to the sagas the grandson of Odin and the founder of Uppsala.

The legendary kings of Sweden (Swedish: sagokonungar, sagokungar, lit. 'saga kings / fairy tale kings') according to legends were rulers of Sweden and the Swedes who preceded Eric the Victorious and Olof Skötkonung, the earliest reliably attested Swedish kings. The stories of some of these kings may be embellished tales of local rulers or chiefs that actually existed. For example, Hygelac (500 A.D.) is believed to have historical basis due to his name being attested in Frankish, English, Danish and Icelandic sources. But the historicity of most legendary kings remains impossible to verify due to a lack of sources. The modern Swedish monarchy considers Eric the Victorious to have been the first King of Sweden.

In medieval Swedish lists of kings, the figure generally represented as the first king of Sweden is Olof Skötkonung, the first Christian king of Sweden and the first Swedish king to mint coins. The earlier kings are for the most part only attested in Icelandic sagas, sometimes contradictory mixtures of myths and poetry, written in the 11th–13th centuries, several centuries after the events described in them. What is genuine history and what is myth and legend in the sagas is impossible to determine today, and everything contained in them must as such be regarded as legendary, if not fictional. The earliest legendary dynasty, the Ynglings, may be an entirely invented sequence of kings, serving to justify and legitimize the later dynasties and rulers in Scandinavia who claimed descent from them. Many of the legendary kings would have ruled during the Migration Period (c. 375–550) and subsequent Vendel Period (c. 550–790), but larger political structures in Scandinavia (i. e. the medieval kingdoms of Sweden, Norway and Denmark) are not believed to have formed and centralized until the Viking Age.

The legendary kings of Sweden, as presented in the sagas, covers three legendary dynasties of rulers; the Yngling dynasty, claimed to have been descended from the Norse god Odin, the dynasty founded by Ivar Vidfamne, who conquered Sweden and deposed the Ynglings, and the House of Munsö, which succeeded Vidfamne's dynasty. The final few kings considered part of the Munsö dynasty by the Icelandic sagas; Eric the Victorious, Olof Skötkonung, Anund Jacob and Emund the Old, were real historical kings, though that does not mean that their legendary ancestors were real historical figures. Contemporary primary sources from 9th–11th century Germany, such as the accounts of Adam of Bremen and Rimbert, contradict the line of Munsö kings purported to have existed by the sagas.

== Yngling dynasty ==
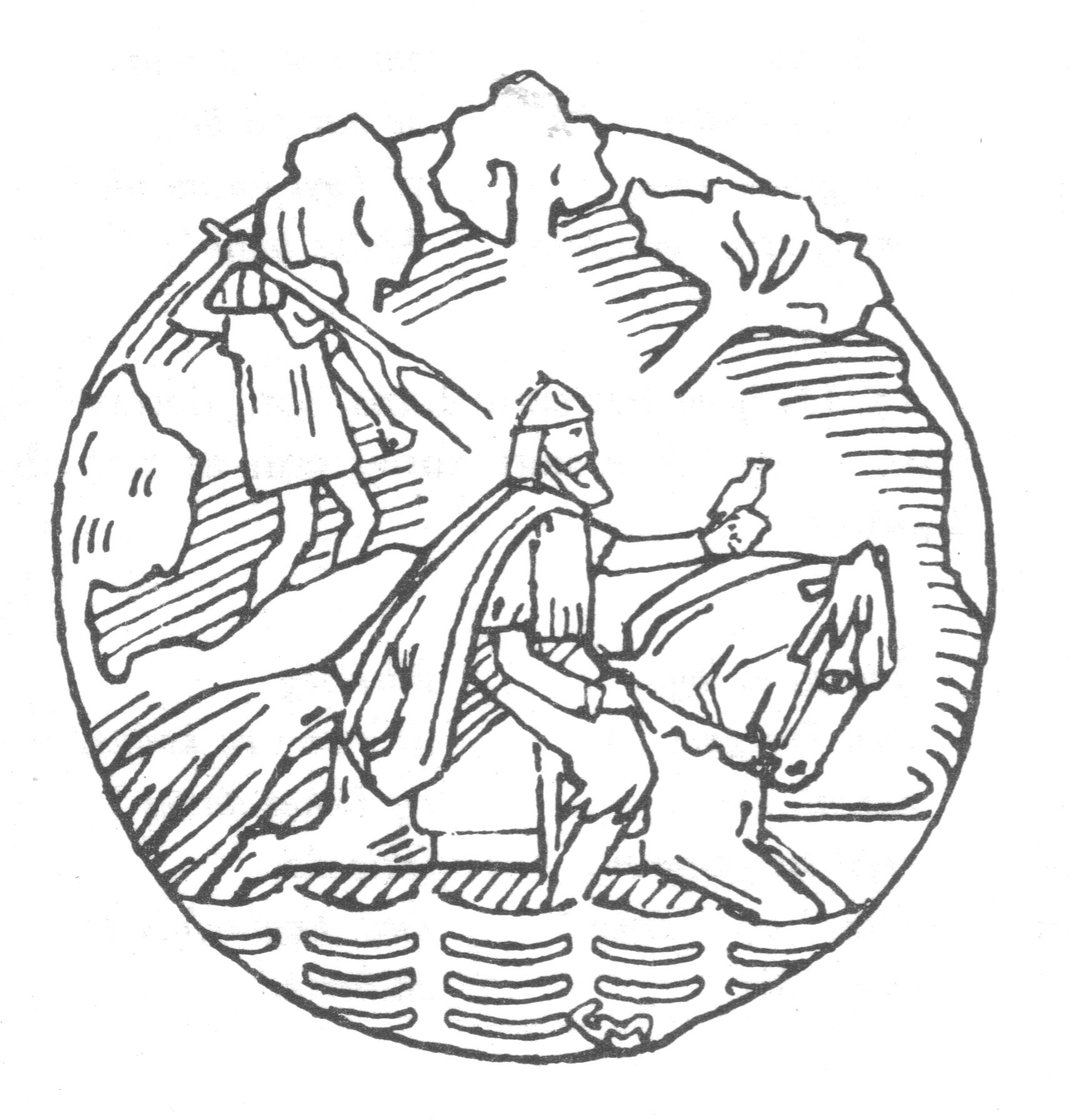
Dag the Wise, illustration by Gerhard Munthe (1899)

The sequence of legendary kings below derives from medieval Icelandic poet and historian Snorri Sturluson's Ynglinga saga, the first section of the saga collection Heimskringla. The Ynglinga saga was composed by Sturluson c. 1230 and details the reigns and lives of the kings of the Yngling dynasty (Swedish: Ynglingar), a legendary line of kings said to descend from the Norse god Odin. The Ynglings are described in the Ynglinga saga as the first royal blood line of the Swedes.

The Ynglinga saga contains no references to chronology (such as specific dates of the reigns of the various kings) with the exception of presenting the rulers in chronological order. In some places, names appear (notably kings Ottar and Adils) that might belong to people also attested in other sagas, such as Beowulf (written in the 10th–11th century in England, but concerning events in Scandinavia in the 6th/7th century), wherein the Ynglings are called Scylfings (Old Norse: Skilfingar; Swedish: Skilvingar). According to the Ynglinga saga, the earliest rulers used the title drotin (modern Swedish: Drott). Even later Yngling rulers are typically not designated as "Kings of Sweden" or "Kings of the Swedes" in the Ynglinga saga, most of them being described as "Kings in Uppsala", an early political center in Sweden. The Yngling dynasty is sometimes referred to as the "Royal House of Uppsala" in later scholarship.

=== Sequence of kings ===
Ynglings

(♂Yngvi) (Note: In most sources Yngvi is presented as the same figure as Freyr, the son of Njǫrðr. His position as the father of Njǫrðr should not be seen as certain.)	♂Fornjótr
♂Njǫrðr	♀(Nerthus) (Note: Nerthus is often suggested to be the same woman as Njǫrðr's unidentified sister, by whom he begat Freyr and Freyja.)	♀Aurboða	♂Gymir (Note: The Lokasenna and the Skáldskaparmál identify Gymir with Fornjot’s son Ægir, but Rudolf Simek contests this. (Simek (1993:151).))	♂Kári	♂Logi
♀Freyja	♂(Yngvi-)Freyr	♀Gerðr	♂Frosti
♂Loki	♀Sigyn	♂Fjǫlnir	♂Snær
♂Narfi (Note: Assuming Narfi (son of Loki) is identical with Narfi.)	♂Sveigðir	♀Vana
♀Nótt	♂Naglfari	♂Vanlandi	♀Drífa
♂Auðr hinn ríki
♂Rígr	♀unidentified	♂Vísburr	♀unidentified
♂Danpr	♂Gísl	♂Ǫndurr	♂Dómaldi
♂Danr	♀Drótt	♂Dómarr
♂Dyggvi
♂Dagr spaki
♂Agni	♀Skjǫlf
♂Alrekr	♂Eiríkr
♀Bera	♂Alfr	♂Yngvi	♀Þornbjǫrg (Note: Þornbjǫrg appears in Gautreks saga and in Hrólfs saga Gautrekssonar.)
♂Hugleikr	♂Jǫrundr	♂Eiríkr	♀Ingiborg (Note: Ingeborg appears in the Tyrfing Cycle, e.g. Orvar-Odd's saga and Hervarar saga.)
♂Aunn hinn gamli
♂nine sons	♂Egill Vendilkráka
♂Helgi	♂Áli (Note: Áli's inclusion here is based on Beowulf, the oldest source.)	♂Óttarr
♀Yrsa	♂Aðils	♂Aunmundr (Note: Eanmund is only attested in Beowulf.)
♂Hrólfr kraki	♂Eysteinn	♂Gauti
♂Ingvarr	♂Óláfr hinn skyggni	♂Gautrekr
♂Óláfr	♂Sigvarðr	♂Ǫnundr	♀unidentified	♂Algautr
♂Halfdan gulltǫnn	♂Ingjaldr	♀Gauthildr
♂Eysteinn	♀Sǫlveig	♂Óláfr trételgja	♀Ása
♀Ása	♂Halfdan hvítbeinn	♂Ingjaldr Óláfssonr	♂Eiríkr Agnarssonr
♂Guðrøðr	♂Eysteinn Halfdanarsonr	♀Hildr	♂Dagr
♂Haraldr	♂Halfdan hinn mildi	♀Líf	♂Alfarinn
♂Gyrðr	♀Ása	♂Guðrøðr hinn gǫfugláti	♀Alfhildr
♂Halfdan svarti	♂Óláfr Geirstaðaalfr
♂Haraldr hárfagri	♂Ragnvaldr heiðumhár

Notes

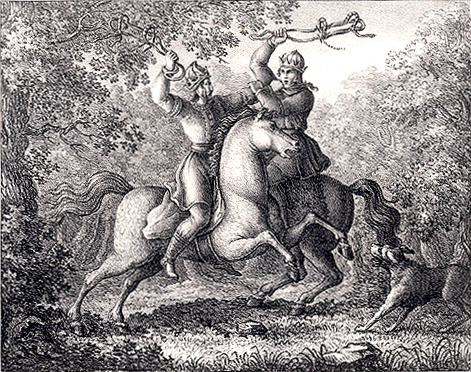
"Alaric and Eric kill each other with their bridle bits" (1830) by Hugo Hamilton

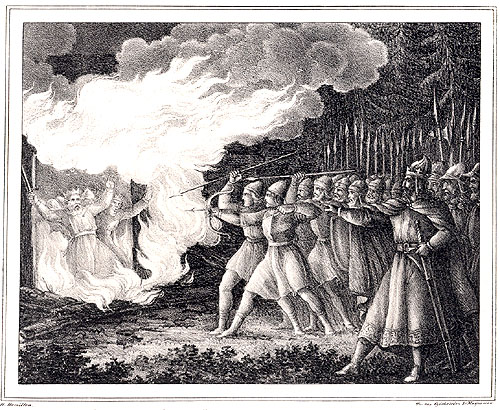
"King Ingjald Illready burns six petty kings" (1830) by Hugo Hamilton

The Ynglinga saga presents the following line of Yngling kings of the Swedes:

- Odin the Old (Old Norse: Óðinn; Swedish: Oden) – founder of the royal line; identified with the Norse mythological figure of the same name.
- Njord the Rich (Old Norse: Njörðr; Swedish: Njord, Njärd) – son and successor of Odin; identified with the Norse mythological figure of the same name.
- Yngvi-Frey (Old Norse: Yngvi-Freyr; Swedish: Yngve-Frej, Yngve Frö, Frö) – son and successor of Njord; identified with the Norse mythological figure of the same name. Described as the founder of the subsequent Viking age political centre Gamla Uppsala. The Yngling dynasty takes its name from him.
- Fjölnir (Old Norse: Fjölnir; Swedish: Fjölner, Fjölne) – son and successor of Yngvi-Frey.
- Sveigder (Old Norse: Sveigðir; Swedish: Svegder, Svegde) – son and successor of Fjölnir.
- Vanlande (Old Norse: Vanlandi; Swedish: Vanlande, Vanland) – son and successor of Sveigder.
- Visbur (Old Norse: Vísburr; Swedish: Visbur, Visburr) – son and successor of Vanlande.
- Domalde (Old Norse: Dómaldi, Dómaldr; Swedish: Domalde) – son and successor of Visbur.
- Domar (Old Norse: Dómarr; Swedish: Domar) – son and successor of Domalde.
- Dyggvi (Old Norse: Dyggvi; Swedish: Dyggve, Dygve) – son and successor of Domar.
- Dag the Wise (Old Norse: Dagr Spaka; Swedish: Dag den vise) – son and successor of Dyggvi.
- Agne Skjálfarbondi (Old Norse: Agni Skjálfarbondi; Swedish: Agne Skjalfarbonde) – son and successor of Dag.
- Alaric (Old Norse: Alrekr; Swedish: Alrik, Alrek) and Eric (Old Norse: Eiríkr; Swedish: Erik) – sons and co-successors of Agne.
- Yngvi (Old Norse: Yngvi; Swedish: Yngve) and Alf (Old Norse: Álfr; Swedish: Alf) – sons of Alaric; co-successors of Alaric and Eric.
- Hugleik (Old Norse: Hugleikr; Swedish: Hugleik, Huglek) – son of Alf; successor of Yngvi and Alf.
  - Haki (Old Norse: Haki; Swedish: Hake Hednasson) – Danish sea-king who conquered Sweden, usurpring the throne from Hugleik.
- Jorund (Old Norse: Jörundr; Swedish: Jorund, Jörund, Järund, Eorund) – son of Yngvi and cousin of Hugleik; retook the throne from Haki.
- Aun the Old (Old Norse: Aun hinn gamli; Swedish: Aun, Ane, Ön, On, One) – son and successor of Jorund.
  - Halfdan (Old Norse: Halfdan; Swedish: Halfdan, Halvdan) – legendary Danish king of the Scylding dynasty; supposedly conquered Uppsala from Aun and ruled there as king for twenty years before dying of natural causes, whereupon Aun was reinstated as king.
  - Ale the Strong (Old Norse: Ale; Swedish: Ale, Åle) – legendary Danish king of the Scylding dynasty; conquered Uppsala from Aun and ruled there as king for twenty-five years before being killed by legendary champion Starkad, whereupon Aun was reinstated as king.
- Egil Tunnadolg (Old Norse: Egill Tunnudólgr; Swedish: Egil Tunnadolg, Angantyr) – son and successor of Aun.
- Ottar Vendelcrow (Old Norse: Ótarr vendilkráka; Swedish: Ottar Vendelkråka) – son and successor of Egil.
- Eadgils the Mighty (Old Norse: Aðils; Swedish: Adils) – son and successor of Ottar.
- Eysteinn (Old Norse: Eysteinn; Swedish: Östen, Eystein) – son and successor of Eadgils.
  - Sölve (Old Norse: Sölve; Swedish: Sölve Högnesson, Salve) – Danish or Geatish sea-king who conquered Sweden, usurping the throne from Eysteinn.
- Ingvar Harra (Old Norse: Yngvari; Swedish: Yngvar Harra, Ingvar) – son of Eysteinn, proclaimed king after the Swedes turned on Sölve and murdered him.
- Anund (Old Norse: Brautönundr, Anundr; Swedish: Bröt-Anund, Bryt-Önund) – son and successor of Ingvar.
- Ingjald Illready (Old Norse: Ingjaldr hinn illráði; Swedish: Ingjald illråde, Ingjald illråda) – son and successor of Anund. According to the Ynglinga saga the last of the Swedish Yngling kings as Sweden was conquered by Scanian king Ivar Vidfamne. Ingjald's son, Olof Trätälja, became ancestral to the later kings of Norway of the Fairhair dynasty.

=== Historicity ===
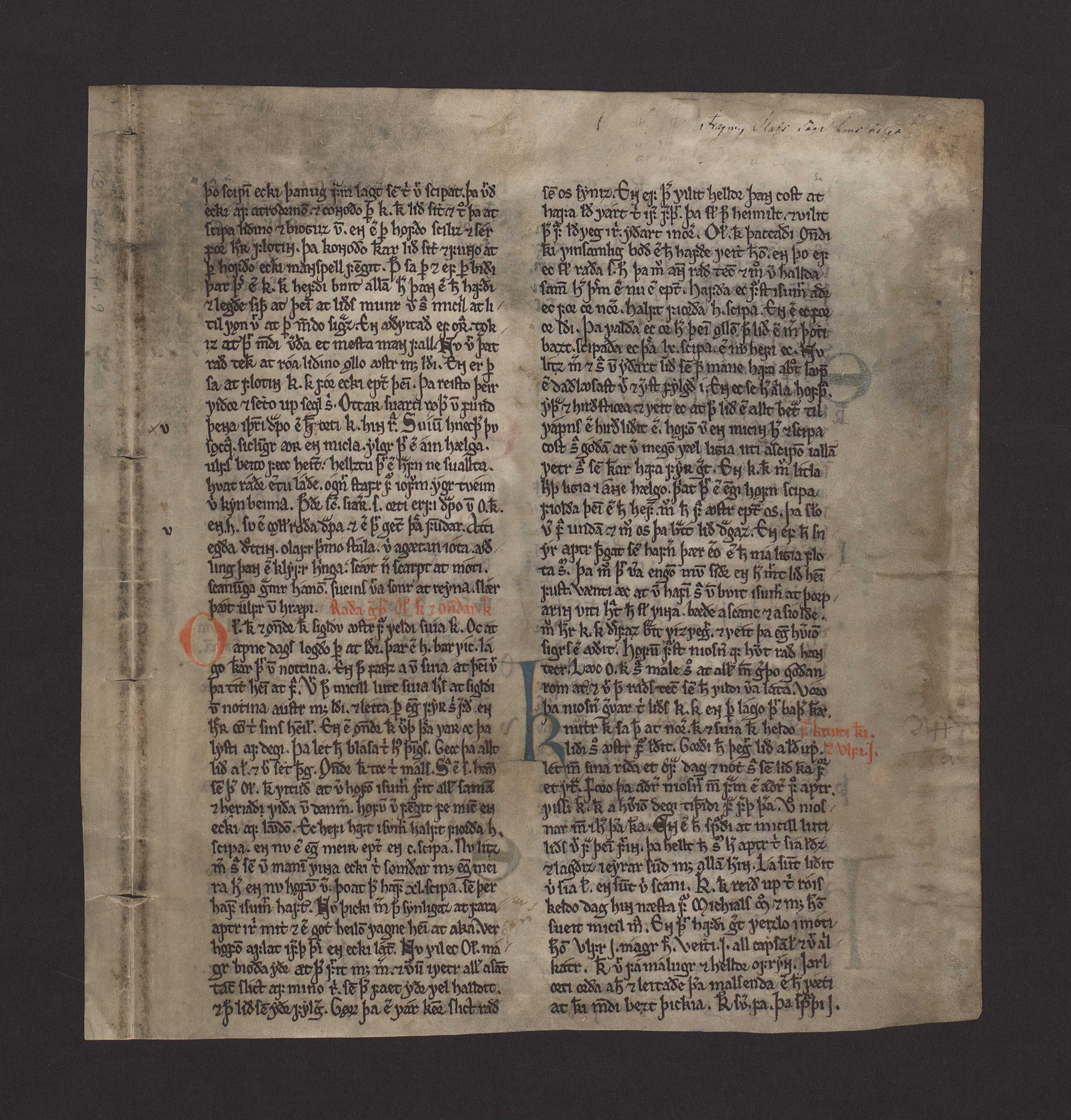
A surviving page of the Heimskringla

Sturluson's Ynglinga saga was created far too late to serve as a reliable source in regards to the events and kings it describes, being separated from the earliest ones by several centuries. Ynglinga saga appears to have been based on an earlier scaldic poem, Ynglingatal, which is quoted at length by Snorri. Ynglingatal is not a reliable source either, though traditionally believed to have been composed at the end of the 9th or beginning of the 10th century, it might be from as late as the 12th century. Sturluson would have had access to older (now lost) manuscripts when writing the Ynglinga saga, but this does not necessarily corroborate anything that appears in the Ynglinga saga as true. What is genuine history and what is myth and legend is today impossible to determine, and everything contained in the saga must as such be regarded as legendary, if not fictional. Modern scholarship does not see sagas such as the Ynglinga saga as good sources for genuine historical information. As a historical source, the Ynglinga saga is much better used as a source on historiography and society during Sturluson's own time than as a source on Sweden's early history.

It is possible that the Yngling line of kings is entirely fictional, invented by later Norwegian rulers to assert their right to rule Norway. In the Viking Age and later, Danish rulers repeatedly attempted to conquer Norway and through inventing a lineage that stretched back centuries, the Norwegian rulers may have attempted to demonstrate their inherent right to their lands and to put themselves on the same level as the Danes, who had historical accounts of their ancestors. The Swedish Ynglings might have been invented to glorify the Norwegian kings further, giving them a glorious and mythical past associated with Uppsala. Most of the sagas known today, the Ynglinga saga included, were composed during a relatively brief period, from the 12th to 13th century, a time when royal power was being consolidated in Norway, Denmark and Sweden. Their creation might thus stem from political and social needs (i. e. justifying the rule of a dynasty), rather than a desire to tell genuine history.

In addition to having been written centuries after the events they describe, the sagas have numerous other problems which make them unsuitable to use as sources. Many of the elements of the Ynglinga saga appear to be based on later, documented, events and people in Scandinavia. For instance, the figure of Aun, described as being driven from Uppsala and taking up court in Västergötland instead, is similar to the historical Swedish king Inge the Elder (r. c. 1079–1084, 1087–1105), who was driven from Uppsala into Västergötland in the 11th century. The Ynglinga saga might also be an example of anti-royal social commentary rather than an attempt to tell history. Many of the kings in the saga are overshadowed by their contemporary vassals and wives, and they are rarely shown in a positive light. The inglorious deaths of many of the Swedish Ynglings; with examples such as murder, burning to death, drowning in mead and being "hag-ridden" to death, might be an attempt by Sturluson to say that the kings who ruled Norway in his time and claimed Yngling descent were not to be taken seriously. Though descent from figures such as Odin and Njord, gods in Norse mythology, might seem a prestigious origin, it would be problematic in early medieval Norway since the kings were Christian and their ancestors were worshipped as Pagan gods. Their addition to the saga might thus have been another attempt by Sturluson to undermine royal ideology.

If some of the Ynglings were real historical figures, they would have ruled during the Migration Period (c. 375–550) and the subsequent Vendel Period (c. 550–790), predating the Viking Age. Historical evidence of early geopolitics in Scandinavia suggests that larger political structures, kingdoms such as medieval Sweden, Norway and Denmark, did not form until the late Viking Age. The centralization of power under one monarch is believed to have resulted from, or at the very least have been connected to, Viking expansion, with petty kings increasing their power through aggressive military ventures directed both to foreign lands (i. e. Viking raids) and against their neighbors.

== Vidfamne dynasty ==
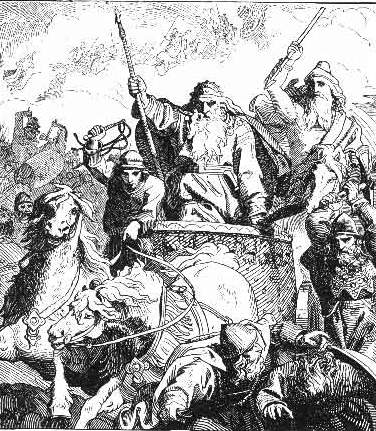
Harald Wartooth at the Battle of Bråvalla by Lorenz Frølich (19th century)

According to the Ynglinga saga, the Yngling dynasty's rule in Sweden was succeeded by Ivar Vidfamne, previously a petty king in Scania, who founded a new royal line.

=== Sequence of kings ===
The sequence of kings presented below is given by the Hervarar saga, a saga written in the 12th or 13th century.

- Ivar Vidfamne (Old Norse: Ívarr inn víðfaðmi; Swedish: Ivar Vidfamne) – founder of the dynasty, deposed the Yngling dynasty.
- Harald Wartooth (Old Norse: Haraldr hilditǫnn; Swedish: Harald Hildetand) – son of Randver, Ivar's vassal king in Denmark, and Alfhild, the daughter of Ivar. Took control over most of Ivar's former empire.
- Eysteinn Beli (Old Norse: Eysteinn hinn illráði; Swedish: Östen Illråde, Östen Beli) – son of Harald Wartooth, inherited Sweden. He ruled until Sweden was conquered by the Danish or Swedish Viking Ragnar Lodbrok (who in some other sagas is said to be the son of a previous Swedish or Danish king, Sigurd Ring).

=== Historicity ===
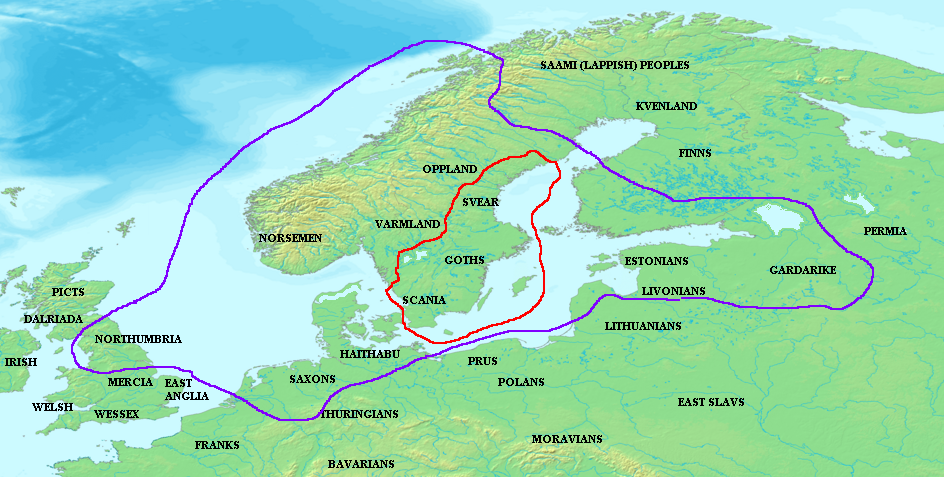
Map of Ivar Vidfamne's 7th-century empire according to the sagas. Since he is only mentioned in the Icelandic sagas, an empire of this extent is highly unlikely to have existed.

The existence of Ivar Vidfamne and his dynasty, at least in the way described in the sagas, is considered highly unlikely in modern scholarship. As with the Yngling kings, precise dates are not presented in the sagas for Ivar Vidfamne or his descendants, but his reign is estimated to have taken place in the 7th century. The only sources that mention Ivar are Icelandic sagas from centuries after his death. As Ivar is described as building a vast empire, including parts of Britain and northern Germany, it is unlikely that contemporary and later writers in Europe would not have written of him, had he existed. It is possible that the saga preserves a grain of the truth, perhaps being an embellishment of vague memories of an ancient warrior king, but most of what is said of Ivar Vidfamne has to be considered legendary and fictional.

== Munsö dynasty ==
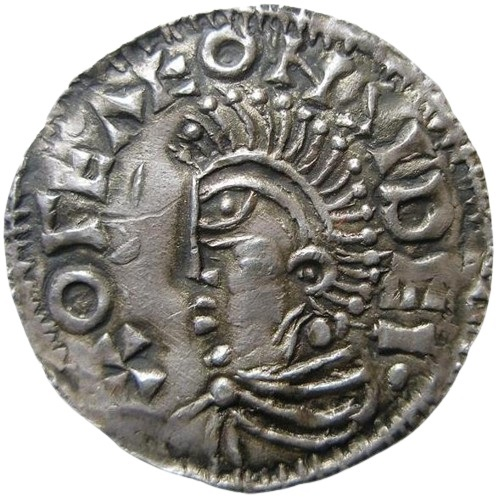
Coin of Olof Skötkonung, an early historical Swedish king (r. c. 995–1022), claimed by Icelandic sagas to be a late member of an older dynasty founded by legendary Viking Ragnar Lodbrok

The Munsö dynasty of kings is the earliest royal lineage that is mentioned not only in Icelandic sagas, but also in medieval Swedish sources. Though only a few examples survive, medieval Swedish lists of kings overwhelmingly begin with Olof Skötkonung, the first Christian king of Sweden, suggesting that he, and not any of the previous legendary figures, was seen as Sweden's first king. In Icelandic sources, such as the 12th/13th-century Langfeðgatal, Olof Skötkonung is regarded as a late ruler of a significantly older dynasty, stretching back to legendary Viking hero Ragnar Lodbrok. In addition to the short genealogical account of Langfeðgatal, Ragnar Lodbrok's royal dynasty is also presented in a more narrative form in the aforementioned Hervarar saga, also written in the 12th or 13th century.

=== Sequence of kings ===
Langfeðgatal presents the following line of kings:

- Ragnar Lodbrok (Old Norse: Ragnarr Loðbrók; Swedish: Ragnar Lodbrok) – earliest king mentioned in Langfeðgatal. Conquered Sweden from Eysteinn Beli according to the Hervarar saga.
- Björn Ironside (Old Norse: Bjǫrn Járnsíða; Swedish: Björn Järnsida) – son and successor of Ragnar Lodbrok.
- Eric Björnsson (Old Norse: Eiríkr; Swedish: Erik) – son and successor of Björn Ironside.
- Eric Refilsson (Old Norse: Eiríkr; Swedish: Erik) – son of Refil, a son of Björn Ironside, and successor of Eric Björnsson.
- Anund Uppsale (Old Norse: Anundr Uppsali; Swedish: Anund Uppsale) and Björn at Haugi (Old Norse: Bjǫrn; Swedish: Björn på Högen) – sons of Eric Björnsson and co-successors of Eric Refilsson.
- Eric Anundsson (Old Norse: Eiríkr; Swedish: Erik) – son and successor of Anund Uppsale.
- Björn Eriksson (Old Norse: Bjǫrn; Swedish: Björn) – son and successor of Eric Anundsson.
- Eric the Victorious (Old Norse: Eiríkr inn sigrsæli; Swedish: Erik Segersäll) and Olof Björnsson (Old Norse: Óláfr; Swedish: Olof) – both sons and co-successors of Björn Eriksson. Eric the Victorious is a real historical king, r. c. 970–995.
- Olof Skötkonung (Old Norse: Óláfr skautkonungr; Swedish: Olof Skötkonung) – real historical king, r. c. 995–1022, son of Eric the Victorious.
- Anund Jacob (Swedish: Anund Jakob) – real historical king, r. c. 1022–1050, son of Olof Skötkonung.
- Emund the Old (Swedish: Emund den gamle) – real historical king, r. c. 1050–1060, illegitimate son of Olof Skötkonung.

=== Historicity ===
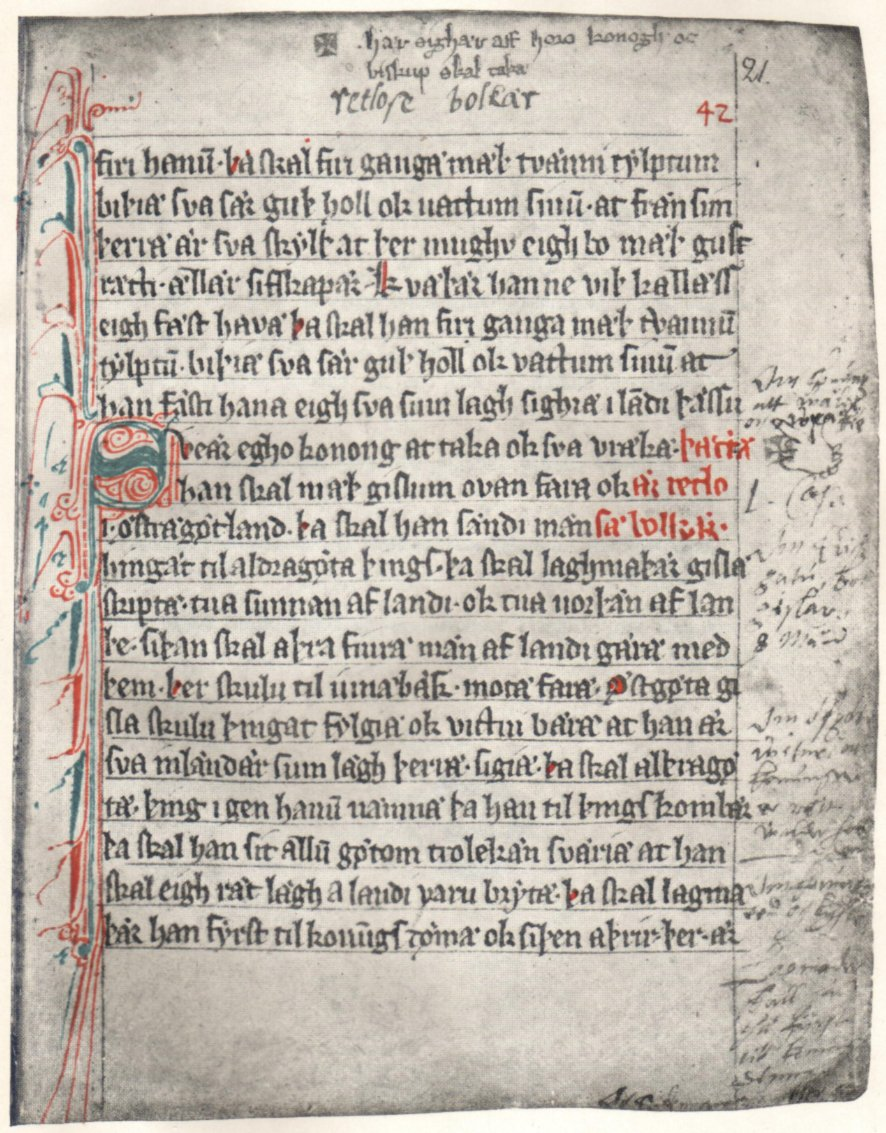
A page of the medieval Swedish Västgötalagen. Västgötalagen lists Olof Skötkonung (r. c. 995–1022) as the first King of Sweden

The Langfeðgatal reconstruction of the Munsö dynasty and the later lineage of Swedish kings it presents does not conform with medieval Swedish primary sources. Though a majority of the kings from Olof Skötkonung onwards appear in the Icelandic sources with the same name and overall chronology, the Icelandic sources also contain the figure Blot-Sweyn, who is only present in some of the Swedish sources (and notably absent in Västgötalagen, an important early Swedish legal document) and a king by the name Kol or Erik Årsäll, completely absent in the Swedish sources. The same is true for the Hervarar saga, whose sequence of kings is identical to the sequence presented in Langfeðgatal. In some respects, the royal sequence is more correct in the Langfeðgatal; Swedish medieval sources tend to omit the kings Anund Jacob and Emund the Old, who can be verified through foreign documents and through the coins they minted, and where the Swedish sources present kings as successive, some (such as Inge the Elder) are known to have co-ruled with others, which is accurately presented in the Icelandic versions.

The missionary Ansgar travelled to Sweden several times during the 9th century in an attempt to Christianize the Swedes. In the writings of his companion Rimbert, the Vita Ansgari, several Swedish kings (who all precede Eric the Victorious) and who they met or heard of at Birka, an important Viking Age trading center, are mentioned. Attempts have been made to harmonize Ansgar's kings with the kings mentioned in the sagas but such attempts have to be considered unreliable and unverifiable. The Vita gives no genealogical information in regards to the kings. It mentions the following four kings:

- Björn, who reigned c. 829 when Ansgar first visited Sweden. Björn was reportedly friendly to the missionaries but chose not to convert to Christianity (although one of his chief councilors, Hergeir, did).
- Anund, who is not mentioned as ruling at Birka (possibly ruling somewhere else in Sweden), having been driven from Sweden and taken refuge among the Danes. Anund promised Birka to the Danes as a reward for helping him gain revenge and attacked Birka c. 840. As Birka continues to be ruled by Swedish kings, it is unlikely that the attack succeeded.
- Eric (Erik), who was recently deceased by the time Ansgar visited Sweden for the second time c. 852. According to Rimbert's writings, some of the Anti-Christian Swedes suggested that Eric be worshipped as a god alongside the rest of the Nordic pantheon instead of the new Christian god.
- Olof (Olaf, Olef), who reigned c. 852, during Ansgar's second visit to Sweden, having then only recently come to the throne.

In terms of sources on Viking Age kings, Adam of Bremen, who worked in the 11th century and wrote of Swedish kings, is significantly closer in time and place to the kings he describe than the centuries of separation in the sagas, only being separated from the mentioned rulers by at most about 150–100 years. The Icelandic sources are substantially different from his work, not only in the kings preceding Olof Skötkonung. As the successors of King Stenkil (r. c. 1060–1066), the Icelandic sources give Håkan the Red, followed by a co-regency of Inge the Elder, Halsten and Blot-Sweyn. Adam of Bremen instead gives a more linear succession of Eric and Eric, followed by Halsten, Anund Gårdske and then Håkan the Red. As the direct predecessors of Eric the Victorious, Icelandic sources give Björn Eriksson, preceded by Erik Anundsson. Apart from the kings found in the Vita Asgari, Adam writes that Eric the Victorious was preceded by Anund/Emund Eriksson, who in turn was preceded by Eric Ringsson and Emund/Anund Ringsson, sons and successors of a king by the name of Ring. Adam of Bremen's line of kings is thus:

- Ring, reigning in the early 10th century.
- Eric Ringsson, son of Ring, reigning in the 10th century.
- Emund Ringsson, son of Ring, reigning in the 10th century, possibly together with Eric.
- Emund Eriksson, son of Eric and successor of Emund, reigning possibly c. 975.

The Sparlösa Runestone, created c. 800, mentions several names, including the name Alríkr (Alaric) in an unclear context, the name Eiríkr (Eric) in reference to a king at Uppsala and the name Eyvísl as the son of this Eiríkr. No written source mentions a king by the name Eyvísl, though the context of the stone does not make it clear whether he ruled as king or whether he was simply a prince.

== See also ==
- List of legendary kings of Denmark
- List of legendary kings of Norway
- Sögubrot af nokkrum fornkonungum
- Germanic Heroic Age
- King of the Geats
- Historia de omnibus Gothorum Sueonumque regibus
