= Yngling =

Mythological Swedish and Norwegian royal dynasty

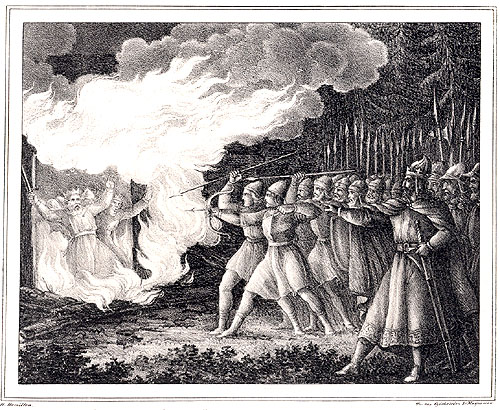
The Yngling Ingjald slaying his kinsmen.

The Ynglings were a dynasty of kings, first in Sweden and later in Norway, primarily attested through the poem Ynglingatal. The dynasty also appears as Scylfings (Old English: Scylfingas, Old Norse: Skilfingar) in Beowulf and Ynglingatal. When Beowulf and Ynglingatal were composed sometime in the eighth to tenth centuries, their respective authors (scops and skalds) expected their audience to have a great deal of background information about these kings, which is shown in the allusiveness of the references.

According to sources such as Ynglingatal and Íslendingabók, the Fairhair dynasty in Oppland, Norway was in fact a branch of the Ynglings (here Yngling is explicitly used as the name of the dynasty). Saxo Grammaticus held that the Ynglings also included Eric the Victorious, who is usually the first king in modern regnal lists, and his descendants. However, this does not tally with Icelandic sources.

The dynasty claimed descent from the gods Freyr and Njörðr, and other kings were likely mythical as well, whereas others may have been real: especially Egil, Ottar, Ale and Adils that are mentioned in Beowulf as well as Nordic sources.

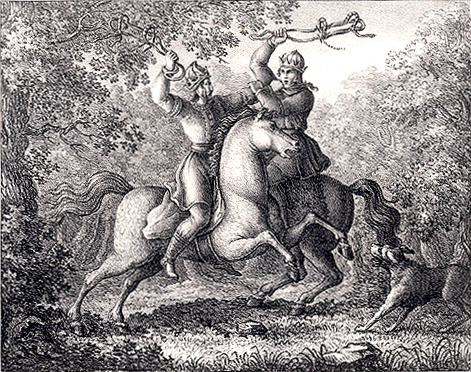
Alrek and Eirík fighting.

== Names ==
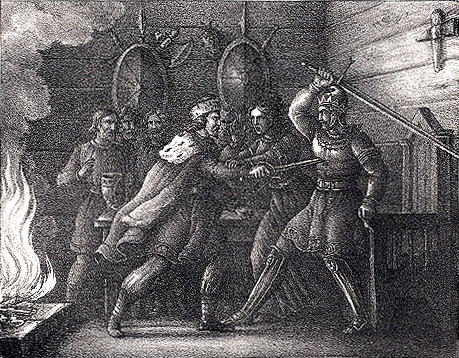
Yngvi and Alf slaying each other.

In the Scandinavian sources they are the descendants of Yngvi-Frey of Vanaheim. Yngling means descendant of Frey, and in the Gesta Danorum of Saxo Grammaticus they are called the sons of Frey. Several of these kings appear in Beowulf: Eadgils (Adils), Onela (Ale), and Ohthere (Ottar Vendelkråka), but here they are called Scylfings (see the Beowulf section below).

In his Skáldskaparmál the 13th-century Icelandic writer Snorri Sturluson hints at a less divine origin for this dynasty: One war-king was named Skelfir; and his house is called the House of Skilfings: his kindred is in the Eastern Land. In Ynglinga Saga, Snorri discusses marriages between Swedish and Finnish royal families. In the Skáldskaparmál section of Edda, he discusses King Halfdan the Old, Nór's great-grandson, and nine of his sons who are the forefathers of various royal lineages, including "Yngvi, from whom the Ynglings are descended".

According to the Orkneyinga Saga, Nór founded Norway. He was a direct descendant of Fornjótr, the King of "Gotland, Kvenland and Finnland". In traditional Scandinavian lineages we find Halfdan the Old as the Great-grandfather of Ragnvald Eysteinson Jarl of Møre, the father of Rollo, called Gengu-Hrolf in Norse sources, the Viking conqueror who founded Normandy, who Dudo of Saint-Quentin testifies took the name Robert after converting to Christianity. He is also known as Count Rou of Rouen, and is said to have been William the Conqueror's great-great-great-grandfather.

Hversu Noregr byggðist ('How Norway was founded') is a 14th-century account of the origin of various legendary Norwegian lineages. It too traces the descendants of the primeval Finnish ruler Fornjotr back through Nór and his siblings, Góí and Gór; Nór being here the eponym and first great king of Norway, and then gives details of the descendants of Nór and of his brother Gór in the following section known as the Ættartölur ('Genealogies', a.k.a. Fundinn Noregr, 'Founding of Norway'). The Hversu account is closely paralleled by the opening of the Orkneyinga saga.

The 'genealogies' also claim that many heroic families famed in Scandinavian tradition but not located in Norway were of a Finn-Kven stock, mostly sprung from Nór's great-grandson Halfdan the Old. Almost all the lineages sprung from Halfdan are then shown to reconvert in the person of Harald Fairhair, the first king of "all Norway". This information can be confirmed in other sources.

The 'Ættartölur' account ends to a genealogy of Harald's royal descendants down to Olaf IV of Norway with the statement that the account was written in 1387, and with a list of the kings of Norway from this Olaf back to Harald Fair-hair.

Another origin for the name skilfing is possible: Snorri described Erik and Alrik, the sons of Skjalf to be the de facto ancestors of this Norse clan.

The kings who resided at Upsal had been the supreme chiefs over the whole Swedish dominions until the death of Agne, when, as before related, the kingdom came to be divided between brothers (Alrek and Erik). After that time the dominions and kingly powers were spread among the branches of the family as these increased; but some kings cleared great tracts of forest-land, and settled them, and thereby increased their domains.

== From Sweden to Norway ==
According to Snorri Sturluson, the dynasty led the settlement of the Swedish provinces and established themselves as the kings of its provinces, accepting the overlordship of the Swedish king at Uppsala, until the dynasty all but exterminated itself with Ingjald Ill-Ruler and his downfall. A survivor Olof Trätälja was the ancestor of the Norwegian branch.

== Remaining in Sweden ==
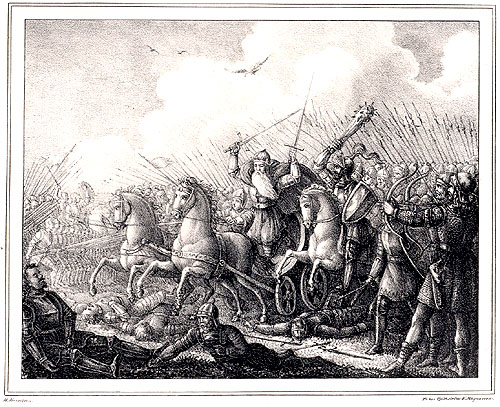
The Battle of Bråvalla.

However, both Snorri (as in the earlier quote) and Saxo described the clan as remaining in Sweden after this date.

Saxo on the Battle of Bråvalla (ca 750):

Now the bravest of the Swedes were these: Arwakki, Keklu-Karl (Kelke-Karl), Krok the Peasant, (from Akr), Gudfast and Gummi from Gislamark. These were kindred of the god Frey, and most faithful witnesses to the gods. Ingi (Yngwe) also, and Oly, Alver, Folki, all sons of Elrik (Alrek), embraced the service of Sigurd Hring; they were men ready of hand, quick in counsel, and very close friends of Ring. They likewise held the god Frey to be the founder of their race. Amongst these from the town of Sigtun (Old Sigtuna) also came Sigmund, a champion advocate, versed in making contracts of sale and purchase; besides him Frosti surnamed Bowl: allied with him was Alf the Lofty (Erect?spear-thrower?) from the district of Upsala (Old Uppsala); this man was a swift spear-thrower, and used to go in the front of the battle.

Moreover, both in Icelandic sources and in the Gesta Danorum, King Sigurd Hring would become the ancestor of the houses of Ragnar Lodbrok and would thus be the semi-legendary ancestor of the House of Munsö through Björn Ironside, and the Danish royal house through Sigurd Snake-in-the-Eye. Ragnar's eldest son Ivar the Boneless was the leader of the Great Heathen Army and appears to have been the founder of the Uí Ímair dynasty of the Kingdom of York and Kingdom of Dublin, and by extension the Crovan Dynasty of the Kings of Mann.

== The line ==
Beowulf 8th–10th c.	Ynglingatal Late 9th c.	Íslendingabók* Early 12th c.	Historia Norvegiæ Late 12th c.	Ynglinga saga c. 1225	Hversu Noregr byggðist 1387
					Burri
					Burr
					Óðinn Ásakonungr
		Yngvi Tyrkjakonungr	Ingui		Freyr
		Njörðr Svíakonungr	Neorth	Njörðr	Njörðr
		Freyr	Froyr	Yngvifreyr	Freyr
	Fjǫlnir	Fjölnir	Fiolnir	Fjölnir	Fjölnir
	Sveigðir	Svegðir	Swegthir	Svegðir	Sveigðir
	Vanlandi	Vanlandi	Wanlanda	Vanlandi	Vanlandi
	Vísburr	Visburr	Wisbur	Vísburr	Vísburr
	Dómaldi	Dómaldr	Domald	Dómaldi	Dómaldi
	Dómarr	Dómarr	Domar	Dómarr	Dómarr
	Dyggvi	Dyggvi	Dyggui	Dyggvi	Dyggvi/Tryggvi
	Dagr spaki	Dagr	Dagr	Dagr spaki	Dagr
	Agni	Alrekr	Alricr	Agni	Agni Skjálfarbóndi
	Alrekr and Eiríkr	Agni	Hogni	Alrekr and Eiríkr	Alrekr
	Yngvi and Alfr	Yngvi	Ingialdr	Yngvi and Álfr	Yngvi
	Jǫrundr	Jörundr	Jorundr	Jörundr and Eiríkr	Jörmunfróði/Jörundr
	Aunn	Aun inn gamli	Auchun	Aun hinn gamli	Aunn inn gamli
Ongenþeow	Egill	Egill Vendilkráka	Eigil Vendilcraca	Egill Tunnudólgr	Egill Tunnadólgr
Ohthere and Onela	Óttarr	Óttarr	Ottarus	Óttarr Vendilkráka	Óttarr Vendilskráka
Eadgils and Eanmund	Aðils	Aðísl at Uppsölum	Adils/Athisl	Aðils	Aðils at Uppsölum
	Eysteinn	Eysteinn	Eustein	Eysteinn	Eysteinn
	Yngvarr	Yngvarr	Ynguar	Yngvarr	Yngvarr inn hári
	Ǫnundr	Braut-Önundr	Broutonundr	Brautönundr	Braut-Önundr
	Ingjaldr	Ingjaldr inn illráði	Ingialdr	Ingjaldr hinn illráði	Ingjaldr inn illráði
	Ólafr	Óláfs trételgju Svíakonungs	Olavus tretelgia	Óláfr trételgja	Ólafr trételgja
	Halfdan	Hálfdan hvítbeinn Upplendingakonungr	Halfdan hwitbein	Hálfdan hvítbeinn	Hálfdan hvítbeinn
	Eysteinn	Goðröðr	Eustein	Eysteinn	Eysteinn
	Halfdan	Óláfr	Halfdan	Hálfdan hinn mildi	Hálfdan inn mildi
	Guðrøðr	Helgi	Guthrodr	Guðröðr veiðikonungr	Guðröðr veiðikonungr
	Ólafr	Ingjaldr, [grandson of] Sigurðar, Ragnarssonar loðbrókar	Halfdan Niger	Ólafr	Hálfdan svarti
	Rǫgnvaldr heiðumhôr	Óleifr inn hvíti	Haraldus	Rögnvaldr heiðum hæra	Haraldr inn hárfagri
		Þorsteinn inn rauði			
		Óleifr feilan			
		Þórðr gellir			
		Eyjólfr			
		Þorkell			
		Gellir			
		Þorkel			
		Brand			
		Þorgil			
		Ari Þorgilsson			

- Íslendingabók presents a line of descent between Olof Trätälja and Harald Fairhair identical to Ynglinga saga in its preface. When the closing chapter maps out a full line, it diverges after Halfdan Hvitbeinn.

== The family tree ==
This is the mythic Yngling family tree based on Historia Norwegiæ, Ynglinga saga, Beowulf and other Old Norse sources. The names of Swedish kings are shown in bold.

Ynglings

(♂Yngvi) (Note: In most sources Yngvi is presented as the same figure as Freyr, the son of Njǫrðr. His position as the father of Njǫrðr should not be seen as certain.)	♂Fornjótr
♂**Njǫrðr**	♀(Nerthus) (Note: Nerthus is often suggested to be the same woman as Njǫrðr's unidentified sister, by whom he begat Freyr and Freyja.)	♀Aurboða	♂Gymir (Note: The Lokasenna and the Skáldskaparmál identify Gymir with Fornjot’s son Ægir, but Rudolf Simek contests this. (Simek (1993:151).))	♂Kári	♂Logi
♀Freyja	♂**(Yngvi-)Freyr**	♀Gerðr	♂Frosti
♂Loki	♀Sigyn	♂**Fjǫlnir**	♂Snær
♂Narfi (Note: Assuming Narfi (son of Loki) is identical with Narfi.)	♂**Sveigðir**	♀Vana
♀Nótt	♂Naglfari	♂**Vanlandi**	♀Drífa
♂Auðr hinn ríki
♂Rígr	♀unidentified	♂**Vísburr**	♀unidentified
♂Danpr	♂Gísl	♂Ǫndurr	♂**Dómaldi**
♂Danr	♀Drótt	♂**Dómarr**
♂**Dyggvi**
♂**Dagr spaki**
♂**Agni**	♀Skjǫlf
♂**Alrekr**	♂**Eiríkr**
♀Bera	♂**Alfr**	♂**Yngvi**	♀Þornbjǫrg (Note: Þornbjǫrg appears in Gautreks saga and in Hrólfs saga Gautrekssonar.)
♂**Hugleikr**	♂**Jǫrundr**	♂Eiríkr	♀Ingiborg (Note: Ingeborg appears in the Tyrfing Cycle, e.g. Orvar-Odd's saga and Hervarar saga.)
♂**Aunn hinn gamli**
♂nine sons	♂**Egill Vendilkráka**
♂Helgi	♂**Áli** (Note: Áli's inclusion here is based on Beowulf, the oldest source.)	♂**Óttarr**
♀Yrsa	♂**Aðils**	♂Aunmundr (Note: Eanmund is only attested in Beowulf.)
♂Hrólfr kraki	♂**Eysteinn**	♂Gauti
♂**Ingvarr**	♂Óláfr hinn skyggni	♂Gautrekr
♂Óláfr	♂Sigvarðr	♂**Ǫnundr**	♀unidentified	♂Algautr
♂Halfdan gulltǫnn	♂**Ingjaldr**	♀Gauthildr
♂Eysteinn	♀Sǫlveig	♂Óláfr trételgja	♀Ása
♀Ása	♂Halfdan hvítbeinn	♂Ingjaldr Óláfssonr	♂Eiríkr Agnarssonr
♂Guðrøðr	♂Eysteinn Halfdanarsonr	♀Hildr	♂Dagr
♂Haraldr	♂Halfdan hinn mildi	♀Líf	♂Alfarinn
♂Gyrðr	♀Ása	♂Guðrøðr hinn gǫfugláti	♀Alfhildr
♂Halfdan svarti	♂Óláfr Geirstaðaalfr
♂Haraldr hárfagri	♂Ragnvaldr heiðumhár

== The name Scylfing ==
In Old English several kings who are generally identified as Ynglings are called Scylfings.

The genealogy is given as:

Ongentheow
Ohthere	Onela	Healfdene's daughter
Eadgils	Eanmund

Ohthere (Ottar) also occurs as the father of Aedgils (Adils) in Ynglingatal. There Skilfing (Skilfingr) appears as a synonym of Yngling, in a line on Egil, the father of Ottar, so that Ongentheow is considered identical to Egil.

Ok lofsæll ór landi fló Týs óttungr Tunna ríki, en flæming farra trjónu jötuns eykr á Agli rauð. Sás of austr áðan hafði brúna hörg of borinn lengi, en skíðlauss Skilfinga nið hœfis hjörr til hjarta stóð.	The fair-haired son of Odin's race, Who fled before fierce Tunne's face, Has perished by the demon-beast Who roams the forests of the East. The hero's breast met the full brunt Of the wild bull's shaggy front; The hero's heart's asunder torn By the fell Jotun's spear-like horn."(Laing's translation )

Likewise in the Skáldskaparmál the Scylfings are described as an eastern family and East King was a conventional kenning for a Swedish king.

However, in the Ættartolur, (the genealogies attached to Hversu Noregr byggdist), the Skilfings are of Norwegian origin and include a family identified as Skjöldungs. In the eddic poem Grímnismál (stanza 55), Skilfing appears as one of Odin's names, the information there also appearing in the Gylfaginning..

=== Beowulf ===
In the Old English poem Beowulf, the word Scylfing occurs twice in the singular and twice in the plural. For alliterative purposes the name could be extended, such as the form Heathoscylfing 'Battle-Scylfing', which occurs once in the singular and twice in the plural. A Scylfing whose name is partly missing but ends in -ela married the sister of Hrothgar and Halga. Specifically identified as Scylfings are Ongentheow, king of Sweden, and by extension his subject Wiglaf son of Weohstan. Wiglaf and Weohstan belonged to the family of the Wægmundings to which Beowulf and his father Ecgtheow also belonged. Another extended form is helm Scylfinga. This literally means 'Scylfings'-helmet'; it is a kenning meaning both "ruler of the Scylfings" and "protector of the Scylfings". The Beowulf poet uses it to refer to Ongentheow's son Onela.

=== In Norse tradition ===
==== From the Hyndluljóð ====
The eddic poem Hyndluljóð, in stanza 16 speaks of descendants of an ancient king named Halfdan the Old:

Hence come the Skjöldungs, hence the Skilfings,
Hence the Ödlings [Ǫðlingar], hence the Ylfings, ...

==== From the Skáldskaparmál ====
In the Skáldskaparmál, Snorri Sturluson speaks of the second group of nine sons of Halfdan the Old, from whom many families of legend descend, one of these sons being Yngvi, purported ancestor of the Yngling lineage. But neither Skylfings or Skjöldungs are specifically derived from these sons. Snorri continues with examples of famous descendants of three of those lineages, followed by: "Of the house of the Ylfings was Eirík the Eloquent (Eiríkr inn málspaki)." But Ylfings have not been previously mentioned. Then follows the names of four ancestors of four lineages not descended from Halfdan, which include Yngvi and the Ynglings a second time. There is obvious confusion or corruption in this passage or its source. The fourth lineage is identified:

One war-king was named Skelfir; and his house is called the House of Skilfings: his kindred is in the Eastern Region.

A connection with the east might mean a connection to Sweden, but the vagueness of expression suggests Snorri knows no more about these Skilfings than he has written.

Snorri also gives Skilfing as a kenning for "king" and it appears as a kenning for "sword" in the thulur found in some versions of the Skáldkskaparmál.

==== From the Ættartǫlur ====
The Ættartǫlur connected to Hversu Noregr byggdist are a longer variant of the genealogical passages in the Skáldskaparmál, also speaking of Halfdan the Old and lineages descended from him and of other notable lineages, but in much greater detail. In this list of the sons of Halfdan, Yngvi the ancestor of the Ynglings is missing and Skelfir the ancestor of the Skilfings appears in his place. This might be a remembrance of an earlier identity or connection of the Swedish Ynglings and the Swedish Scylfings in Beowulf. But nothing in the following genealogy is necessarily Swedish though possible Swedish parallels do appear, particular the names Alrek and Eirík as discussed below.

There are many oddities in this account.

It claims Skelfir was king of Vörs (Vǫrs), modern Voss in northern Hordaland in southwestern Norway, but Halfdan's inheritance was in southeastern Norway.

Skelfir was the father of Skjöld (Skjǫldr). The account ends by saying that lineage of Skelfir was called the Skilfing lineage or the Skjöldung lineage, seemingly identifying the two. But Skjöldungs are normally the legendary royal family of the rulers of Denmark and no connection with Denmark is made here. Indeed, the Ættartǫlur later twice gives a quite different list of descendants of the Danish Skjöld who is there made a son of Odin as commonly in Norse texts. Skjöld as son of Skelfir might be related to English traditions of Scyld being a son or descendant of Sceafa (as discussed under Sceafa), though here too (at least in Beowulf) the connection is to Danish matters, not to Norway.

This Norwegian Skjöld, ancestor of the Norwegian Skjöldungs, is father of Eirík, father of Alrek (Alrekr), father of Eirík the Eloquent, whom the Skáldskaparmál presented as an Ylfing. These two mentions are the only occurrences of Eirík the Eloquent in Norse texts. But what seems to be the same figure appears prominently in book 5 of Saxo Grammaticus' Gesta Danorum as Ericus disertus. This Ericus disertus is indeed a Norwegian, but his father is not named Alrek but rather Regnerus pugilex, that is Ragnar the Champion. The Gesta Danorum then somewhat forcibly identifies Ericus disertus with Eirík, a legendary king of Sweden, a king who in the Ynglinga saga and elsewhere has an elder brother (rather than a father) named Alrek. See Alrek and Eirík for details.

In the Ynglinga saga the mother of the Swedish kings Alrek and Eirík is named Skjálf, which might also be an eponym for Skilfing.

Returning to the Ættartǫlur, there Eirík the Eloquent is father of Alrek, father of Víkar (Víkarr), father of Vatnar. This Víkar is the famous Víkar, king of Hördaland, who was sacrificed to Odin by Starkad. The chain of descent from Alrek to Víkar to Vatnar is also found in Hálfs saga ok Hálfsrekka ('The saga of Hálf and his heroes'). However Gautreks saga gives an entirely different ancestry and different descendants to Víkar. See Víkar for details.

This genealogy may have been based on attempts to ascribe a Norwegian origin to both Swedish Scylfings and Danish Skjöldungs and also be related to Saxo's account of the Norwegian Ericus desertus. If so, as it stands, it has been edited to remove material that would obviously conflict with the standard genealogies of the Skjöldungs and Ynglings which also appear in the Ættartǫlur.

== See also ==
- Saxo's kings of Sweden
- Fairhair dynasty
