= Langfeðgatal =

12th-century Icelandic manuscript

Langfeðgatal (Old Norse pronunciation: [ˈlaŋɡˌfɛðɡaˌtʰal], Icelandic pronunciation: [ˈlauŋkˌfɛðkaˌtʰaːl̥]) is an anonymous, twelfth-century Icelandic genealogy of Scandinavian kings.

== Manuscript ==
Langfeðgatal is preserved in a manuscript that is part of the Arnamagnæan Manuscript Collection (AM 415), a body of medieval Scandinavian works collected by the late-seventeenth/early-eighteenth-century scholar and collector Árni Magnússon. The text was published, along with a Latin translation, in 1772 by Jacob Langbek in the first volume of Scriptores Rerum Danicarum Medii Ævi.

== Origins ==
Langfeðgatal falls within a group of medieval manuscripts that trace the Scandinavian and Anglo-Saxon royalty back to legendary and divine progenitors. Raymond Wilson Chambers suggested that it, together with the Anglian collection, the Ættartölur and the West Saxon Genealogical Regnal List were influenced by a common Anglo-Saxon archetypal genealogy that existed around 970 CE. The Langfeðgatal genealogies are split into two branches, a Norwegian line of legendary progenitors leading to King Harald Fairhair and a Danish line leading to Danish King, Horda-Knute. These lines converge on Óðinn, who takes the place of the Woden of the Anglo-Saxon royal genealogies. Though it then parallels the Anglo-Saxon pedigrees for several generations, but again diverges to trace a line that includes Thor, Priam of Troy, and Jupiter before connecting with the Generations of Noah via Japheth, Noah's son.

The exact relationship of the genealogies contained in Langfeðgatal to similar trees in other Scandinavian and Anglo-Saxon sources is unclear. Alexander M. Bruce suggested that Snorri Sturlson was in possession of the Langfeðgatal or a closely related text when he composed the detailed list of gods and heroes given in the Prologue to the Prose Edda. Anthony Faulkes suggested transmission in the opposite direction: a set of incomplete notes from the English Anglian collection manuscript T (or a closely related text) found their way to Iceland, and Faulkes sees Snorri's Prologue as an intermediate between these notes and the form of the mythical pedigrees take in Langfeðgatal.

== Other uses ==
The term langfeðgatal has also been used as a generic description of this type of genealogical text, tracing royal lineages back to Biblical and classical forebears, such as Adam, Noah or the Trojan King Priam, like what is found in the second appendix to Íslendingabók. This generic usage appears in Eyvind Fjeld Halvorsen's Kulturhistorisk leksikon for nordisk middelalder.
