= Domar =

Legendary King of Sweden

Legendary King of Sweden
- Predecessor: Domalde
- Successor: Dyggvi
- Died: Uppsala
- Burial: Fyrisvold
- Issue: Dyggvi
- Dynasty: House of Yngling
- Father: Domalde
- Religion: Norse Paganism

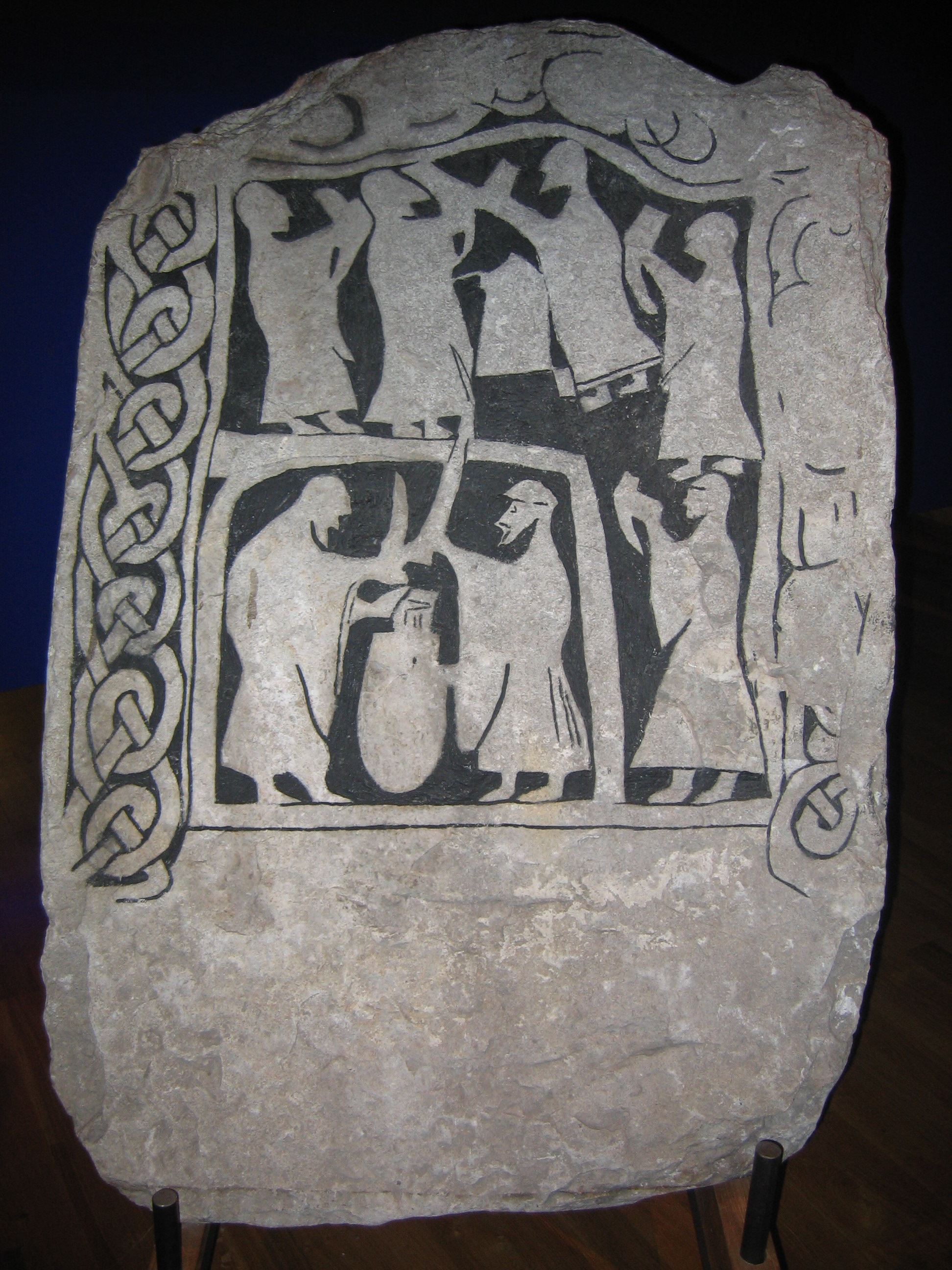
Drinking scene on an image stone.jpg

In Norse mythology, the Swedish king Domar (Old Norse Dómarr, "Judge") of the House of Ynglings was the son of Domalde. He was married to Drott, the sister of Dan the Arrogant who gave his names to the Danes. Drott and Dan are in this work said to be the children of Danp son of Ríg.

His rule lasted long and after the sacrifice of his father Domalde, the crops were plentiful and peace reigned. Consequently, there is not much to tell about his reign, and when he died at Uppsala, he was transported over the Fyris Wolds (Fyrisvellir) and burnt on the banks of the river, where a stone was raised over his ashes.

He was succeeded by his son Dyggvi.

== Attestations ==
Snorri Sturluson wrote of Domar in his Ynglinga saga (1225):

Dómarr hét sonr Dómalda, er þar næst réð ríki; hann réð lengi fyrir löndum, ok var þá góð árferð ok friðr um hans daga. Frá honum er ekki sagt annat, en hann varð sóttdauðr at Uppsölum, ok var fœrðr á Fyrisvöllu ok brendr þar á árbakkanum, ok eru þar bautasteinar hans.	Domald's son, called Domar, next ruled over the land. He reigned long, and in his days were good seasons and peace. Nothing is told of him but that he died in his bed in Upsal, and was transported to the Fyrisvold, where his body was burned on the river bank, and where his standing stone still remains.

The information about Domar's marriage appears after Snorri has presented Domar's son Dyggvi (Danish tongue refers to the Old Norse language as a whole and not only to the dialect of Denmark):

Móðir Dyggva var Drótt, dóttir Danps konungs, sonar Rígs, er fyrstr var konungr kallaðr á danska tungu; hans ættmenn höfðu ávalt síðan konungsnafn fyrir hit œzta tignarnafn. Dyggvi var fyrstr konungr kallaðr sinna ættmanna; en áðr váru þeir dróttnar kallaðir, en konur þeirra dróttningar, en drótt hirðsveitin. En Yngvi eða Ynguni var kallaðr hverr þeirra ættmanna alla ævi, en Ynglingar allir saman. Drótt dróttning var systir Dans konungs hins mikilláta, er Danmörk er við kend.	Dygve's mother was Drott, a daughter of King Danp, the son of Rig, who was first called "king" in the Danish tongue. His descendants always afterwards considered the title of king the title of highest dignity. Dygve was the first of his family to be called king, for his predecessors had been called "Drottnar", and their wives "Drottningar", and their court "Drott". Each of their race was called Yngve, or Yngune, and the whole race together Ynglinger. The Queen Drott was a sister of King Dan Mikillati, from whom Denmark a took its name.

As for Domar, Snorri included a piece from Ynglingatal (9th century):

Ok þess opt of Yngva hrör fróða menn of fregit hafðak, hvar Dómarr á dynjanda bana háalfs of borinn væri; nú þat veitk, at verkbitinn Fjölnis niðr við fýri brann.	I have asked wise men to tell Where Domar rests, and they knew well. Domar, on Fyrie's widespread ground, Was burned, and laid on Yngve's mound.

The Historia Norwegiæ presents a Latin summary of Ynglingatal, older than Snorri's quotation:

Iste [Domald] genuit Domar qui in Swethia obiit morbo. Hujus filius Dyggui [...]	Domalde begot Domar, who died in Sweden. Likewise Dyggve, his son, [...]

The even earlier source Íslendingabók cites the line of descent in Ynglingatal and also gives Dómarr as the successor of Dómaldr and the predecessor of Dyggvi: viii Dómaldr. ix Dómarr. x Dyggvi.

== Sources ==
- Ynglingatal
- Ynglinga saga (part of the Heimskringla)
- Historia Norwegiae

Domar House of Yngling
Preceded by Domalde	Mythological king of Sweden	Succeeded by Dyggvi
