= Dyggvi =

King in Norse mythology

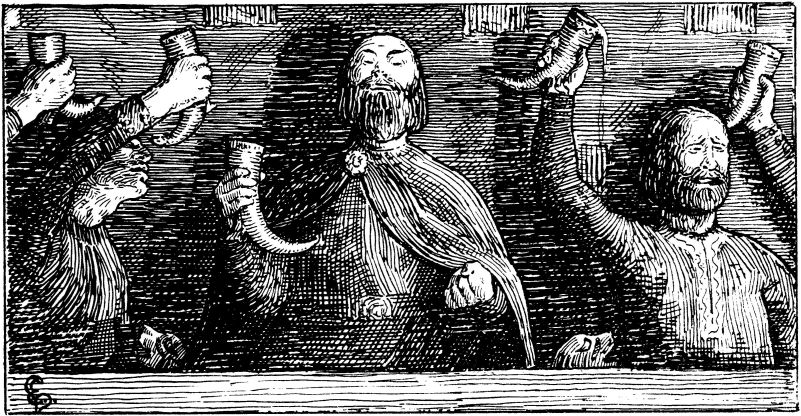

In Norse mythology, Dyggvi or Dyggve (Old Norse "Useful, Effective") was a Swedish king of the House of Ynglings, son of Domar. Dyggvi died and became the concubine of Hel, Loki's daughter. Dyggvi was succeeded by his son Dag the Wise. According to Snorri Sturluson, Dyggvi was the nephew of Dan, the eponymous ancestor of Denmark, through his sister Drott, and was the first to be called King by his family.

== Attestations ==
Snorri Sturluson wrote of Dygvvi's father Domar in his Ynglinga saga (1225):

Dyggvi hét son hans, er þar næst réð löndum, ok er frá honum ekki sagt annat, en hann varð sóttdauðr.

Dygve was the name of his son, who succeeded him in ruling the land; and about him nothing is said but that he died in his bed.

About Dyggvi's mother Snorri had more to say:

Móðir Dyggva var Drótt, dóttir Danps konungs, sonar Rígs, er fyrstr var konungr kallaðr á danska tungu; hans ættmenn höfðu ávalt síðan konungsnafn fyrir hit œzta tignarnafn. Dyggvi var fyrstr konungr kallaðr sinna ættmanna; en áðr váru þeir dróttnar kallaðir, en konur þeirra dróttningar, en drótt hirðsveitin. En Yngvi eða Ynguni var kallaðr hverr þeirra ættmanna alla ævi, en Ynglingar allir saman. Drótt dróttning var systir Dans konungs hins mikilláta, er Danmörk er við kend.

Dygve's mother was Drott, a daughter of King Danp, the son of Rig, who was first called "king" in the Danish tongue. His descendants always afterwards considered the title of king the title of highest dignity. Dygve was the first of his family to be called king, for his predecessors had been called "Drottnar", and their wives "Drottningar", and their court "Drott". Each of their race was called Yngve, or Yngune, and the whole race together Ynglinger. The Queen Drott was a sister of King Dan Mikillati, from whom Denmark took its name.

In his Ynglinga saga, Snorri Sturluson included a piece from Ynglingatal composed in the 9th century:

Kveðkat dul, nema Dyggva hrör Glitnis gná at gamni hefr, því at jódis Ulfs ok Narfa Konungmann kjósa skyldi; ok allvald Yngva þjóðar Loka mær of leikinn hefr.	Dygve the Brave, the mighty king, It is no hidden secret thing, Has gone to meet a royal mate, Riding upon the horse of Fate. For Loke's daughter in her house Of Yngve's race would have a spouse; Therefore the fell-one snatched away Brave Dygve from the light of day.

The Historia Norwegiæ presents a Latin summary of Ynglingatal, older than Snorri's quotation:

Hujus [Domar] filius Dyggui item in eadem regione vitæ metam invenit. Cui successit in regnum filius ejus Dagr [...]

Likewise Dyggve, his [Domar's] son, reached the limit of his life in that same region [Sweden]. His son Dag [...]

The even earlier source Íslendingabók also cites the line of descent in Ynglingatal and it also gives Dyggvi as the successor of Dómarr and the predecessor of Dagr: ix Dómarr. x Dyggvi. xi Dagr.

== Sources ==
- Ynglingatal
- Ynglinga saga (part of the Heimskringla)
- Historia Norwegiae

Dyggvi House of Yngling
Preceded by Domar	Mythological king of Sweden	Succeeded by Dag the Wise
