= Dag the Wise =

Mythological Swedish king

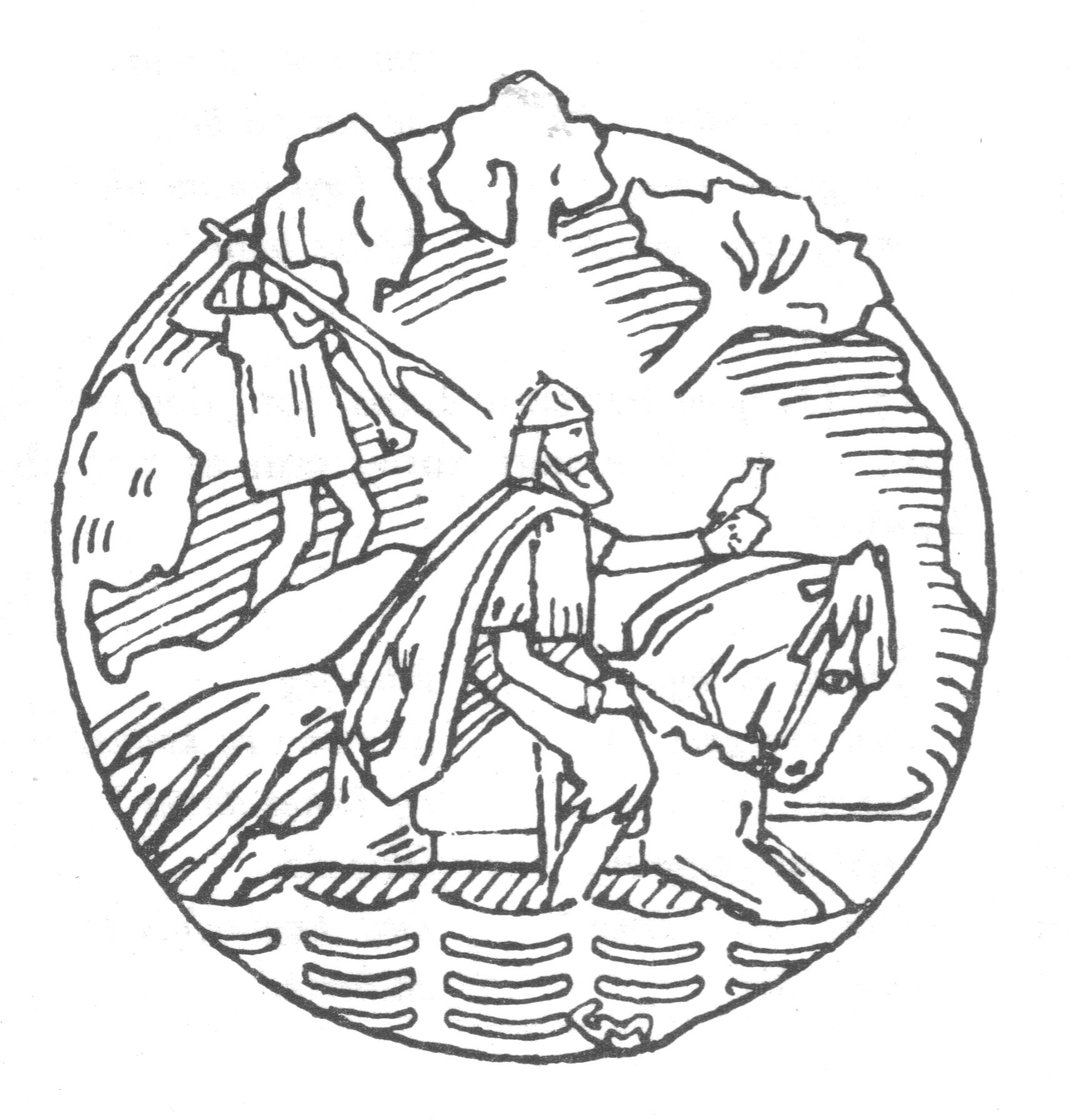
Illustration by Gerhard Munthe (1899)

Dag the Wise or Dagr spaki was a mythological Swedish king of the House of Ynglings (dated to the 4th century by 16th-century historiographer Johannes Magnus). He was the son of Dyggvi, the king before him. According to legend, he could understand the speech of birds and had a sparrow that gathered news for him from many lands. When the bird was killed on one of these trips, Dag invaded Reidgotaland (considering the date and location, apparently Gothiscandza), in order to avenge it. There he was ambushed by a thrall and killed.

== Sources ==
=== Ynglingatal ===
The earliest source for the legend is the 9th century Skaldic poem Ynglingatal, which survives in quotation in Snorri Sturluson's Ynglinga saga. Each stanza of the poem is devoted to one king belonging to the Yngling dynasty. Stanza 8 describes the death of Dag as he was impaled by a pitchfork:

Frák at Dagr
dauða orði
frægðar fúss
of fara skyldi,
þás valteins
til Vǫrva kom
spakfrǫmuðr
Spǫrs at hefna.
Ok þat orð
á austrvega
vísa ferð
frá vígi bar,
at þann gram
of geta skyldi
slǫnguþref
Sleipnis verðar.

Translation: ‘I learned that Dagr, eager for fame, had to depart by the word of death when the wise wielder of the twig of the slain [SWORD > WARRIOR] came to Vǫrvi to avenge Spǫrr. And the retinue of the leader bore the news from the fight to the east, that the flung grasper of the meal of Sleipnir <horse> [HAY > PITCHFORK] had to get that prince.’

=== Early prose sources ===
The earliest two prose sources based on Ynglingatal are the 12th century Historia Norwegiæ and Íslendingabók (see below). Both of these texts say that Dag was succeeded by his sons Alrekr and Eírikr who in their turn were succeeded by Dag's grandson Agne (in Historia Norwegiæ incorrectly called Hogne).

Historia Norwegiæ:

Cui [Dyggui] successit in regnum filius ejus Dagr, quem Dani in quodam vado, quod Sciotanvath vel Wapnavath dicitur, dum passeris injurias vindicare conaretur, publico bello occiderunt. Qui genuit Alrik; hunc frater suus Erikr freno percussit ad mortem. Alricr autem genuit Hogna

His [Dyggve's] son Dag succeeded to his throne; he was killed by the Danes in a royal battle at a ford named Skjotansvad, while he was trying to avenge the violence done to a sparrow. This man engendered Alrek, who was beaten to death with a bridle by his brother, Eirik. Alrek was father to Agne, [...]

Íslendingabók only lists the line of succession: x Dyggvi. xi Dagr. xii Alrekr. xiii Agni. xiiii Yngvi.

=== Ynglinga saga ===
However, in the 13th century Ynglinga saga, Snorri Sturluson gives Agne as Dag's son and successor, and the two brothers Alrekr and Eiríkr as his grandsons. This is reflected in his citation of stanzas 9–10 of Ynglingtal, but it is possible that his version of the poem had a different order of the relevant stanzas than the one employed by the earlier sources.

This is what Snorri tells of Dag:

Dagr hét son Dyggva konungs, er konungdóm tók eptir hann; hann var maðr svá spakr, at hann skildi fugls rödd. Hann átti spörr einn, er honum sagði mörg tíðindi; flaug hann á ymsi lönd. Þat var eitt sinn, at spörrinn flaug á Reiðgotaland, á bœ þann, er á Vörva heitir; hann flaug í akr karls ok fékk þar matar. Karl kom þar ok tók upp stein ok laust spörrinn til bana. Dagr konungr varð illa við, er spörrinn kom eigi heim; gékk hann þá til sónarblóts til fréttar, ok fékk þau svör, at spörr hans var drepinn á Vörva. Síðan bauð hann út her miklum ok fór til Gotlands; en er hann kom á Vörva, gékk hann upp með her sinn ok herjaði: fólkit flýði víðs vegar undan. Dagr konungr sneri herinum til skipa, er kveldaði, ok hafði hann drepit mart fólk ok mart handtekit. En er þeir fóru yfir á nökkura, þar sem heitir Skjótansvað eða Vápnavað, þá rann fram ór skógi einn verkþræll á árbakkann ok skaut heytjúgu í lið þeirra, ok kom í höfuð konungi skotit; féll hann þegar af hestinum ok fékk bana. Í þann tíma var sá höfðingi gramr kallaðr er herjaði, en hermennirnir gramir.

King Dygve's son, called Dag, succeeded to him, and was so wise a man that he understood the language of birds. He had a sparrow which told him much news, and flew to different countries. Once the sparrow flew to Reidgotaland, to a farm called Varva, where he flew into the peasant's corn-field and took his grain. The peasant came up, took a stone, and killed the sparrow. King Dag was ill-pleased that the sparrow did not come home; and as he, in a sacrifice of expiation, inquired after the sparrow, he got the answer that it was killed at Varva. Thereupon he ordered a great army, and went to Gotland; and when he came to Varva he landed with his men and plundered, and the people fled away before him. King Dag returned in the evening to his ships, after having killed many people and taken many prisoners. As they were going across a river at a place called Skjotan's [the Weapon's] Ford, a labouring thrall came running to the river-side, and threw a hay- fork into their troop. It struck the king on the head, so that he fell instantly from his horse and died. In those times the chief who ravaged a country was called Gram, and the men-at-arms under him Gramer.

Following this passage, Snorri quotes stanza 8 of Ynglingatal (see above).

The fact that Skjótansvað/Vápnavað appear both in Ynglinga saga and in Historia Norwegiæ's earlier summary of Ynglingatal, but not in Snorri's later quotation from it, suggests that all of Ynglingatal was not presented by him.

== Notes ==
Dag the Wise House of Yngling
Preceded by Dyggve	Mythological king of Sweden	Succeeded by Agne
