= Domalde =

Legendary King of Sweden

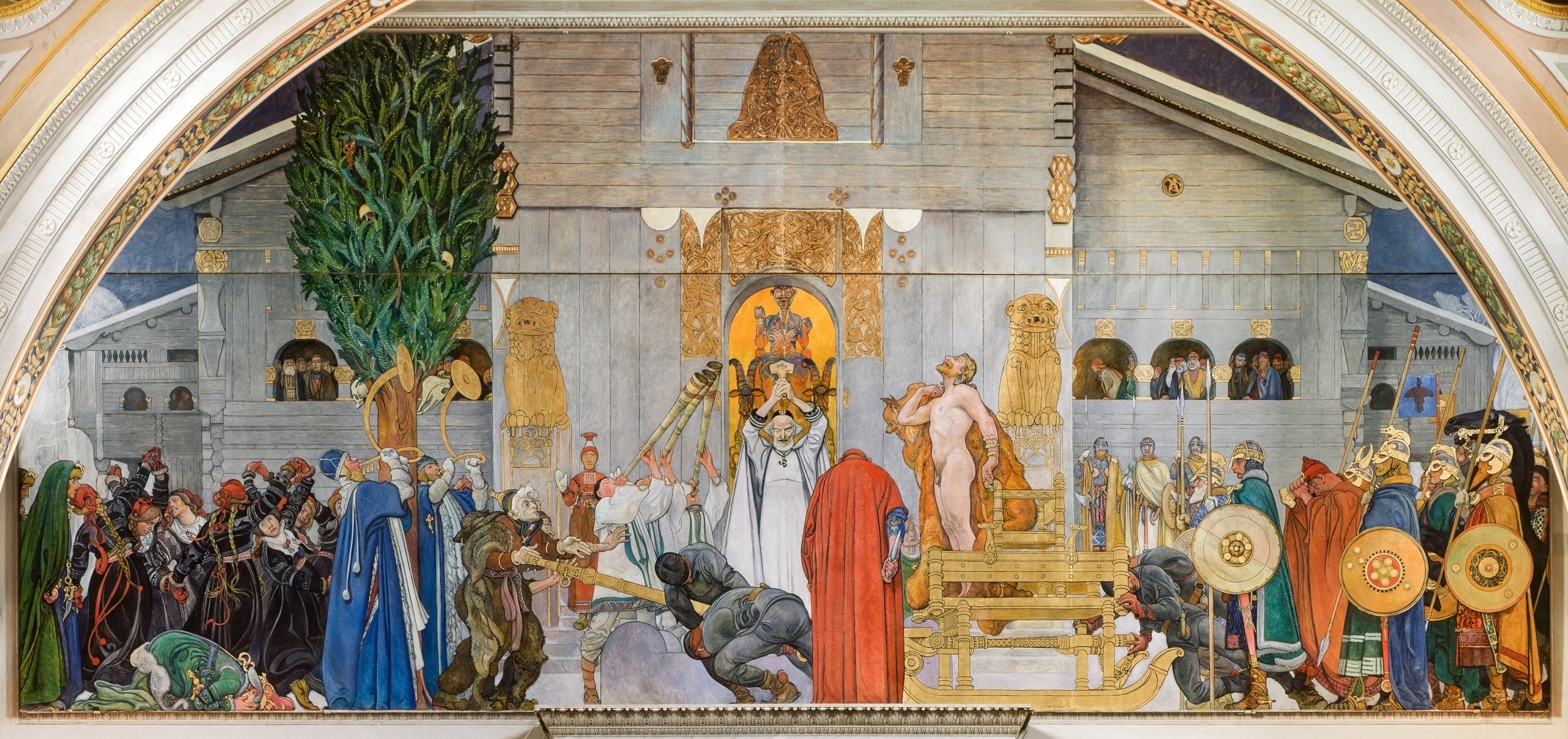
- Midvinterblot (1915) by Carl Larsson, which depicts the offering of king Domalde

Legendary King of Sweden
- Predecessor: Visbur
- Successor: Domar
- Issue: Domar
- Dynasty: House of Yngling
- Father: Visbur
- Mother: second wife of Visbur
- Religion: Norse Paganism

Domalde, Dómaldi or Dómaldr (Old Norse possibly "Power to Judge") was a legendary Swedish king of the House of Ynglings, cursed by his stepmother, according to Snorri Sturluson, with ósgæssa, "ill-luck". He was the son of Visbur.

== Sources ==
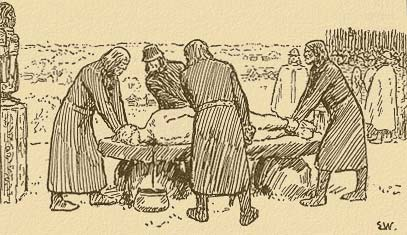
The sacrifice of Domalde by Erik Werenskiold

The luck of the king is the luck of the land, and Domalde's rule was marked by bad crops and starvation. The first autumn, the Swedes sacrificed oxen at the temple at Uppsala, but the next harvest was not better. The second autumn, they sacrificed men, but the following crops were even worse.

The third year many Swedes arrived at Gamla Uppsala at the Thing of all Swedes and the chiefs decided they had to sacrifice the king. They sprinkled the statues of the gods with his blood (see Blót) and the good harvests returned.

He was succeeded by his son Domar whose reign was prosperous.

Snorri Sturluson wrote of Domalde in his Ynglinga saga (1225, part of the Heimskringla):

Dómaldi tók arf eptir föður sinn Vísbur, ok réð löndum. Á hans dögum gerðist í Svíþjóð sultr mikill ok seyra. Þá efldu Svíar blót stór at Uppsölum; hit fyrsta haust blótuðu þeir yxnum, ok batnaði ekki árferð at heldr. En annat haust hófu þeir mannblót, en árferð var söm eða verri. En hit þriðja haust kómu Svíar fjölment til Uppsala, þá er blót skyldu vera. Þá áttu höfðingjar ráðagerð sína; ok kom þat ásamt með þeim, at hallærit mundi standa af Dómalda konungi þeirra, ok þat með, at þeir skyldu honum blóta til árs sér, ok veita honum atgöngu ok drepa hann, ok rjóða stalla með blóði hans. Ok svá gerðu þeir.

Domald took the heritage after his father Visbur, and ruled over the land. As in his time there was great famine and distress, the Swedes made great offerings of sacrifice at Upsalir. The first autumn they sacrificed oxen, but the succeeding season was not improved thereby. The following autumn they sacrificed men, but the succeeding year was rather worse. The third autumn, when the offer of sacrifices should begin, a great multitude of Swedes came to Upsalir; and now the chiefs held consultations with each other, and all agreed that the times of scarcity were on account of their king Domald, and they resolved to offer him for good seasons, and to assault and kill him, and sprinkle the stalle of the gods with his blood. And they did so.

Snorri included a stanza from Þjóðólfr of Hvinir’s 9th century Skaldic poem Ynglingatal in his account in the Ynglinga saga:

Hitt vas fyrr,
at fold ruðu
sverðberendr
sínum dróttni.
Ok landherr
af lífsvǫnum
dreyrug vôpn
Dómalda bar,
þás árgjǫrn
Jóta dolgi
Svía kind
of sóa skyldi.

Translation: ‘It happened earlier that the sword-bearers [WARRIORS] reddened the ground with [the blood of] their leader. And the army of the land bore bloody weapons away from the lifeless Dómaldi when the race of the Swedes, eager for good harvests, had to sacrifice the enemy of the Jótar [= Dómaldi].’

The Historia Norwegiæ presents a Latin summary of Ynglingatal, older than Snorri's quotation:

Cujus [Wisbur] filium Domald Sweones suspendentes pro fertilitate frugum deæ Cereri hostiam obtulerunt. Iste genuit Domar [...]

His [Visbur] son Domalde was hanged by the Swedes as a sacrificial offering to Ceres to ensure the fruitfulness of the crops. Domalde begot Domar, [...]

The even earlier source Íslendingabók cites the line of descent in Ynglingatal and also gives Dómaldr as the successor of Visburr and the predecessor of Dómarr: vii Visburr. viii Dómaldr. ix Dómarr.

== Sources ==
- Ynglingatal
- Ynglinga saga (part of the Heimskringla)
- Historia Norwegiae

Domalde House of Yngling
Preceded by Visbur	Mythological king of Sweden	Succeeded by Domar
