= Kulturhistorisk leksikon for nordisk middelalder =

Nordik Encyclopedia

Kulturhistorisk leksikon for nordisk middelalder fra vikingetid til reformationstid ('A cultural-historical encyclopaedia of the Nordic Middle Ages, from the Viking Age to the Reformation period') was a major Nordic encyclopaedia. It was multilingual, containing articles in the mutually intelligible languages Swedish, Danish and Norwegian according to the subject matter and preferences of the authors. The work edited by Ingvar Andersson (1899-1974) and John Granlund (1901-1982). The work was primarily intended as a reference work for libraries, museums and archives.

Geographically, the work covers the Nordic countries and addresses other topics, including German culture. As a ubiquitous reference work, it has been influential across the Nordic region.

The work has a high scientific level and the articles are signed by the authors.

The encyclopaedia was first published in twenty-two volumes over the period 1956–1978 in a collaboration of three publishers: In Sweden, Allhem (Malmö), in Norway Gyldendal (Oslo), and in Denmark Rosenkilde og Bagger (Copenhagen). The latter press issued a reprint in 1980-1982.
