= Visbur =

Legendary King of Sweden

Legendary King of Sweden
- Predecessor: Vanlande
- Successor: Domalde
- Issue: Domalde; Gisi; Ondur
- Dynasty: House of Yngling
- Religion: Norse Paganism

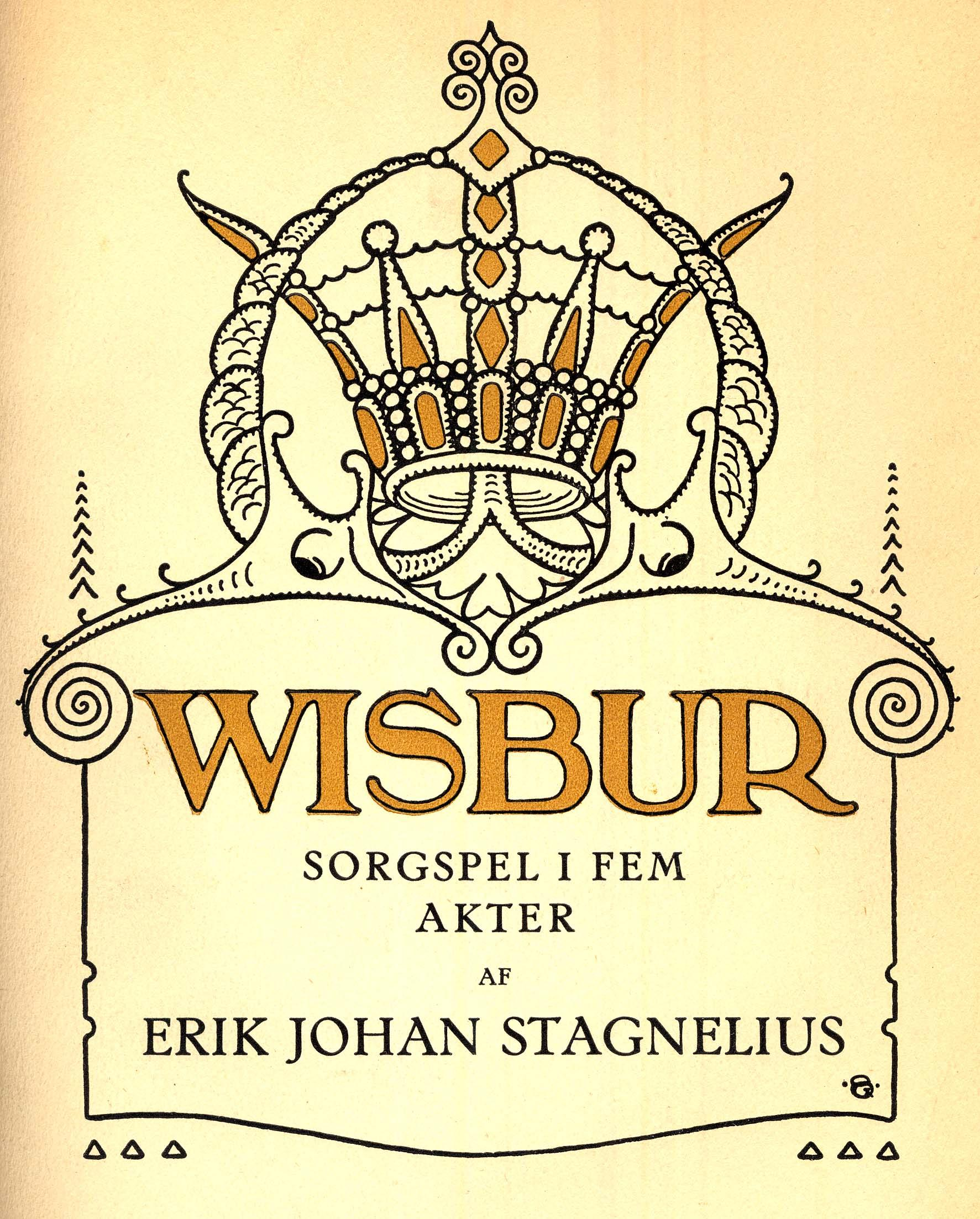
Cover of a play by Erik Johan Stagnelius about the legend of Wisbur

Visbur or Wisbur (Old Norse "Certain/Undoubted Son") was a legendary Swedish king of the House of Ynglings and the son of Vanlandi. He was burned to death inside his hall by the arson of two of his own sons in revenge for rejecting their mother and denying them their heritage. He was succeeded by his son Dómaldi.

== Attestations ==
Snorri Sturluson wrote of Visbur in his Ynglinga saga (1225):

Vísburr tók arf eptir Vanlanda föður sinn; hann gékk at eiga dóttur Auða hins auðga ok gaf henni at mundi þrjá stórbœi ok gullmen. Þau áttu 2 sonu, Gisl ok Öndur. En Vísburr lét hana eina ok fékk annarrar konu; en hon fór til föður síns með sonu sína. Vísbur átti son er Dómaldi hét; stjúpmóðir Dómalda lét síða at honum úgæfu. En er synir Vísburs váru 12 vetra ok 13, fóru þeir á fund hans ok heimtu mund móður sinnar, en hann vildi eigi gjalda. Þá mæltu þeir, at gullmenit skyldi verða at bana hinum bezta manni í ætt hans, ok fóru í brott ok heim. Þá var enn fengit at seið ok siðit til þess, at þeir skyldu mega drepa föður sinn. Þá sagði Huldr völva þeim, at hon mundi svá síða, ok þat með, at ættvíg skyldu ávalt vera í ætt þeirra Ynglinga síðan. Þeir játtu því. Eptir þat sömnuðu þeir liði, ok kómu at Vísbur um nótt á úvart ok brendu hann inni.

Visbur succeeded his father Vanlande. He married the daughter of Aude the Rich, and gave her as her bride-gift three large farms, and a gold ornament. They had two sons, Gisle and Ond; but Visbur left her and took another wife, whereupon she went home to her father with her two sons. Visbur had a son who was called Domald, and his stepmother used witchcraft to give him ill-luck. Now, when Visbur's sons were the one twelve and the other thirteen years of age, they went to their father's place, and desired to have their mother's dower; but he would not deliver it to them. Then they said that the gold ornament should be the death of the best man in all his race, and they returned home. Then they began again with enchantments and witchcraft, to try if they could destroy their father. The sorceress Huld said that by witchcraft she could bring it about by this means, that a murderer of his own kin should never be wanting in the Yngling race; and they agreed to have it so. Thereafter they collected men, came unexpectedly in the night on Visbur, and burned him in his house.

Snorri included a piece from Ynglingatal (9th century) in his account in the Heimskringla:

Ok Visburs vilja byrgi sævar niðr svelga knátti, þá er meinþjóf markar öttu setrs verjendr á sinn föður; ok allvald í arinkjóli glóða garmr glymjandi beit.	Have the fire-dogs' fierce tongues yelling Lapt Visbur's blood on his own hearth? Have the flames consumed the dwelling Of the here's soul on earth? Madly ye acted, who set free The forest foe, red fire, night thief, Fell brother of the raging sea, Against your father and your chief.

The Historia Norwegiæ presents a Latin summary of Ynglingatal, older than Snorri's quotation:

Hic [Wanlanda] genuit Wisbur, quem filii sui cum omni curia sua, ut citius hærenditarentur, vivum incenderunt. Cujus filium Domald [...]

He [Vanlande] was the father of Visbur, whose sons burnt him alive with all his hirdsmen, so that they might attain their inheritance more swiftly. His son Domalde [...]

The even earlier source Íslendingabók cites the line of descent in Ynglingatal and also gives Visburr as the successor of Vanlandi and the predecessor of Dómaldr: vi Vanlandi. vii Visburr. viii Dómaldr.

== Sources ==
- Ynglingatal
- Ynglinga saga (part of the Heimskringla)
- Historia Norwegiae

Visbur House of Yngling
Preceded by Vanlandi	Mythological king of Sweden	Succeeded by Domalde
