= Ynglingatal =

Old Norse skaldic poem

Ynglingatal or Ynglinga tal (Old Norse: 'Enumeration of the Ynglingar') is a Skaldic poem cited by Snorri Sturluson in the Ynglinga saga, the first saga of Snorri's Heimskringla. Þjóðólfr of Hvinir (Thjodolf), who was a poet for Harald Fairhair (r. 872–930), is traditionally credited with its authorship. Snorri quotes frequently from this poem and cites it as one of the sources of the saga. The composition of the poem is dated to the 9th century.

The poem lists the partly mythical and partly historical ancient Swedish kings; twenty-seven of whom are mentioned in the poem, along with details about their deaths and burial places. The title Ynglingatal alludes to Yngling, who had the name Yngve-Frey—another name for Frey, the god who was worshipped in Sweden. Yngling allegedly descended from Frey's son Fjölnir. Snorri portrayed Harald Fairhair as a descendant of the Ynglings. The poem was written on behalf of Ragnvald Heidumhære, a cousin of King Harald Fairhair, and its last stanza is about Ragnvald.

== Verse forms and text history ==
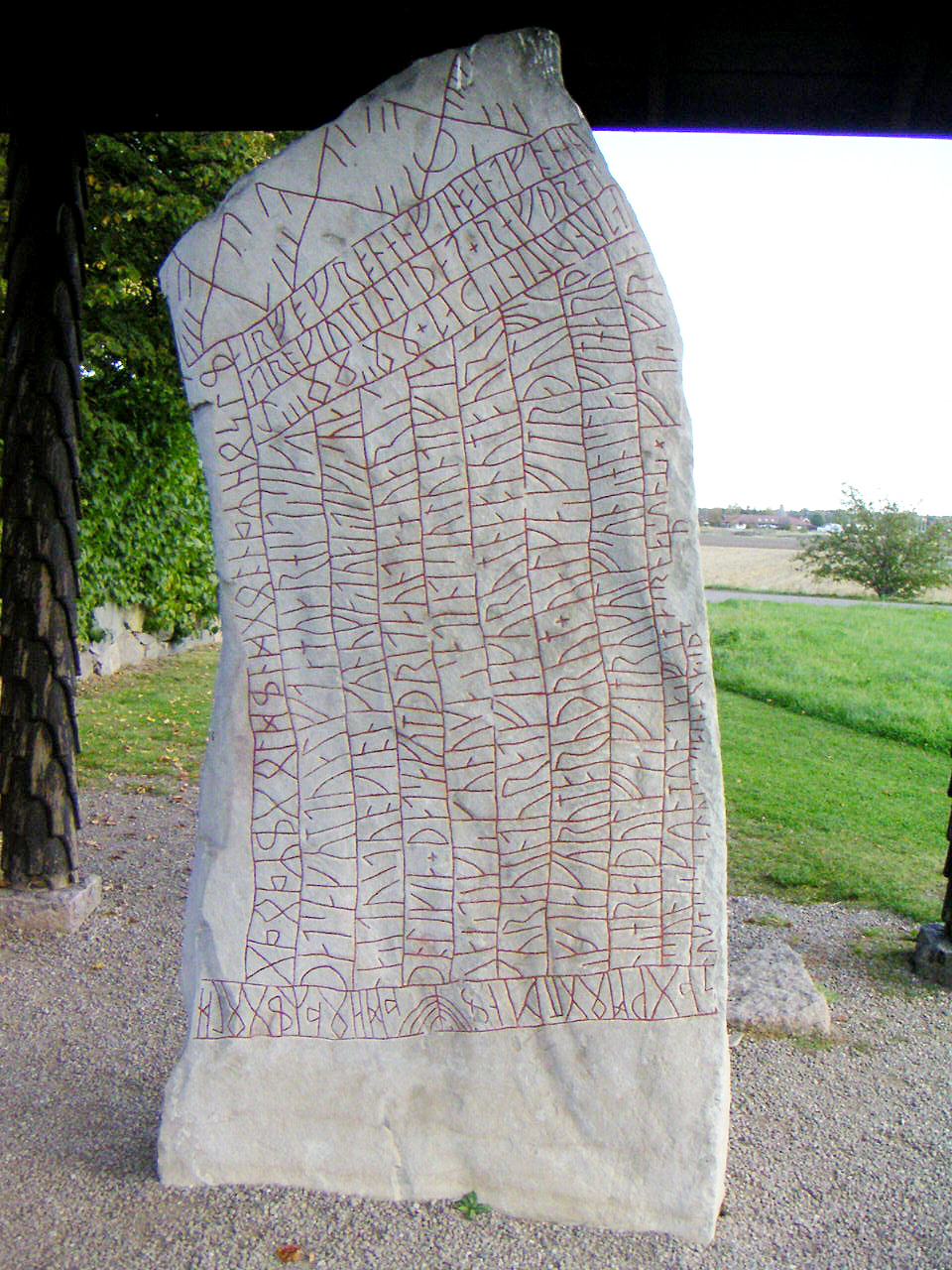
The Rök runestone, the stone that may have inspired the bard who wrote Ynglingatal

Ynglingatal is composed in kviðuháttr (modern Norwegian kviduhått); this genealogical verse form is also used in Son loss (Sonatorrek) in Egils saga. In this form of verse, the lines alternate between three and four syllables—the first line has three syllables, the next has four, the next three, and so on. For example:

Ok Vísburs
vilja byrði
sævar niðr
svelgja knátti, [...]

‘And the kinsman of the sea [FIRE] swallowed the ship of the will [BREAST] of Vísburr [...]’

Ynglingatal has also makes extensive use of acquaintance, such as rewriting and metaphors that give life to the poem, which otherwise contains much litany.

The Icelandic philologist Finnur Jónsson believed the eight-line stanza defines Ynglingatal's structure, while Walter Akerlund believed the four-line helming—the half-stanza as in the example above—defines the poem's structure. Akerlund has also said the bard Thjodolf learned the verse-form kviðuháttr by studying the Rök runestone in present-day Sweden, which dates from around the year 800.

=== The Ynglings in other sources ===
Ynglingatal is preserved in its entirety in Snorri's Ynglinga saga, which Snorri wrote based on the poem. In the saga, Snorri expanded his text by quoting from the poem in addition to his own text. A stanza from Ynglingatal is also quoted in Þáttr Ólafs Geirstaða Alfs. Stories that build on the poem are found in the Norwegian history, Historia Norvegiæ, which was written in Latin in the late 1100s, and in the short saga Af Upplendinga konungum (About the upplander-kings). Ynglingtal is also indirectly preserved as a list of names in Íslendingabók from the early 1100s. A few of the characters in Ynglingatal are also mentioned in the Old English poem Beowulf.

== About the author ==
According to Snorri, Ynglingatal was composed by the scald Þjóðólfr of Hvinir, who was from Kvinesdal in what is now Agder county, Norway. In the preamble to the Heimskringla, Snorri writes that Thjodolf, in addition to composing the poem Ynglingatal, was poet at Harald Fairhair's hird (royal retinue).

Thjodolf also appears in the Saga of Harald Fairhair, in the mythical story of Harald and the Sami girl Snæfrithr Svásadottir, who cursed Harald to marry her. According to the saga, Harald and Snøfrid had four sons but Harald sent them away when he woke up from the curse. Thjodolf raised one of these sons, Gudrod Ljome. When Thjodolf learned Harald had disowned his sons, he sided with the boys and said to Harald, "They probably would have liked better ancestry, if you had given them that". The saga contains no information about Thjodolf being Harald's scald; that is only mentioned in Snorri's preamble. In the saga he is only referred to as a friend of Harald and as the son whom Godred fostered. Snorri also quotes several other poems of Thjodolf in Harald Fairhair's saga.

The historian Claus Krag proposes that the connection between Harald Fairhair and Thjodolf was constructed by Snorri, probably because Thjodolf would have been an important person in the development of scaldic art, while according to tradition, Harald was Norway's first national king. To create a connection between them would thus enhance both their reputations. According to Finnur Jonsson, Thjodolf was Harald's scald without dwelling much on the subject. Finnur said Thjodolf was not a hird scald, but a scald who mostly stayed home on the farm, where in another saga we meet Thjodolf's grandson. Snorri mentions a man named Torgrim from Kvine, "son" to Thjodolf in the Olav Tryggvasson saga. Beyond this there are no more references to Thjodolf in the sagas in Heimskringla. Snorri wrote the preamble and the saga in the 1220s, over 300 years after Thjodolf should have lived, so any information about him is uncertain.

== Author myth and royal ideology ==
According to the Ynglinga saga, Fjolne, the first king described in Ynglingatal, was the son of the god Frey and a giantess named Gerd. The actual poem mentions nothing about this, but since it only survives in citation it may have been mentioned in a lost verse. Frey, the great fertility god in the Nordic countries, entered into a sacred wedding (Hiero Gamos) with Gerd, which is retold in the poem Skírnismál. The mythological purpose of the holy wedding is to bear a child who is the child of both the parents but is neither god or giant but something completely different that will be the first of a "new" species; a new royal family. With effort and tensions from this, the king, who has high status, is valued above all other people. The author of the myth gives the king a special destiny as the main symbol within the ruling ideology in the Norse-thought universe.

Both major ruling families in Norway, the Ynglings and Earls of Lade, legitimized their statuses by using a wedding myth. Just as Yngling had their legitimacy reinterpreted in Ynglingatal, the Ladejarlsætt got its equivalent in the poem Háleygjatal, which was written by the Norwegian poet Eyvindr skáldaspillir at the end of the 900s. In Háleygjatal it is Odin and the giantess Skade were of mythological origin, and their son Sæming is the ancestor of Hákon jarl. Both poems were thus used as genealogies and served as mythological propaganda, poetry, and grounds for alliances.

According to religious historian Gro Steinsland, the myth also has an erotic element and is thus a fertility myth that tells of the relationship between the ruler and his "territory"; the scalds describe the land as a sexual, longing giantess who rested in the earl's arms. The prince guarantees growth and prosperity in their territory. There may have been a special connection between the king and the fertility goddess in times of crisis he was sacrificed to her. This is seen in Ynglingatal where Swedes sacrificed King Domalde after a prolonged famine. This is illustrated in Carl Larsson's controversial monumental picture Midvinterblot, but there are no other sources supporting the sacrificing of a king.

== Content ==
Ynglingatal consists of 27 stanzas and a litany of different kings and how they died. It starts with Fjölnir, who according to the Ynglinga saga was the son of Frey. This relationship is not mentioned in the actual poem. Fjolne drowned in a mead tub. The poem continues with his son Sveigðir, who followed a dwarf into a rock and never came out again. Then comes Sveigde's son Vanlande, who was strangled by a mare. Vanlande's son Visbur was burned alive and his son Domalde was sacrificed by the Swedish chiefs to get a good year's harvest. Domalde had his son Domar, who died of illness in Uppsala. Domar's son Dyggve also died of illness, and his son Dag the Wise was killed by a slave with a pitchfork when he was out to avenge the death of a sparrow. Dag's son Agne was hung by his wife Skjålv, and Agne's sons Alaric and Eric killed each other with a bridle when they were out riding. Their sons Yngve and Alf killed each other after being incited by Alf's wife Bera.

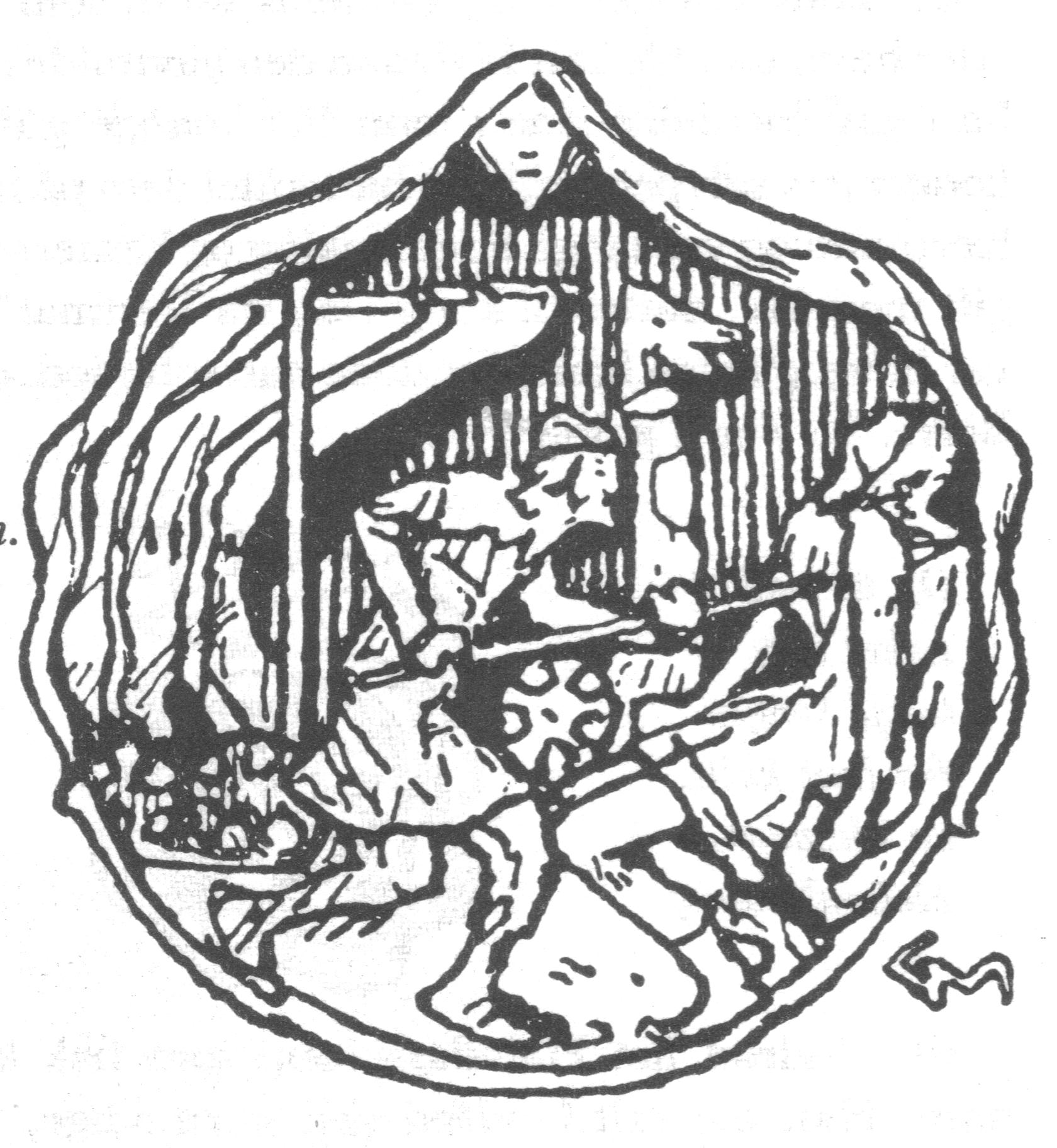
Gudrod's death. Vignette by Gerhard Munthe

The poem continues with varying degrees of mythical ways to die. Eventually the Yngling kings walked through the woods from the Svea kingdom to Norway. Here there is a clear break in the series and it is possible Thjodolf is linked here to the Norwegian seed in the Swedish genealogies to provide the Norwegian kings with a divine origin and thus greater legitimacy. The first breeding of the kings of Norway was supposed to have been Halfdan Hvitbeinn, who died in his bed at Toten. According to the poem, his son Eystein was killed on a ship; he was beaten by the boat's vessel and fell into the sea. Eystein's son Halfdan died in his bed in Borre, where he was buried. Halfdan's son Gudrød was killed by the servant of his wife Åsa. The poem ends with Halfdan's son Olaf Geirstad-Alf and grandson Ragnvald Heidumhære. Tjodolv dedicated Ynglingatal to Ragnvald. The last stanza reads:

Þat veitk bazt
und blôum himni
kenninafn,
svát konungr eigi,
es Rǫgnvaldr,
reiðar stjóri,
heiðumhôr
of heitinn es.

‘I know that nickname to be the best under the blue sky that a king might have, that Rǫgnvaldr, the steerer of the carriage [RULER], is called ‘High with Honours’.’

According to Snorri's Ynglinga Saga, Harald Fairhair's father Halfdan the Black was the half-brother of Olav Geirstadalv and Harald, and was thus Ragnvald's cousin, but neither Harald nor his father Halfdan are mentioned in the poem, so this is probably an attempt by Snorri and other writers to make Harald look more royal. It may have been the Icelandic poet Ari Þorgilsson who constructed the genealogy of the Ynglings and connected Harald Fairhair's seed to Ynglingatal. Snorri later developed this to the Ynglinga Saga.

== Debate on the dating ==
The content of Ynglingatal has been interpreted and discussed, mostly during the National Romantic period of the 1800s. Norwegian historians Rudolf Keyser and Peter Andreas Munch held the traditional dating to the late 800s. The same applies to the historian Gustav Storm and the Icelandic philologist Finnur Jonsson. Around the time of World War I, saga literature was subjected to much criticism as a historical source, in Sweden by the brothers Lauritz and Curt Weibull, and in Norway by Halvdan Koht and Edvard Bull. In 1908, German philologist Gustav Neckel said Ynglingatal had to be a construction from the 1100s; Norwegian historian Claus Krag also said this in his book Ynglingatal and Yngling Saga. A study of historical sources, and joins Neckel's hypothesis.

=== The late hypothesis ===
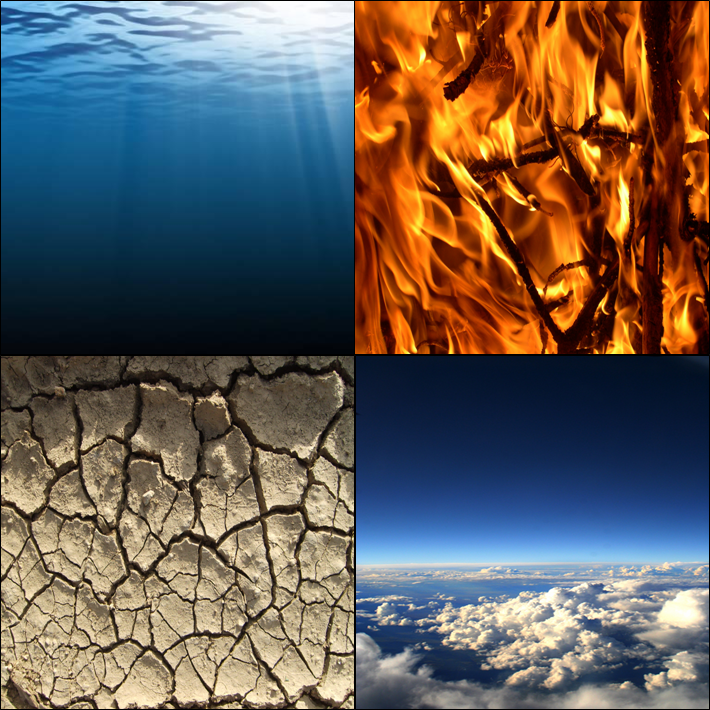
Krag found a literary pattern of elements in the kings' deaths

Claus Krag claimed in 1990 that Ynglingatal's origin should be dated to the 1100s and that it was based on other royal lists. In a research project during the 1980s Krag's attempt to justify the doubt regarding Ynglingatal's age began to take shape, disregarding the traditional, uncritical acceptance. Krag studied the Yngling tradition's place in folklore and the Yngling's genealogy in relation to other European royal genealogies and scholarly genealogical works in Iceland.

As an argument, Krag proposed that the first four kings' deaths represent the cosmology of Greek philosopher Empedocles, with the four classical elements Earth, Water, Air, and Fire, and thus that a euhemeristic vision influenced the description of the first few generations. Krag's hypothesis has received serious criticism on several points, and so far "a convincing case has not been made against the authenticity of the poem as a ninth-century creation".

=== The early dating ===
Krag's late dating has been challenged. If the saga is a late work of propaganda, it should reasonably have been concluded with Norwegian king Harald Fairhair and not by his largely unknown cousin Ragnvald Heidrumhære, whose meaning seems otherwise to have been lost after 1000. There are places and names in the poem that archeology has shown to have had great importance until the Viking Age, but not later, and thus should not have been stated in a more recent saga. Archeologist Dagfinn Skre is an advocate for these arguments.

According to Swedish researcher Olof Sundquist, Krag bypasses clear signs of Ynglingatal on a tradition of Swedish area visible in kenning, place names and personal names. Cultural phenomena such as a king who goes to holy places and the memory of a warrior elite can point to ancient human migrations. Sundquist posits the theory that Thjodolf from Kvine composed his works in the 900s and based them on an extant tradition. He also said Empedocles' cosmology can hardly be argued as evidence of late dating; in that case it would be influenced by Britannia or Franks.

The fact Snorri has reproduced the poem suggests he would probably have known about any falsification a century earlier and refrained from reproducing the erroneous text. Ynglingatal also inspired Eyvindr skáldaspillir's Háleygjatal, which demonstrably was written in the late 900s.

Another argument for early dating comes from the Icelandic philologist Bergsveinn Birgisson, whose doctoral thesis said Ynglingatal is not supposed to be a praising poem but an entertainment poem and a warning. He asserts this partly based on the grotesque and often ridiculous ways the kings in the poem die—they often appear to be dishonorable, which is clearly in breach of customs of the praising poem. Bergsveinn says the poem is old but the meaning of the praising poem is constructed by Snorri and other scholars of the Middle Ages. He also says Ynglingatal was not originally a genealogy, but is about different families. According to Bergsveinn, the perception or construction of the poem as genealogy originates from the High Middle Ages.

=== A middle ground ===
Swedish archeologist Svante Norr argues for an intermediate position for dating Ynglingatal. He said it is neither an authentic poem of the Viking Age nor a text from the Middle Ages. Norr accepts the traditional dating of poems origin, but says the poem was sung for the more than 300 years until it was written down gradually, and must have undergone major changes to fit it into contemporaneous social conditions. According to Norr, genealogical poems cannot be used as historical sources because they depend on extant ideological, political and social conditions. He says the poem must be viewed as a development and a result of a long process of change. The Norwegian archaeologist Bjørn Myhre joins largely to Norr's standpoint.

== Yngling ==
The meaning of term "yngling" is usually interpreted as "descendants of Yngve", but as in modern Nordic, it can also mean "young man". In skaldic poems, the word yngling is only used in the singular; only in the sagas has it has been used in the plural Ynglings; thus the ynglings of the poem cannot be defined as one family. The term may be a kenning, a euphemism, for the prince or king and not something connected with a particular family. Bergsveinn Birgisson says Ynglingatal is not a genealogy, but a poem about people from different clans. Not all sources agree; in Historia Norvegiæ, About Uplanders kings and Íslendingabók, several of the kings of other names than in Ynglingatal or are said to live on or be buried elsewhere. Finnur Jonsson said the various descriptions stem from the kings mentioned in Ynglingatal; all have different traditions handed down by word of mouth. He said Thjodolf's poem is an attempt at a synthesis of different oral traditions about different kings.

=== Euhemerism ===
According to Snorri, the Yngling stemmed from the gods Yngve-Frey and Odin. This kinship, a euhemerism, is not left in the poem; only Snorri's words support this. Finnur Jonsson said he thought this song originally contained several verses and started with Yngve. Religion historian Walter Baetke said Yngligatal was free of euhemerism—the notion of lineage of gods was added in the Christian era. Claus Krag said the first kings of the poem are historicized gods, and that the hypothesis of lost stanzas may be rejected.

=== Historical accuracy ===
Opinions differ on whether breedings were historical figures. If all the kings in this poem really existed, the first of them must have lived in the Migration Period. It is usually only the "Norwegian" part of Ynglings—from Halfdan Hvitbeinn—that scientists have tried to prove or disprove were real, historical persons. They partly reasoned that people in Norse times kept track of their genus for six generations, thus it is possible to follow Harald Fairhair's ancestors back to Halfdan Hvitbeinn. Norwegian historians and archeologists have traditionally held the Norwegian Ynglings to be historical people.

Because of problems with dating, it is problematic to work out when these people might have lived. Are Frode, in the 1100s, was probably the first person who tried to convert the dates from relative time stamps to absolute chronological dates on the basis of Jesus' birth; the reckoning began to be used during the Middle Ages and is still in use. Are dated Harald Fairhair's birth to 848, and until the 1920s historians used Are's reckoning to calculate the composition time stamp for different people and events. In 1921 historian Halvdan Koht introduced generation counting and his method became the dominant one. In 1964, Icelandic historian Ólafía Einarsdóttir found the old Icelandic reckoning more accurate; with adjustments this has since been the most commonly used approach.

	Date of birth according to Ólafía Einarsdóttir	Date of birth according to Halvdan Koht
Halfdan Hvitbeinn	660	695
Eystein Halfdansson	695	730
Halfdan the Mild	725	760
Gudrød the Hunter	760	795
Olaf Geirstad-Alf	795	830
Ragnvald Heidumhære	825	860
Halfdan the Black	818	830
Harald Fairhair	848	865

Traditionally, historians have attributed great source value to scaldic poems because of the tight form that made them easier to remember than narratives. If Ynglingatal is really from the late 800s, recent events would be relatively close in time to the scald, and there is a high likelihood the poem renders information about real people and events. Nevertheless, there is a distance of 500 years from Halfdan Hvitbeinn to Snorri, and 250 years from the poem's composition to the time Snorri wrote it down. Whether the original poem is preserved is uncertain. If Ynglingatal is younger, perhaps dating from the end of the 1100s as Krag says, its value as a source of real events shrinks further. According to Fidjestøl, the scald's main task was to express the Kingdom's official ideology, not necessarily render the facts.

Archeologists, particularly Anton Wilhelm Brøgger in the early 1900s, have made many attempts to "place" the various youth kings and their wives in barrows in Vestfold. The most famous examples are the Queen Åsa in Oseberghaugen outside Tønsberg and Olaf Geirstad-Alf in Gokstadhaugen outside Sandefjord. In addition, archeologists have said the remains of Eystein Halfdansson, Halfdan the Mild, Gudrød the Hunter, and Halfdan the Black are located at Borrehaugene outside Horten. When the issue of Ynglingatal's value as a source and recent archeological methods including C14 dating and dendrochronology are taken into account, finding out who was buried in the various barrows on the basis of information in this poem is at best educated guessing.

=== Yngling as common European tradition ===
In 1943, Danish historian Niels Lukmann said the Nordic folklore tradition, of which Yngling is a part, originated from the migration period and that people have historically not been Nordic figures. According to Lukmann, poems and legends about the Danish clans Scylding and Skilfings, which have much in common with the Ynglings, are part of a tradition from the migration period that really dealt with Huns and Heruli kings, and which has gradually evolved into legends known from the Norse period. Krag says this also fits with the Ynglings and he argues for many similarities in names, people and events.

== Line of kings ==
The line of kings according to Ynglingatal:

- Fjölnir
- Sveigðir
- Vanlandi
- Visburr
- Dómaldr
- Dómarr
- Dyggvi
- Dagr Spaka
- Agni
- Eiríkr and Alrekr
- Yngvi and Alfr
- Jörundr
- Aun
- Egil
- Óttarr
- Aðils
- Eysteinn
- Yngvarr
- Braut-Önundr
- Ingjaldr hinn illráði
- Óláfr trételgja
- Hálfdan hvítbeinn
- Eysteinn Hálfdansson
- Hálfdan hinn mildi
- Guðröðr veiðikonung
- Óláfr
- Rögnvaldr heiðum hæra
