= List of figures in Germanic heroic legend, P–S =

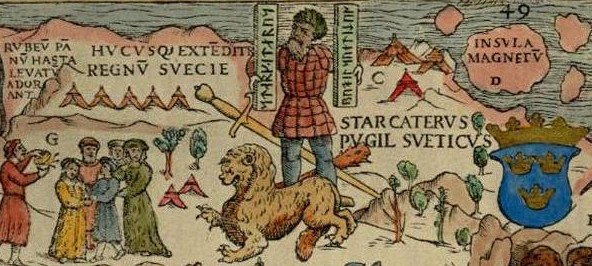
Starkad as illustrated on Carta Marina (1539) by Olaus Magnus.

== P ==
Figure	Names in medieval languages	Historical origin	Name meaning	Relationships	Early and English Attestations	Norse Attestations	German Attestations
Patavrid	Latin: Patavrid		The first element pata from PGmc *badu ("battle"), the second element PGmc *friþu ("peace").	Hagen/Högni^{1}'s nephew, Hagen unsuccessfully tries to prevent him from fighting against Hagen's friend Walter of Aquitaine when Gunther orders the latter's capture while he is crossing Burgundian territory. Patvrid is then killed with ten other of Gunther's men. Patavrid may correspond to Hagen's nephew Ortwin^{1} von Metz in later legends.			Waltharius
Perdeo	Latin: Peredeo		First element PGmc *bera ("bear"), second element PGmc *þiwa ("servant").	A servant of Alboin. He helps Alboin's wife Rosamund kill Alboin after he forces her to drink from her father's skull.	Historia Langobardorum		
Pilgrim	Middle High German: Pilgerîn	Piligrim, Bishop of Passau 971–991, who was involved in the conversion of the Hungarians.	From Latin peregrinus ("pilgrim").	Bishop of Passau and brother of Ute and thus uncle of the Burgundian kings. After the disaster at Attila's court, he collects information and has the story of the Nibelungen written down.			Nibelungenlied, Nibelungenklage

== R ==
Figure	Names in medieval languages	Historical origin	Name meaning	Relationships	Early and English Attestations	Norse Attestations	German Attestations
Ráðbarðr	Old Norse: Ráðbarðr, Old English: Rædhere?		The first element is Ráð ("advice", "decision"). The second element is formed by bǫð(v), PN *baðu from PGmc *baðwō meaning "battle" and frøðr from PN *friþuʀ meaning "love" and "peace". The second element in Rædhere means "army", i.e. the name means "command army".	A king of Garðaríki (Rus'). Sögubrot tells that he married the fugitive princess Auðr the Deep-Minded without the consent of her father king Ivar Vidfamne, who soon departed to punish his daughter. He died en route, however, and so Ráðbarðr helped Auð's son Harald Wartooth claim his maternal grandfather's possessions in Sweden and Denmark. Ráðbarðr and Auðr had a son together named Randver^{2}. He may be mentioned in Widsith together with his son Randver^{2} as Rædhere and Rondhere. Rognvald the Tall (or Rognvald the Russian) is identified in Gesta Danorum as his nephew, and as taking part in the Battle of Brávellir.	Possibly in Widsith, line 123	Sögubrot, Hyndluljóð, Hversu Noregr byggðist, Gesta Danorum VIII	
Rædhere				See Ráðbarðr, above.			
Ragnar Lodbrok	Old Norse: Ragnarr Loðbrók	Originates in a historical ninth-century Viking named Reginheri who attacked Paris in 845.	The name is from PN *Ragina-harjaʀ, corresponding to the Vandalic name Raginahari and the Old High German name Reginheri. The first element of the name is from PGmc *raʒina, which in personal names probably meant "counsel", but it may have been reinterpreted to have the religious meaning of "divine powers". and the second element is *-harjaʀ ("war chief, warrior").	On the basis of a historic kernel, legendary matter was added to the character. Ragnar's raid against the Franks was treated as an attack on the Bjarmians, and matter from the Völsung/Nibelung tradition was added. Like Sigurd, he kills a great serpent, and like Gunnar he perishes in a snake pit. The Great Heathen Army is a war of vengeance in reaction to his death by his sons. The legends reached such fame that Ragnar was conflated with the historical king Reginfrid (d. 814) and the feats of this kings and his descendants were attributed to Ragnar. In Gesta Danorum, he is king of Denmark, Sweden, Norway, Russia, England and Scotland, and the deeds of other legendary kings are attributed to him. He was also made the progenitor of Scandinavian dynasties through his sons Sigurd Snake-in-the-Eye (in Denmark) and Björn Ironside (in Sweden). In Norway and Iceland the tradition was expanded with Aslaug who was raised in poverty, but abducted by Ragnar and made his queen because of her beauty. Ragnar was made into the son-in-law of Sigurd the dragon slayer. The Icelandic genealogists of the 12th and 13th centuries, who claimed that the prominent families of the island were descended from Norwegian royalty included Ragnar in their family trees and described the daughter or granddaughter of Sigurd Snake-in-the-Eye as the mother of Harald Fairhair the first king of Norway, so that also the Norwegian kings became Ragnar's descendants. On Iceland, the traditions of the Yngling and Skjöldung dynasties were added by connecting him to Harald Wartooth and making Ragnar the son of Sigurd Ring.		Gesta Danorum, Ragnars saga loðbrókar, Norna-Gests þáttr	
Ragnhild	Old Norse: Ragnhildr		The first element of the name is from PGmc *raʒina, which in personal names probably meant "counsel", but it may have been reinterpreted to have the religious meaning of "divine powers". The second element -hild is from PN *heldiō- meaning "struggle", "fight".	In Ragnarssona þáttr and Hálfdanar saga svarta, Ragnhild is the daughter of Sigurd Hart and Ingibjorg, the daughter of Harald Klak. She also has a brother named Gudthorm^{2}. Haki a berserker from Hadeland killed their father, while he was out hunting. Then he went to their home in Ringerike and captured Raghnild and Gutthorm^{2}. He intended to marry the 15-year-old girl but being severely wounded the wedding was postponed. In the winter, Halfdan the Black came and took Ragnhild and Gutthorm^{2} and set fire to Haki's hall killing his men. Haki survived and pursued them until he came to lake Mjøsa, where he committed suicide by falling on his own sword. Halfdan invited all the important men in Hedmark and married Ragnhild. She was the mother of Harald Fairhair.		Ragnarssona þáttr, Hálfdanar saga svarta, Ragnars saga loðbrókar	
Randolf	Latin: Randolf		The first element, randu means "shield", and the second element means "wolf".	The eighth warrior of Gunther killed by Waltharius.			Waltharius
Randver^{1}	Old Norse: Randvér, Broderus	Possibly derived from Ermanaric's son Hunimundus.	The first element Rand- means "shield" and the second element vēʀ is either from PGmc *wīhaz, probably meaning "priest", or an agent noun of a verb cognate with Gothic weihan ("fight"), and would thus mean "fighter".	In the Old Norse tradition, Randver is put to death after Bikki (Sibeche) convinces Randver to sleep with the Ermanaric's new bride Svanhildr and then informs Ermanaric. In the Gesta Danorum, Ermanaric only pretends to hang Randver (called Broderus), who becomes the king of Denmark after Ermanaric's death.		Guðrúnarhvöt, Hamðismál, Gesta Danorum, Völsunga saga.	
Randver^{2}	Old Norse: Randvér, Old English: Rondhere?		See Randver^{1} in the English name Rondhere, rond means "border" or "shield" and here means "army".	The brother of Harald Wartooth. About his parentage, the sources vary greatly. According to Hervarar saga, he married Ása, the daughter of Harald Red-bearded, king of Agder, and with her he had the son Sigurd Ring. When Randver suddenly died Sigurd Ring became king of the Danes and fought Harald Wartooth at the Battle of Brávellir. However, according to Ynglinga saga, Harald the Read-bearded's daughter Ása married Gudrød the Hunter with whom she had Halfdan the Black, the father of Harald Fairhair. Also, in other sources, Sigurd Ring was the king of Sweden. He may be mentioned in Widsith together with his father Ráðbarðr^{2} as Rædhere and Rondhere.	Possibly in Widsith, line 123	Sögubrot, Lay of Hyndla, Hversu Noregr Byggðist, Hervarar saga	
Refil	Old Norse: Refill or Ræfill		The name is derived from refr ("fox") and also appears in the expression refil-stígar ("secret ways").	In the Hervarar saga, Refil is the son of Björn Ironside and the brother of Eric Björnsson who succeeded their father as the king of Sweden. Eric did not rule long, and was succeeded by Refil's son Eric Refilsson. Refil is reported by Hervarar saga to have been a warlord and a sea-king. The Skáldskaparmál part of the Prose Edda also lists him as a sea-king, and it tells that his name was also used in kennings in skaldic poetry and teaches that the phrase Ræfill's land refers to the "sea", and ships are the horses of Ræfill's land, and their riders are seamen.		Hervarar saga, Prose Edda	
Reginn/Mimir	Old Norse: Reginn or Old Norse: Mímir (Þiðreks saga), Middle High German: Mîme or Eckerîch	Mythical being.	Reginn from PGmc *Raʒina- ("decision"). Mimir probably from PGmc *mīm- ("to measure, think").	Smith and/or dwarf. Foster father of Sigurd/Siegfried. In the Norse sources, including the Þiðreks saga, he is the brother of the dragon (Fafnir). In Biterolf und Dietleib, he is a master smith who lives near Toledo in Spain. In Rosengarten zu Worms, it is mentioned that Siegfried was raised by the smith Eckerich. Sigurd kills him after killing the dragon in the Norse tradition.		Reginsmál, Fafnismál, Skáldskaparmál, Völsunga saga, Norna-Gests þáttr	Þiðreks saga, Rosengarten zu Worms, Biterolf und Dietleib, unnamed smith in Lied vom Hürnen Seyfrid
Regin	Old Norse: Reginn		See Reginn, but in the Hrólfs saga kraka used in the plot to evoke regin meaning "divine power" and regn meaning "rain".	Fróði killed his brother Halfdan and succeeded him as Danish king. Regin was the foster-father of Halfdan's sons Roar (Hrothgar) and Helgi (Halga) and saved them by taking them to their father's best friend Vífill. Fróði found them but Vífill saved them by calling them by the names of his two dogs. However, knowing that the 12 and 10-year-old boys were no longer safe with him, he sent them to jarl Saevil instead. They were later revealed by a prophetess (Völva) and had to flee again, but Regin and Saevil helped them kill Fróði by burning him to death inside his hall.		Hrólfs saga kraka	
Reginbald	Old Norse: Reginballdr		For the first element, see Reginn. The second element means "prince" or "foremost".	The second son of Ermanaric in the Þiðreks saga. Sibeche (Sifka) arranges for him to die by sending him to collect tribute in England in an unseaworthy ship.			Þiðreks saga
Rentwin	Middle High German: Rentwîn	A similar event to Rentwin's being swallowed by the dragon is depicted on the coat of arms of the Visconti, who owned the castle Arona where Rentwin also lives.	The first element is from PGmc *randu ("edge of a shield"), the second element is PGmc *wini ("friend").	The son of Hilferich. Dietrich von Bern saves him from being swallowed by a dragon.			Virginal
Rerir		Probably fictive.	According to Müllenhof from an older *rœrir from rausa, meaning "to talk loud and fast".	Rerir's father Sigi has been banished for the murder of an able thrall, but his father Odin give him several warships that Sigi used successfully for pillaging until he ended up as the ruler of the Huns (but in the Prose Edda of the Franks), and the father of Rerir who was fostered at home. When Rerir was away and Sigi only had a smaller force, his jealous brothers-in-law took advantage of it and killed him. Rerir avenged his father by killing his uncles and succeeded him as ruler of the Huns. His queen could not conceive, but the goddess Frigg and Odin heard heir prayers and sent them an apple to eat transported by a Valkyrie transformed into a crow. It would take six years of pregnancy before their son Völsung was cut out from her womb and in the meantime, Rerir died on a war expedition.		Völsunga saga	
Richart (Ritschart)	Middle High German: Rîchart or Ritschart		The first element is PGmc *rīk-s ("ruler, king"), the second element is PGmc hardu ("hard"). The spelling "Ritschart" reflects the Old French pronunciation of the name.	One of Dietrich von Bern's warriors; in Biterolf und Dietleib, he is the brother of Wolfwin and Wolfbrand.			Nibelungenlied, Biterolf und Dietleib, Alpharts Tod
Rienolt	Middle High German: Rienolt or Rein(h)olt, Old Norse: Reinaldr		From OHG *ragan- or *regin-, an emphatic prefix. The second element is -*walt, related to OHG waltan ("to rule"), but is sometimes replaced by -holt, probably MHG holt ("friendly, loyal").	One of Ermanaric's vassals. In the Þiðreks saga, he warns Dietrich von Bern of Ermanaric's betrayal.			Þiðreks saga, Dietrichs Flucht, Rabenschlacht, Alpharts Tod, Biterolf und Dietleib, Rosengarten zu Worms, Virginal, Ermenrichs Tod
Rimstein (Ribestein)	Middle High German: Rimstein, possibly Ribestein, Old Norse: Rimsteinn, possibly Old English: Rūmstān		Förstemann connects the first element Rim to OE and ON hrím- ("frost") from PGmc *χrīma-, while stein/stān is from PGmc *stainaz ("stone"). The first element in the English form means "generous" or possibly "Rome".	In Biterolf und Dietleib, Rimstein aids the Harlungen in the tournament with the Burgundians. In Þiðreks saga, he refuses Ermanaric's demands for tribute and is killed by Witige. Kemp Malone associated Rūmstān, who appears in Widsith along with the Harlungen, with Rimstein. A figure named Ribestein, associated with Rimstein by Jacob Grimm, is executed by Eckehart in Dietrich's Flucht for advising Ermanaric to kill the Harlungen.	Possibly in Widsith	Þiðreks saga	Biterolf und Dietleib, possibly in Dietrichs Flucht as Ribestein
Rodgeir	Old Norse: Ródgeir	According to Jiriczek, the name is probably the invention of the saga author, however William Paff suggests his capital at Salerno in Apulia indicates an origin in the name Roger, a Norman name commonly used by rulers of that area from 1061 to 1154.	See Hrothgar, Rüdiger.	An earl and father of Hildisvid, brother of Brunstein. He is killed when he resists his daughter's abduction by Samson.			Þiðreks saga
Rognvald	Old Norse: Rǫgnvaldr, Latin: Raugnvaldus, Regnaldus	Rægnald, a Viking king of York (died 920).	The first element of the name is from PGmc *raʒina, which in personal names probably meant "counsel", but it may have been reinterpreted to have the religious meaning of "divine powers". The second element is *waldaz ("ruler").	In Ragnars saga loðbrókar, one of the sons of Ragnar and Aslaug^{1}. When his brothers Ivar the Boneless, Björn Ironside, Hvitserk attack the town of Hvítabœr, the brothers leave him to guard the ships considering him too young to fight. Ivar the Boneless who is carried on a shield kills the two dangerous sacred cows with his bow and arrow. Eager to join, Rognvald arrives with his part of the army, only to be killed, although his brothers win the battle. In Ad catalogum, a Raugnvaldus is reported to have died in adolescence in his brothers' army. Krákumál mentions a Rǫgnvaldr who died in the Hebrides but does not tell his age. In Gesta Danorum (IX), Saxo writes that Ragnar Lodbrok was victorious at Whiteby (Hvítabœr) in Scania, and comments later that Ragnar had a son named Regnaldus with Svanlaug (Aslaug), who like his brothers Withsercus and Ericus^{3} was too young to join his father's expedition against Sorlus who had succeeded Herrothus as the king of Sweden.		Ragnars saga loðbrókar, Ad catalogum regum Sveciæ annotanda, Krákumál, Gesta Danorum (IX)	
Rognvald the Tall/Russian/Redbeard (Radbard) or Radbard Fist	Old Norse: Rǫgnvaldr hávi, Rǫgnvaldr ráðbarðr, or Raðbarðr hnefi, Latin: Regnaldus rutenus		For Rognvald, see Rognvald above, and for Ráðbarðr, see Ráðbarðr, above. The cognomen hái means "the tall", and hnefi means "fist" or refers to a hnefatafl board game piece, but it may also be an alteration of nefi (nepos, "nephew"). In Gesta Danorum he has the cognomen rutenus ("Russian").	He appears in Sögubrot, at the massive Battle of Brávellir as one of the Swedish king Sigurd Ring's warriors in the battle against the Danish king Harald Wartooth. He is called "the greatest of all champions". When the battle began, Rognvald started fighting with Ubbi the Frisian and it is described as a great fight between two brave champions, but it ended with the death of Rognvald. He also appears in the Danish account of the battle (Gesta Danorum VIII) as Regnaldus ... Rathbarthi nepos ("Ráðbarð's nephew", see Ráðbarðr above) and a supporter of the Swedish king. In addition, the names Regnaldus and Rathbarthus appear as the names of sons of Ragnar Lodbrok by Thora and Suanlogha in Gesta Danorum IX.		Sögubrot, Gesta Danorum VIII and Gesta Danorum IX	
Rondhere				See Randver^{2}			
Rosamund	Latin: Rosamunda	The historical Rosamund, who was captured by Alboin c. 567.	The first element may be a form of PGmc *hrōþi ("fame") that has been adapted to Romance-language phonology, or it may be from PGmc *rausi- ("reed"). The second element is PGmc *munda ("protection).	Daughter of the Gepid king Cunimund. She marries the Lombard king Alboin after he has killed her father and is forced to drink for her father's skull. She later murders Alboin in his bed.	Historia Langobardorum		
Rotholf	Old Norse: Roðolfr	His name is reminiscent in form to that of Rother in the minstrel epic König Rother, who performs a similar abduction.	From Gmc hrōð-wulfs (famous wolf).	A vassal of Attila. When Attila is rebuffed in his wooing of Oserich/Osantrix's daughter Helche (Erka), Rotholf returns in disguise to Osantrix's court, remaining there for two winters before convincing Erka to flee with him and also abducts her sister Berta. Osantrix pins Rotholf in at the castle of Falstrskog, but Atli saves him with his army. Rotholf marries Berta.			Þiðreks saga
Rüdiger von Bechelaren	Middle High German: Rüedigêr von Bechelâren, Old Norse: Roðingeirr af Bakalar	Possibly Rodrigo Diaz de Vivar (El Cid), whose name has the same etymology and who was also an exile.	"Famous spear", first element PGmc *hrōþi- ("fame"). Second element Middle High German gêr ("spear"). See Hrothgar.	Exile and vassal of Attila. In the Nibelungenlied, he is a margrave. In Rabenschlacht, he intervenes with Attila and Helche for them to forgive Dietrich von Bern after the death of Attila's sons on campaign with Dietrich. In Biterolf und Dietleib, he and Biterolf lead Attila's forces against the Poles. In the Nibelungenlied, he brings Attila's suit for Kriemhild's hand in marriage and later escorts the Burgundians to Attila's castle, betrothing his daughter to Giselher. He attempts to stay out of the conflict with the Burgundians, but is eventually forced to intervene for Attila and Kriemhild and he and Gernot kill each other. In the Þiðreks saga he and Giselher kill each other instead.			Nibelungenlied, Þiðreks saga, Dietrichs Flucht, Rabenschlacht, Biterolf und Dietleib, Heldenbuch-Prosa
Rumelher	Middle High German: Rûmelher		Possibly based on MHG rumelen, rummelen ("to make a loud noise, to rumble").	In Wolfdietrich, the leader of a band of robbers whom Wolfdietrich encounters while on a pilgrimage to Jerusalem. They argue among themselves about how to apportion his possessions, but Wolfdietrich kills them all and states that they now each have an equal share.			Wolfdietrich
Rumolt	Middle High German: Rûmolt		First element probably OHG Rûma ("Rome"), but it might also be PGmc *hrōma- ("fame"). Second element PGmc *wald, related to OHG waltan ("to rule").	Official in charge of the Burgundians' kitchens (küchenmeister). He advises Gunther not to go to the Huns. Rumolt is left in charge when the Burgundians head to Attila's court. In the Nibelungenklage, he arranges for the coronation of Gunther's son.			Nibelungenlied, Nibelungenklage, Biterolf und Dietleib
Runze (Rütze, Rachin)	Middle High German: Runze, Rütze, or Rachin	Otto Luitpold Jiriczek suggested a connection to Runsa, a Tyrolean mountain spirit responsible for causing avalanches.	Rütze probably from MHG rütze/rüschen ("to slide"), Runze possibly from runse ("flowing water") or a term for a hideous woman from runze ("wrinkle").	A giantess who is killed by Ortnit. She is the aunt of Ecke.			Ortnit, Wolfdietrich, Eckenlied, Heldenbuch-Prosa
Ruodlieb	Latin: Ruodlieb, Middle High German: Ruotliep		The first element is PGmc *hrōthi("fame"). The second element is OHG liob ("dear").	In Ruodlieb, the hero captures a dwarf who ransoms himself with the treasure of Kings Immunch and Hartunch. He then kills both kings and marries the heiress to the treasure, Heriburg, as the dwarf prophesied and Ruodlieb's mother had foreseen in a dream. The dwarf ransoming himself with treasure is similar to a scene in the Þiðreks saga. In the Eckenlied, Ruodlieb is the original owner of Ecke's sword (Eckesachs) and has a son named Herbort.			Ruodlieb, Eckenlied

== S-Si ==
Figure	Names in medieval languages	Historical origin	Name meaning	Relationships	Early and English Attestations	Norse Attestations	German Attestations
Sabene^{1}	Middle High German: Sabene, possibly Old English: Seofola	Potentially a Germanization of the East Roman general Sabinianus Magnus.	Probably from PGmc *saba- ("understanding").	Son of the treacherous Sibeche and vassal of Ermanaric. In Dietrichs Flucht, Wolfhart captures and hangs him.	Possibly in Widsith		Dietrichs Flucht, Biterolf und Dietleib
Sabene^{2}	Middle High German: Sabene	The name is likely taken from Sabene^{1}, while the role resembles Sibeche and common figures in Old French chanson de geste.	See Sabene^{1}	In some versions of Wolfdietrich, Hugdietrich's treacherous counselor. He attempts to seduce Hugdietrich's wife while he is away fighting, tries to have the infant Wolfdietrich killed, and later incites Wolfdietrich's brothers against him.			Wolfdietrich (some versions)
Saevil	Old Norse: Sævil, Old English: Seafola, Latin: Sevillus	Probably based on Sabene^{1}	Probably based on Sabene^{1}	A jarl who aids the boys Hroar (Hrothgar) and Helgi (Halga) take revenge on their uncle Fróði and is married to their sister Signy and is the father of Hrok.^{3}.	Widsith	Skjöldunga saga, Hrólfs saga kraka	
Samson^{1}	Old Norse: Samson		According to Jiriczek and Gillespie, the name probably derives from Old French chanson de geste, and ultimately refers to the biblical Samson. William Paff instead suggests an origin in ON samr ("black").	In the Þiðreks saga, the father of Ermanaric and Dietmar. He kidnaps Hildisvid, the daughter of earl Rodingeir of Salerno. He conquers several kingdoms.			Þiðreks saga
Samson^{2}	Old Norse: Samson		See Samson^{1}.	In the Þiðreks saga, the third son of Ermanaric. Sifka (Sibeche) accuses him of raping his daughter, which causes Ermanaric to kill him in a rage.			Þiðreks saga
Særeid	Old Norse: Særeiðr		According to Jónsson, the name is a doublet of Sinrjóð, and -reiðr can mean "ready, clear" while -rjóð means "clearing". The first element Sæ- means "sea" or "lake", but according to Peterson sin- may mean "(strong) sinew" and analyses of continental Germanic names having Sin- don't seem relevant for Scandinavian names.	In Helgakvíða Hjörvarðssonar, Særeid is one of four wives of Hjörvard^{4}, a king in Norway. With Alfhild^{2} he had son named Hedin, with Særeid a son named Humlung, and with Sinriód a son named Hymling. Helgakviða Hjörvarðssonar deals with how he won his fourth wife, Sigrlinn, the daughter of king Svafnir of Svavaland, and the story of their son Helgi Hjörvarðsson.		Helgakviða Hjörvarðssonar	
Saxi	Old Norse: Saxi		The name Saxi means "Saxon" (an ethnonym), or "Seax", a kind of short sword.	In Guðrúnarkvíða III, Saxi is a German lord who is summoned to bless a boiling kettle where Gudrun will successfully immerse her hands in a trial by ordeal by hot water, in order to dispel the rumours that she has been unfaithful to her husband Atli (Atilla).		Guðrúnarkvíða III	
Saxi flettir	Old Norse: Saxi flettir		For the name Saxi see above. The cognomen flettir means "stripper" or "plunderer".	In the Ynglinga saga, the Swedish king Ingjald sends his son Olof Trätälja to be raised by his queen Gauthild's foster-father Bóvi in Västergötland. Bóvi's son Saxi flettir thus becomes Olof's foster-brother. Saxi also appears at the Battle of Brávellir in the Skjöldunga saga, and in Gesta Danorum as one of Sigurd Ring's warriors. Finlay & Faulkes (2016), comment that as Saxi also appears chronologically later, in the Battle of Brávellir, his original relation with the Swedish queen must have been the reverse.		Ynglinga saga, Af Uplendinga konungum, Skjöldunga saga, Gesta Danorum	
Sceafthere	Old English: Sceafthere		The name means "spear army".	Appears in Widsith, line 32 as the king of the Ymbran. Nothing else is known about him.	Widsith		
Schilbung	Middle High German: Schilbunc		The name is cognate with the OE and ON dynastic names Scylfing/Skilfingr. It may derive from the equivalent of OE scylfe ("shelf, ledge"), possibly meaning "rock- or cave-man", or it might derive from the equivalents of OE scelfan, ON scjalfa ("to shake, tremble") giving a meaning "frostman".	A giant, one of two sons of Nibelung^{1}. He and his brother quarrel over their father's inheritance and ask for Siegfried's help. When he divides the treasure evenly, they grow angry and attack him. Siegfried kills them both and takes the treasure.			Nibelungenlied
Scilling	Old English: Scilling		The name is from PGmc *skillingaz ("gold coin").	Appears in Widsith, line 103 as a scop who sang at the same time as the poet Widsith, like the two minstrels who performed together for Attila. The name may possibly instead refer to Widsith's harp.	Widsith		
Seburg	Middle High German: Sêburc	Possibly connected to a popular tradition of three weather witches who dwell on the mountain of Jochgrimm in South Tyrol.	From PGmc *saiwi-burʒz, where *saiwiz means "lake, sea, marshland" and *burʒz means "fortified place".	One of three queens at Jochgrimm - she equips the giant Ecke with the armor of Wolfdietrich and sends him out to seek Dietrich von Bern for her. In one version of the poem, Dietrich later casts Ecke's severed head at her feet.			Eckenlied
Secca	Old English: Secca	A historical relative of Theuderic I.	A hypocoristic form of a name beginning with Sig- ("victory"), with the addition of a k-suffix, i.e. from *Sigko.	Appears in Widsith, line 115 and is identified by Malone with Sigiwald (Sicco), a relative of the Frankish king Theuderic I.	Widsith		
Sibeche (Bikki)	Old Norse: Bikki or Sifka (Þiðreks saga), Middle High German: Sibeche, possibly Old English: Sifeca, Becca	Uncertain origin.	According to George Gillespie, probably from PGmc *saba- ("understanding") or seb ("kinship"), as also derived by Ernst Wilhelm Förstemann. The Norse form Bikki, from Saxon Bicco, is a hypocoristic form of LG *Sibiko and may be influenced by the masculine counterpart to ON bikkja ("bitch").	Counselor of Ermanaric, through whose machinations Ermanaric kills his nephews (the Harlungen) and/or son (Randver) and wife, Svanhildr. In Dietrichs Flucht, he incites Ermanaric to attack the Harlungen and Dietrich. In Rabenschlacht, Eckehart captures him and ties him naked across a saddle. The Heldenbuch-Prosa and Þiðreks saga present his treachery as revenge for Ermanaric's rape of Sibeche's wife: he seeks to destroy Ermanaric by giving him bad advice. In the Norse tradition, he encourages Ermanaric's son Randver to sleep with Ermanaric's new wife Svanhildr, then informs Ermanaric of the adultery.	In Widsith, as Becca, and possibly as Sifeca but this figure may be Sifka from Hervarar saga.	Ragnarsdrápa, Guðrúnarhvöt, Hamðismál, Gesta Danorum, Skáldskaparmál, Völsunga saga.	Þiðreks saga, Dietrichs Flucht, Rabenschlacht, Heldenbuch-Prosa.
Sifka	Old Norse: Sifka, possibly Old English: Sifeca		See Sibeche.	Daughter of Humli, abductee of Heidrek, mother of Hlöd. Heidrek kills her by taking her to a river where he breaks her backbone and lets her drift downstream.	Possibly in Widsith, but the name there is the name of a man (see Sibeche).	Hervarar saga	
Siegfried von Moorland	Middle High German: Sîfrit von Môrlant	Possibly Sigfred, a Danish Viking defeated by Emperor Charles the Fat in 882.	See Sigurd/Siegfried for etymology.	King of the Moors and a failed suitor for Kudrun. His attack distracts Hetel and Herwig so that Ludwig and Hartmut are able to abduct her. His role as king of the Moors likely from the fact that he was not Christian (with Moor as a synonym for heathen).			Kudrun
Sigar^{1}	Old Norse: Sigarr, Old English: Sighere, Latin: Sigarus	Probably a historic king from the first half of the 5th c.	The name was originally PN *Sigiharjaz, where the first element is from *segi- ("victory") and the second element *-harjaz is the same as Gothic harjis ("host").	Sigar is mainly known for killing his daughter Signy^{1}'s lover Hagbard^{1}. In Gesta Danorum, Hagbard^{1} came to Sigar's court in Zealand where he fell in love with Signy^{1}. However, animosity with her brothers forced him to meet her dressed as a woman. They were revealed by a handmaid and Hagbard^{1} was sentenced to death. Hagbard^{1} asked the hangman to hang his coat in the gallows to see what he would look like which was granted. When Signy saw this she set her home on fire and perished with all her maids, and when Hagbard^{1} saw this he was happy to join her in death. Hagbard^{1}'s brother Haki^{1} avenged his brother by slaying Sigar. Sigar is also mentioned with Hagbard^{1} and Háki^{1} in Völsunga saga, and he appears as Sighere in Widsith. The legend was so widely known that Sigar is mentioned in skaldic kennings for the gallows.	Widsith (line 28)	Gesta Danorum (VII), Völsunga saga (XXV), Haleygjatal (4), Haraldsdrápa (3), Erfidrápa Óláfs Helga (1)	
Sigar^{2}	Old Norse: Sigarr		See Sigar^{1}.	Helgi Hjörvardsson's servant, who he sent to ask Sváfa to come to him before he died.		Helgakvíða Hjörvarðssonar (stanza 37)	
Sigar^{3}	Old Norse: Sigarr		See Sigar^{1}.	The brother of Högni^{3}, who is the father of Sigrún.		Helgakvíða Hundingsbana II (stanza 4), Guðrúnarkvíða II (stanza 16)	
Sigeband	Middle High German: Sigebant		The first element is sigu ("victory"), from PGmc *seguz or *segaz. The second element means "bond", from PGmc *bandan.	The king of Ireland, he marries a Norwegian princess and fathers Hagen/Högni^{2}. He also appears among Ermanaric's men in the Rabenschlacht.			Kudrun, Rabenschlacht
Sigeferth	Old English: Sigeferð, Old English: Sǣferð		First element is from PGmc *sigi- ("victory"), and the second element is PGmc *-frið ("peace"). The first element sǣ- (in Sǣferð) means "sea" or "lake" from *saiwiz or *saiwaz.	A warrior from the Secgan tribe in the northern coast of Germany, and probably the same character as Sǣferð of the Sycgan in Widsith 31. He fights alongside Eaha on the side of the Jutes defending a door against the Frisians and proclaims that he is a "widely known hero (who has) survived many woes, many hard battles".	Finnsburg Fragment, Widsith		
Sigelint^{1}				See Hjördís/Sieglinde			
Sigelint^{2}				See Hadeburg and Sieglinde.			
Sigenot	Middle High German: Sigenôt		First element PGmc *sigu ("victory), second element PGmc *nauðiz ("need, difficulty, distress").	A giant and nephew of the giants Hilde and Grim, from whom Dietrich took his helmet Hildegrim. He takes Dietrich captive after Dietrich kicks him while he is sleeping. He also captures Hildebrand^{1}, but Dietrich eventually is able to escape and kill him.			Sigenot
Sigestab	Middle High German: Sigestap		First element PGmc *sigu ("victory), second element is stab ("staff"). from PGmc *stab- ("staff").	The son of Amelung and brother of Wolfhart, thus Hildebrand^{1}'s nephew. He is killed by Volker in the Nibelungenlied.			Nibelungenlied, Alpharts Tod, Rosengarten zu Worms, Virginal, Heldenbuch-Prosa
Sigi	Old Norse: Sigi		The name is from sigr which means "victory".	Odin's son Sigi went on a deer hunting trip accompanied by a thrall named Bredi, but when they collected the deer Bredi had killed both more and bigger deer than him. He was so upset by being outdone by a lesser man than him that he murdered the thrall and hid him in a snowdrift, after which he told Bredi's master Skadi that the thrall had disappeared. Skadi did not believe him and after a search they found Bredi in the snow. Skadi had Sigi banished for murder, but Odin gave him several warships that Sigi used successfully for pillaging until he ended up as the ruler of the Huns (but in the Prose Edda of the Franks), and the father of a young man named Rerir who was fostered at home. When Rerir was away and Sigi only had a smaller force, his jealous brothers-in-law took advantage of it and killed him. He was an ancestor of the Völsungs.		Völsunga saga, Prologue to Prose Edda	
Siggeir	Old Norse: Siggeirr		The name Siggeirr is derived from the first element sig-, from *seʒiz or *seʒuz ("victory") and the second element geirr ("spear").	Siggeir, the king of the Geats, was betrothed to Signy, but he was offended when Odin brought her father Völsung a sword and Signy's twin Sigmund was the only one who could pull out the sword from the tree Barnstokkr where Odin had inserted it. Siggeir invited Völsung and his sons to visit him, and then had Völsung killed. He agreed to Signy's request that he only put her brothers in stocks, but Sigmund got away alive. The two twins killed two of his sons in the forest, and had an incestuous affair resulting in Sinfjötli who killed two of other children of his. He punished Sigmund and Sinfjötli by burying them alive in a mound, but they escaped and set his hall on fire in the night. His wife Signy joined him in the hall to perish with him in the flames.		Völsunga saga, Skáldskaparmál, Helgakvíða hundingsbana I, Guðrúnarkvíða II (stanza 16)	
Sigmund	Old English: Sigemund, Old Norse: Sigmundr, Middle High German: Sigemunt	Potentially connected to king Sigismund of Burgundy (died 524).	"Victory-protection", first element PGmc *sigi- ("victory"), second element PGmc *-mundō ("protection").	Son of Völsung in Norse and Old English tradition, father of Sigurd/Siegfried. In Beowulf, he is said to have slain a dragon. In the Nibelungenlied, he abdicates in favor of Siegfried and accompanies him to Worms at the time of his murder. In Lied vom Hürnen Seyfrid, he banished the unrulely Siegfried from his court. In the Norse tradition, Sigmund survives the murder of his brothers by king Siggeir, who is marries to his sister Signy. Signy changes shapes and sleeps with Sigmund, producing the son Sinfjötli, with whom Sigmund takes revenge for his family's murder. Sigmund then marries Borghild^{1} and has two sons, Helgi and Hamundr. When Borghild^{1} poisons Sinfjötli for killing her brother, he divorces her and marries Hjördís, but is mortally wounded fighting Lyngvi, a failed suitor for Hjördís. Posthumously, his son Sigurd is born.	Beowulf	Grípisspá, Skáldskaparmál, Völsunga saga, Norna-Gests þáttr, frequently mentioned as father of Sigurd in the Poetic Edda.	Nibelungenlied, Þiðreks saga, Lied vom Hürnen Seyfrid, Heldenbuch-Prosa.
Sigmund Sigurdsson (Gunther^{2})	Old Norse: Sigmundr Sigurðsson, Middle High German: Gunther		See Sigmund, above and Gunther/Gunnar^{1}	Sigmund was Sigurd's son with Gudrun. He is only three years old when Brynhild has him killed and put on her own pyre together with eight male thralls, five female thralls and the body of Sigurd's killer Gutthorm^{1}. In the Nibelungenlied, Kriemhild allows Siegfried's father Siegmund to take her and Siegfried's son Gunther back to Xanten with him.		Völsunga saga	Nibelungenlied
Signy^{1}	Old Norse: Signýr, Latin: Sygne		The first element is from PGmc *seʒiz or *seʒuz ("victory") and the second element from ON nýr ("new").	Hagbard^{1} sees Signy in a dream, but he is at war with her brothers so he lets his hair grow and dresses in woman clothes. He finds occupation as a crafts teacher at her father king Sigar's court and gets to teach her. After a while she discovers that he is her love from her dreams. They are disclosed and at the gallows he asks to have his coat hanged first to see how he would look. When Signy misinterpretes the sight as his hanging she sets her bower ablaze and perishes. Seeing it, Hagbard^{1} dies happily in the hangman's noose, knowing how much she loved him.		Gesta Danorum (VII), Ynglingatal (9) Habor och Signhild	
Signy^{2}	Old Norse: Signýr		See Signy^{1}	Signy and her twin brother Sigmund were among the 10 children of Völsung and the Valkyrie Hljod. When Signy was betrothed to king Siggeir, the king of the Geats, the latter was offended when Odin brought Völsung a sword and not him. Signy's twin Sigmund was the only one who could pull out the sword from the tree Barnstokkr where Odin had inserted it. Siggeir treacherously invited Völsung and his sons to visit him, then had Völsung killed. Signy prevailed on Siggeir to only put her brothers in stocks, after which Siggeir's mother ate one of the brothers each night in wolf form. By putting honey in her last brother Sigmund's mouth, he managed to kill her by biting off her tongue. Signy's children with Siggeir were deemed to cowardly to help them, and so they killed them. Signy temporarily changed shapes with a female shaman and had sex with her brother resulting in Sinfjötli who was deemed bold enough. When Sinfjötli had grown up he killed Signy's remaining children with Siggeir as well. When Sigmund and Sinfjötli had been captured and buried alive, she rescued them, but when they set Siggeir's hall on fire, she went into the hall to join her hated husband and perish with him in the flames.		Völsunga saga	
Signy^{3}	Old Norse: Signýr, Latin: Signya	The name may be borrowed from Signy^{2}, because the name of the original character may be lost.	See Signy^{1}	The sister of the Scylding kings Hrothgar and Halga and wife of Sævil. She encourages her son Hrok to demand compensation for her husband's help against their uncle Fróði. While, Hrólfs saga kraka does not tell where Sævil is the ruler, the older Skjöldinga saga informs that it is Zealand. In the Beowulf manuscript, her name has been lost in line 62, and Kluge (1896) suggested that it would have been Signeow, but this has not been mentioned much since then. Clarke (1911) proposed instead that the name of their sister was Yrsa, and Malone agreed and considered Signý to be a name borrowed from Völsunga saga, and most scholars have accepted that the character originally was Yrsa in Beowulf.	Beowulf	Hrólfs saga kraka, Skjöldunga saga	
Sigrdrífa	Old Norse: Sigrdrífa	Probably a late mythical development of the Nordic Nibelungen material.	The name means "driver to victory", a kenning for Valkyrie.	A sleeping Valkyrie awakened by Sigurd. She is probably identical with Brunhild; the prose author may have misunderstood a kenning for Valkyrie for a name.		Fáfnismál Sigrdrífumál	
Sigrid	Old Norse: Sigríðr, Latin: Syritha		The first element sigr is from PGmc *seʒiz or *seʒuz, and means "victory", while the second element -frīðr means "beautiful" and "beloved"	In the Skjöldunga saga, she is the wife of Halfdanus (Healfdene) and the mother of Hroar (Hrothgar) and Helgi (Halga). Halfdanus brother Ingjalldus (Ingeld) was jealous and killed him and took Sigrid for himself, and they had the sons Raerecus and Frodo. Halfdanus' and Sigrid's sons Hroar and Helgi were brought up in secret and would later avenge their father, while their daughter Signya married Sevillus of Zealand. In Hrólfs saga kraka, Halfdan's brother and murderer is instead named Fróði, and she refuses to leave Fróði when her sons set the hall on fire and she dies with him. In Gesta Danorum, both Halfdan and Sigrid (Syritha) have been duplicated. Both Syritha are closely related to Sigar^{1}, but one of them did not marry Halfdan, although they had a sexual relationship and Halfdan intervened to stop her marriage with a low-born suitor. This Halfdan later married a Guritha (which may be a misspelling of Syritha) after having intervened at her marriage and killed the groom.		Skjöldunga saga, Hrólfs saga kraka, Bjarkarímur, Gesta Danorum	
Sigrid the Haughty	Old Norse: Sigríðr stórráða, Latin: Syritha		See Sigrid, above.	She was the widow of Eric the Victorious, and the mother of Olof Skötkonung. She received her name because she burnt two suitors (including Harald Grenske, the father of Olaf II of Norway) to death inside her hall, to intimidate other little kings from wooing her.		Hervarar saga, Gesta Danorum (X), Óláfs saga Tryggvasonar	
Sigrlinn	Old Norse: Sigrlinn		The same name as the Old High German Sigilind, see Hjördis/Sieglinde, above.	In Helgakvíða Hjörvarðssonar, Sigrlinn is the most beautiful woman and the daughter of king Svafnir of Svavaland. Hjörvard^{4} wants to marry her and sent Atli^{2}, the son of his jarl Idmund, to negotiate with Svafnir, but Franmar, the girl's foster-father advises against it. Franmar had previously appeared to Atli in the form of a bird demanding and exorbitant price for her. Hjörvard and Atli ride to Svavaland and find it being invaded and pillaged by Sigrlinn's second suitor Hrodmar who has already killed Svafnir. Atli marries Alof^{1} while Hjörvard marries Sigrlinn with whom he has the son Helgi Hjörvardsson, the hero of Helgakvíða Hjörvarðssonar, who later avenges Svafnir, his maternal grandfather, by killing Hrodmar.		Helgakvíða Hjörvarðssonar	
Sigrun	Old Norse: Sigrún		The first element is from PGmc *seʒiz or *seʒuz ("victory") and the second element is an agent noun meaning "she who possesses secret knowledge".	A valkyrie, wife of Helgi Hundingsbane. She is first betrothed to Hothbrodd against her will, so Helgi declares war on Hothbrodd, his father Granmar, and Sigrún's father Högni^{3}. Helgakviða Hundingsbana I tells that when Helgi's ships have trouble arriving because of the high seas, she protects the ships from above, and Helgakviða Hundingsbana II has her protect Helgi and his warriors during the battle. In the Völsunga saga, she shows Helgi's ships a safe harbour, and during the battle she and her Valkyries shine so that it was like looking into a fire. Helgakviða Hundingsbana II also deals with Helgi's death by the hands of her brother Dag, how she cursed her brother, and how Helgi came to visit her in his grave mound, for one last night of love. The lay adds that she soon died from sadness. The Helgi lays also mention an uncle named Sigar^{3}.		Helgakviða Hundingsbana I, Helgakviða Hundingsbana II, Völsunga saga	
Sigurd/Siegfried	Old Norse: Sigurðr, Middle High German: Sîfrit, later Seyfrid	Disputed, possibly Sigibert I.	First element of both names from PGmc *sigi- ("victory"). In German, second element PGmc *-frið ("peace"). In Norse, name derives via PN *Sigivǫrðr from West Germanic *Sigiward, with second element *-ward ("guardian").	Son of Sigmund, husband of Gudrun/Kriemhild. In the Nibelungenlied, Siegfried comes to Worms to win Kriemhild's hand. He helps the Burgundians including helping Gunther woo Brunhild, using his cloak of invisibility to take Gunther's shape. When Brunhild discovers this, she incites Hagen/Högni to murder Siegfried with Gunther's agreement. In the Lied vom Hürnen Seyfrid, Siegfried is raised by a smith who sends him into the forest to be eaten by a dragon: instead, Siegfried kills the dragons (pl.) and bathes in their skin, receiving an impenetrable skin. He also rescues Kriemhild. In Rosengarten zu Worms, Kriemhild arranges for him to fight against Dietrich von Bern in a tournament, which he loses. In the Norse tradition, Sigurd is sent to kill the dragon Fafnir by his foster-father the dwarf Reginn; Sigurd kills the dragon and then Reginn when he learns the latter will betray him. He encounters and swears to marry Brunhild, but is given a potion of forgetfulness by Gudrun's mother, Grimhild, and marries Gudrun. Later, Brunhild instigates his murder.		Frá dauða Sinfjötla, Grípisspá, Reginsmál, Fáfnismál, Sigrdrífumál, Brot af Sigurðarkviðu, Guðrúnarkviða I, Sigurðarkviða hin skamma, Skáldskaparmál Völsunga Saga, Norna-Gests þáttr	Nibelungenlied, Þiðreks saga, Rosengarten zu Worms, Lied vom Hürnen Seyfrid
Sigurd Hart	Old Norse: Sigurðr hjǫrtr		For etymology, see Sigurd/Siegfried. In Óláfs saga Tryggvasonar, Snorri Sturluson explains that the cognomen Hart (hjǫrtr) was given to very fast men.	Sigurd hart was a king of Ringerike, and his father was Helgi the Sharp and his mother Aslaug^{2}, the daughter of Sigurd Snake-in-the-Eye, the son of Ragnar Lodbrok. When Sigurd Hart was only twelve, he killed the berserker Hildibrand^{4} and eleven other warriors in the same fight. He had two children, Guthormr^{2} and a splendid daughter named Ragnhild who was twenty years old. When Sigurd was out hunting in Hadeland, he was attacked by the berserker Haki^{4} and 30 of his men. Sigurd killed twelve of Haki^{4}'s men and cut off one of his arms before he was killed. Haki^{4} and his men then rode to Sigurd's home and took Sigurd's children captive.		Hálfdanar saga svarta, Ragnarssona þáttr	
Sigurd Ring	Old Norse: Sigurðr Hringr, Hringr, Latin: Siuardus Ring, Ringo	The Battle of Brávellir may reflect battles in the fifth and sixth centuries between Danes and Swedes.	For etymology, see Sigurd/Siegfried.	In the Norse sagas, he was a kinsman of Harald Wartooth who ruled in both Sweden and Denmark. When Harald was old, he appointed Sigurd the king of Sweden Proper and Västergötland. Wanting to die gloriously, Harald challenged Sigurd to the massive Battle of Brávellir on the plains of Östergötland. On Harald's side there were men from Denmark and the Baltic countries, and on Sigurd's men from Sweden Proper, Västergötland and what today is Norway. Sigurd was victorious, and ruled large parts of Scandinavia until he was severely wounded in battle, and died on a burning ship laden with his fallen men. Sigurd was married to Alfhild, the princess of Alfheimr, and they were the parents of Ragnar Lodbrok. In Gesta Danorum, the author Saxo forgets about Ringo, who won the battle, and much later he returns to Siuardus Ring as the father of Ragnar Lodbrok.		Gesta Danorum, Chronicon lethrense, Skjöldunga saga, Ragnars saga loðbrókar, Hervarar saga, Sögubrot af nokkrum fornkonungum, Norna-Gests þáttr, Orvar-Odd's saga (younger version), Gríms saga loðinkinna	
Sigurd Snake-in-the-Eye	Old Norse: Sigurðr ormr í auga, Latin: Sigvardus serpentinus oculus, Latin: Sywardus serpentini oculi	The Danish king Sigfred, active around Metz in 873.	See Sigurd/Siegfried.	In Ragnars saga loðbrókar, the last son of Ragnar Lodbrok and Aslaug^{1} after Ivar the Boneless, Björn Ironside and Rognvald. His mother bears him with a snake in his eye to prove that she is the daughter of Sigurd, so he will not marry a Swedish princess instead. He learns of the death of their father at the hands of king Ælla of Northumbria and presumably takes part in the invasion of England to avenge him. His daughter was Ragnhild, the mother of Harald Fairhair. In Ragnarssona Þáttr and Ad catalogum, the same parents and brothers are mentioned, and in the first source, he is said to have died in the Battle of Leuven (891). In Ragnars saga loðbrókar, he is said to have a kingdom, and in Ragnarssona Þáttr this is specified as Zealand, Scania, Halland and Viken, and he was married to Blaeja, king Ælla's daughter with whom he had the twins Hordaknut and Aslaug^{2} (the mother of Ragnhild who was the mother of Harald Fairhair). In Gesta Danorum (IX), he is the son of Ragnar with Thora and the brother of Rathbarthus, Dunwatus, Biornus, Agnerus (Agnar^{4}) and Ivarus. There he receives his cognomen from having received a cure for his wounds that resulted in small snakes in his irises. He takes over his father's kingdom after his death.		Ragnars saga loðbrókar, Ad catalogum regum Sveciæ annotanda, Ragnarssona Þáttr, Gesta Danorum (IX)	
Sigvarðr	Old Norse: Sigvarðr		A variant of the name Sigurðr, see Sigurd for etymology.	In Historia Norwegiæ, Sigvarðr kills his brother the Swedish king Anund. Snorri Sturluson did not mention him in Ynglinga saga, but included a part of his source Ynglingatal which says that Anund's death was by "the bitter hatred of a bastard's wrath", and this "bastard" probably refers to Anund's brother Sigvarðr.		Historia Norwegiæ, Ynglingatal	
Sigverk of Attundaland	Old Norse: Sigverkr konungr af Áttundalandi	Possibly historical.	The first element is sig-, from *seʒiz or *seʒuz ("victory"), and verkr means "pain".	As the petty king of Attundaland, he was invited together with a number of other petty kings by the Swedish king Ingjald ill-ruler to a feast at Uppsala, but at night the doors were barred and he hall set on fire, burning everyone inside to death. After this Ingjald expanded his realm.		Ynglinga saga	
Sinfjötli	Old English: Fitela, Old Norse: Sinfjötli. In Old High German, an equivalent personal name Sintarvizzilo is attested.		May be based on the equivalents of OHG sintar ("cinder") and fezzil ("fetlock"), meaning "Bright-foot" and a kenning for wolf.	In Beowulf, he is the nephew of Sigmund. In the Norse tradition, Sigmund's son through incest with his sister Signy. He is fathered in order to avenge the destruction of their family by king Siggeir. At one point, both father and son are cursed to wander as wolves, but they eventually kill Siggeir. He is poisoned by Sigmund's wife Borghild^{1} after he has killed her brother in a dispute over a woman.	Beowulf	Frá dauða Sinfjötla, Skáldskaparmál, Völsunga saga, Norna-Gests þáttr	
Sinrjod	Old Norse: Sinrjóð		According to Jónsson, the name is a doublet of Særeiðr, and -reiðr can mean "ready, clear" while -rjóð means "clearing". The first element Sæ- means "sea" or "lake", but according to Peterson sin- may mean "(strong) sinew" and analyses of continental Germanic names having Sin- don't seem relevant for Scandinavian names.	In Helgakvíða Hjörvarðssonar, Sinrjod is one of four wives of Hjörvard^{4}, a king in Norway. With Alfhild^{2} he had son named Hedin, with Særeid a son named Humlung, and with Sinriód a son named Hymling. Helgakviða Hjörvarðssonar deals with how he won his fourth wife, Sigrlinn, the daughter of king Svafnir of Svavaland, and the story of their son Helgi Hjörvarðsson.		Helgakviða Hjörvarðssonar	
Sintram	Middle High German: Sintram, Old Norse: Sintram or Old Norse: Sistram		The first element is PGmc *sintha ("way, going, military campaign"), the second element is -ram, from -ramn, a contraction of PGmc *hraban ("raven").	In the German language sources, one of Attila's vassals. In the Þiðreks saga, he is the son of Reginbaldr of Venice, who is Hildebrand^{1}'s father, and is freed from the jaws of a dragon by Dietrich von Bern and Fasolt (see also Rentwin in Virginal). His grandfather Baltram appears as his brother in some later Swiss sources, whom he frees alive from the belly of a dragon.			Nibelungenklage, Þiðreks saga, Dietrichs Flucht, Rabenschlacht, Biterolf und Dietleib

== Sk-Sw ==
Figure	Names in medieval languages	Historical origin	Name meaning	Relationships	Early and English Attestations	Norse Attestations	German Attestations
Skadi	Old Norse: Skaði	It was also the name goddess/giantess, so it has been suggested that the account of Skaði and Breði is based on a lost Norse myth.	Skaði means "harm, damage" from PGmc *skaþōn, but it is also explained as derived from a word for "ski", "snowshoe".	Skadi was a powerful man who had a very able thrall named Bredi who was even more able than some men who were higher in station that he was. However, Bredi accompanied Odin's son Sigi on a deer hunting trip and when they collected the deer Bredi had killed both more and bigger deer than Sigi. The latter was so upset by being outdone by a lesser man than him that he murdered the thrall and hid him in a snowdrift, after which he claimed that Bredi had disappeared. Skadi did not believe him and after a search they found Bredi in the snow. Skadi had Sigi banished for the murder, and named the snowdrift after his thrall.		Völsunga saga	
Skjalf	Old Norse: Skjálf		The name is derived from *skelbō(n) meaning "shelf" or "seat", and it was one of the names of the goddess Freyja.	In Ynglingatal stanza 10, Skjalf appears and is presented by Snorri Sturluson in the prose of Ynglinga saga as a Finnish or sámi princess, abducted together with her brother Logi from their father Frosti by the Swedish king Agne. However, the original Ynglingatal stanza only presents her as loga dís, a disputed kenning that may mean the "goddess of marriage". Ynglingatal and Ynglinga saga agree with Historia Norwegiæ (also based on Ynglingatal) in telling that Skjalf hanged her husband Agni. The Swedish king Agne's descendants are called Scylfings in Beowulf, and the dynasty could be named after Skjalf, i.e. the goddess Freyja, providing a female parallel to the fact that the dynasty is otherwise named after her brother Freyr (Yngvi), the Ynglings. Also Historia Norwegiæ presents his ancestor Domalde as sacrificed to the goddess of fertility "Ceres", probably Freyja. In addition, Adam of Bremen mentions human sacrifice by hanging in the sacred grove at Uppsala without mentioning to whom, see Dísablót (goddess sacrifice).		Ynglingatal (10), Ynglinga saga, Historia Norwegiæ, Gautreks saga	
Skjöldr	Old English: Scyld Scefing, Old English: Sceldva Old Norse: Skjǫldr, Latin: Scioldus	Probably an idealized, legendary figure. The real founder of the Danish line of kings appears to have been Halfdan Scylding.	Derived from OE Scyld/ON skjöldr ("shield"), possibly in a poetic meaning such as "protector".	Founder of the Scylding dynasty. In Beowulf it is related that he arrived in Scania as a child in a boat without oars, but full of weapons. In other sources, this is told instead of a personage named Sheaf, which was probably the original version. In Scandinavian sources, he was the son of Odin and the ancestor of the Skjöldungs, in Denmark, while his brother Ingo became the ancestor of the Yngling dynasty in Sweden. In Beowulf, Scyld is only mentioned as Beow's father, and in Anglo-Saxon genealogies, he is only mentioned as the man between Beav and Sceaf.	Beowulf, Anglo-Saxon genealogies	Skjöldunga saga	
Skjöldr of Varna	Old Norse: Skjǫldr		See Skjöldr, above	In Ynglinga saga, Skjöldr was the chieftain of Varna (formerly a part of Østfold) and a skilled warlock. When Halfdan Whiteshanks of Vestfold pillaged in his territory, he arrived to the shore and saw the departing ships, Skjöldr took his cloak and blew into it after waving it around. When Eystein's ships rounded Jarlsø, he was sitting at the rudder and another ship came so close that a boom knocked him overboard.		Ynglinga saga	
Skuld	Old Norse: Skuldr		From PGmc *skulđiz ("debt").	The half-elven half-sister of Hrolf kraki who married Hereoweard, and who conspired with him to betray Hrolfr. They postponed the yearly tribute for three years, and when they finally came with the wagons full of tribute, the wagons were instead hiding armed warriors. In the ensuing battle both Hrolfr and Hereweard were killed. Skuld took over and ruled badly for some time until Vöggr^{1} returned with army raised with the assistance of Yrsa and Bödvar's brothers Thorir and Elgfroði, and defeated her.		Hrólfs saga kraka, Sköldunga saga, Gesta Danorum, Chronicon Lethrense and Annales Lundenses	
Skúr	Old Norse: Skúr, Latin: Skura		The name means "shower".	A daughter of Hrólfr kraki, and sister of Drífa^{2}. Her father gives her away to the Swedish giant-slayer and warrior Hvítserkr^{1}, while her sister is given to Bödvar Bjarki.		Hrólfs saga kraka, Skjöldunga saga	
Slagfiðr	Old Norse: Slagfiðr	If the OHG etymology is correct, the name may have originally been an epithet of Wayland the Smith's when flying.	Heiko Uecker writes that name is probably of West Germanic origin, comparing it to OHG slagi-federa ("beat-feather"). Other scholars hold the second element to be a form of ON finnr ("Finnic").	The brother of Wayland the Smith and Egil^{1}. He marries the Valkyrie and swan maiden Svanhvit. After she leaves him seven years later, he goes to look for her.		Völundarkviða	
Snaevar	Old Norse: Snævarr		The first element is snær ("snow"), from PN *snaiwaʀ. The second element -varr is of uncertain origin. It can be an agent noun derived from PGmc *warōn ("be watchful"), from PGmc *warjan ("protect"), or both, but it can also be a reinterpretation of the second syllable in names such as Bǫðvarr, Ingvarr and Sǣvarr where the v is properly part of the first element.	The son of Högni^{1} and Kostbera, and the brother of Solar. In Atlamál, they go with their father Högni, paternal uncle Gunnar and maternal uncle Orkning to visit their aunt Gudrun and her husband (Attila), a visit that will end with their death. Dráp Niflunga adds a third brother named Gjuki.		Dráp Niflunga, Atlamál, Völsunga saga (38)	
Solar	Old Norse: Sólarr		The first element Sól means "the Sun" who was a goddess. The second element -arr can have three different origins: *-harjaʀ ("war chief, warrior"), *-warjaʀ ("defender") or *-ʒaiʀaʀ ("spear").	A son of the hero Högni^{1} and the brother of Snaevar. In Atlamál, the two brothers go with their father Högni and their uncle Gunnar to their fateful visit at the fortress of Atli (Attila), who was married to their aunt Gudrun. They were also accompanied by the great warrior Orkning who was their uncle through their mother Kostbera. Dráp Niflunga adds a third brother named Gjuki.		Dráp Niflunga, Atlamál, Völsunga saga (38)	
Sölve	Old Norse: Sǫlvi		The name Sǫlvi is the definite form of the adjective sǫlr which means "sallow".	Sölvi was the son of Högni of Nærøy and had established a reign on Jutland, and pillaged in the east. He killed the Swedish king Eysteinn by burning him to death when he was at a banquet in Lófund (probably Lovön) and then he went to Old Sigtuna and declared that he was king of Sweden. After a battle, he ruled over Sweden for some time before the Swedes rebelled, and put Eystein's son Ingvar Harra on the throne. Sölvi's men were Jutes in the Ynglinga saga but Geats in Historia Norwegiæ.		Historia Norwegiæ, Ynglinga saga, Hálfs saga ok Hálfsrekka	
Sörli	Old Norse: Sǫrli, Latin: Sarus (Getica) or Serilus (Annals of Quedlinburg)	Not historical.	The name forms are based on PGmc *sarwa- meaning "armor". The ON version originates in a form with a diminutive suffix, like OHG Sarulo and Sarilo.	In the Norse tradition, Hamdir and Sörli are sons of Gudrun, and the half-brothers of Svanhildr (through their mother Gudrun) and Erpr (through their father Jonakr). At Gudrun's urging, they set off to kill Ermanaric in revenge for his killing of Svanhildr. When Hamdir and Sörli encounter Erpr, they kill him thinking he will not help them, but this means they only maim Ermanaric, who has them killed.	Getica	Ragnarsdrápa, Guðrúnarhvöt, Hamðismál, Völsunga saga	Annals of Quedlinburg
Sóti	Old Norse: Sóti		The name is derived from sót meaning "soot".	Likely Hjálmar's original companion before the Norwegian hero Orvar-Odd was inserted into his legend.		Hervarar saga	
Attack-Soti	Old Norse: Sóknar-Sóti		See Sóti.	A warrior fighting on the side of the Swedish king Sigurd Ring in the massive Battle of Brávellir against the Danish king Harald Wartooth. Sögubrot relates that he fought the shield-maiden Vebjorg, who split his jawbone and cut off his chin, but he kept it in place by biting his own beard. Gesta Danorum tells that she killed him.		Sögubrot, Gesta Danorum (VIII)	
Sporsnjallr	Old Norse: Sporsnjallr	Possibly a historic king of Nerike.	The name is a variant of Fornsnjallr, where Forn- means "old" and -snjallr meaning "excellent". The name possibly originated as an epithet.	As the king of Nerike, he was invited together with a number of other petty kings by the Swedish king Ingjald ill-ruler to a feast at Uppsala, but at night the doors were barred and he hall set on fire, burning everyone inside to death. After this Ingjald expanded his realm to Nerike.		Ynglinga saga	
Starkad	Old Norse: Starkaðr or Stǫrkuðr		The first element is the Germanic starka- which means "strong". The second element may be the theonym Höðr, as both Starkaðr and Höðr slew their unexpecting victims in a mock killing/sacrifice. Alternatively, the second element may be a shortened form of the name *Höðbarðr, referring to the Heaðobards.	One Starkad is a giant that appears to have been killed by Thor, and who is mentioned in a 10th poem by Vetrliði Sumarliðason. He may be the same as the Odinic hero whose life is predermined by having been given gifts by the gods. Odin blesses him with qualities like the gift of poetry, the life span of three men, and being victorious in battle. Thor curses him with three ill deeds, often being wounded and not being able to remember well. These gifts make him victorious but also increasingly drag him down into his fate.	An early version appears unnamed in Beowulf, as the "old Heaðobard", at the wedding of Ingeld and makes him cancel his wedding.	Gautreks saga, Hervarar saga, Skjöldunga saga, Sǫgubrot af fornkonungum, Ásmundar saga kappabana, Ynglinga saga, Gesta Danorum, Norna-Gests þáttr, Helgakviða Hundingsbana II, Skáldskaparmál, and later traditions.	
Starkad Ala-Warrior	Old Norse: Starkaðr Áludrengr		See Starkad for the name. In the cognomen, álu- is presumably from the name of the rapids where he lived, Álu-fossar (possibly Ulefoss in Telemark), while -drengr means "young man" or a "valiant man". Toponymists consider the most likely origin of Ule- to be from vǫlr, a "round staff".	In the U-version of Hervarar saga, Starkad, son of Stórvirkr, is a descendant of giants and he has eight arms. He is betrothed to Ogn álfasprengi. One day when he returned from Élivágar, Hergrímr had abducted his fiancée. Hergrímr has the son Grímr with her before Starkad finds him and challenges him to a holmgang. Starkad fights with four swords at once and kills him, and when Ogn sees Hergrímr die, she kills herself rather than return to Starkad. The latter takes all the riches Hergrímr owned and also his son and raises him as his own. Starkad later kidnaps Alfhild^{3}, the daughter of king Alf of Alfheimr, when she is performing the Disablot to the Disir. King Alf calls on Thor who kills Starkad and liberates Alfhild^{3}, who returns home with Hergrím's son Grímr. During the abduction she bore Starkad a daughter named Bauggerðr who marries Grímr. A related story appears in Gesta Danorum, where Thor tears of four of Starkad's arms to give him a better appearance. In Gautreks saga, Starkad Ala-Warrior kidnaps Alfhild^{3} from her father Alf of Alfheimr, who calls on Thor to help him. Thor kills Starkad and brings Alfhild^{3} home, but she is pregnant with Starkad's son Stórvirkr.		Hervarar saga (U), Gautreks saga, Gesta Danorum	
Starólfr	Old Norse: Starólfr	Fictive.	The name is probably not authentic, but composed of the West Norse names Stórólfr and Stari (the name of one of Hálf's warriors).	One of Hrólfr kraki's champions. He appears in the last battle of the Skjöldungs with Hrólfr the marksman, Hrómundr harði, Svipdag^{2} and Beigaðr and Hvítserkr^{1}, Haklangr, Harðrefill, Haki^{2}, Vǫtt, Hjalti and Bödvar Bjarki.		Hrólfs saga kraka	
Storvirk	Old Norse: Stórvirkr, Stórverkr		Stór- means "big, strong", and virkr means "hard-working, conscientious".	In the U-version of Hervarar saga, Stórvirkr is the father of Starkad Ala-Warrior, who as a descendant of giants has eight arms. In Gautrek's saga he is instead the son of Starkad Ala-Warrior. The latter kidnaps Alfhild^{3} from her father Alf of Alfheimr, who calls on Thor to help him. Thor kills Starkad and brings Alfhild^{3} home, but she is pregnant with Starkad's son Stórvirkr. The boy grows to become big and strong, and handsome with black hair. He enters the service of king Harald of Agder and is responsible for defending his kingdom, and he is given a farm on the island Tromøya. In order to raise a family, he kidnaps a girl named Unnr, the daughter of jarl Freki of Halogaland, and together they have the son Starkad. To avenge the kidnapping of their sister, Unn's brothers Fjori and Fyri arrive one night and block the doors to Storvirk's hall so that he can not get out and kill them. Then they set fire to the hall burning both Storvirk and their sister to death. Their ship founders on the way home and they drown.		Hervarar saga (U), Gautreks saga	
Studas				See Madelger (Studas).			
Stutfuchs	Middle High German: Stûtfuhs, Stûdenfuhs, Stüefinc		The name is of uncertain meaning, but perhaps from LG stût ("thick part of the thigh") and fus ("eager"). The name has been altered via folk etymology (MHG fuhs="fox"). The form Stüefinc replaces the unfamiliar name with one based on MHG stüefe ("brave, strong").	A giant warrior associated with various regions. Usually he is an opponent of Dietrich von Bern, but in Dietrichs Flucht and Rabenschlacht, he is among his supporters.			Dietrichs Flucht, Rabenschlacht, Alpharts Tod, Rosengarten zu Worms, Virginal, Biterolf und Dietleib, Heldenbuch-Prosa
Styrbjörn the Strong	Old Norse: Styrbjǫrn inn sterki, Latin: Sturbiornus	Not historically attested.	The prefix styr- means "a stir, tumult, brawl, disturbance", and -björn means "bear", from PN *bernuz.	Styrbjörn was the son of king Olof Björnsson the brother and co-ruler of Eric the Victorious. He fought with his uncle Eric at the Battle of the Fýrisvellir and fell there, c. 985.		Hervarar saga, Styrbjarnar þáttr Svíakappa, Eyrbyggja saga, Knýtlinga saga, Gesta Danorum (X), Heimskringla, Óláfs saga Tryggvasonar, Háttalykill, contemporary skaldic poetry	
Sváfa^{1}	Old Norse: Sváfa		From PN *swāba- ("Suebian").	Sváfa was a Valkyrie and the daughter of king Eylimi. She found Helgi as she was riding in the company of eight other Valkyries, and as no name had yet attached to him, she named him Helgi ("dedicated to the gods") and as a naming gift she hinted to him that there was a damascened sword hidden in Sigarsholm. She protected him during his battles. Later, they married and she stayed at home, while he was fighting in wars. However, a troll woman had put a curse on Helgi's brother Hethin so when he had drunk the bragarfull at Yule and put his hand on the sacrificial boar, he made the holy toast that he would have Sváfa as wife, which he immediately regretted. When he met his brother, Helgi told him that he might soon die killed in a duel by Hrothmar's son Alf^{7}, who wanted to avenge his father's death at Helgi's hands. As Helgi later lay dying he asked Svafa to marry Hethin, but Hethin told Svafa to kiss him and that she would not see him again until he had avenged his brother. Helgi and Sváfa were reborn as Helgi Hundingsbane and Sigrún.		Helgakviða Hjörvarðssonar	
Sváfa^{2}	Old Norse: Sváfa		See Sváfa^{1}	Bjarmar's daughter who marries the berserker Angantýr^{2} Arngrímsson.		Hervarar saga	
Svafnir	Old Norse: Sváfnir		The name is derived from his kingdom Sváfaland, i.e. "the land of the Suebi".	In Helgakvíða Hjörvarðssonar, Hjörvard^{4} wanted to marry Sigrlinn, the daughter of king Svafnir of Svavaland. He sent Atli^{2}, the son of his jarl Ithmund, to negotiate with Svafnir, but Franmar, the girl's foster-father advised against it. Franmar had previously appeared to Atli in the form of a bird demanding and exorbitant price for her. Hjörvard and Atli ride to Svavaland and find it being invaded and pillaged by Sigrlinn's second suitor Hrothmar who has already killed Svafnir. Hjörvard marries Sigrlinn with whom he has the son Helgi Hjörvardsson, the hero of Helgakvíða Hjörvarðssonar, who later avenges Svafnir, his maternal grandfather, by killing Hrothmar.		Helgakvíða Hjörvarðssonar	
Svafrlami	Old Norse: Svafrlami or Sigrlami		Svafr means "who is bold in turmoil", from PGmc *swebarōn, or "gossip". Sigr- is from *seʒez or *seʒaz ("victory"). The second element lami means "lame" from PGmc *lamaz or *lamōn.	King of Garðriki and owner of the cursed sword Tyrfing. In the H and U versions, and Orvar-Odd's saga, Svafrlami is the son of Sigrlami, who is the son of Odin.		Hervarar saga,Orvar-Odd's saga	
Svafrlod	Old Norse: Svafrlǫð		The element svafr means "gossip" and the element lǫð means "bidding", "invitation".	One of Gudrun's attendants. Gudrun asks why they are depressed and Svafrlod answers that the entire hall is sad. Gudrun asks her to go and make Brynhild come and do weaving and amuse herself, but Svafrlod answers that Brynhild is very angry and has not drunk for days. Brynhild is angry because she has understood that she has been tricked into marrying Gunnar instead of Sigurd.		Völsunga saga (31)	
Svanhildr	Latin: Sonilda (Jordanes), Old Norse: Svanhildr, Foglhildr, Old English: Ealhild		In Old Norse, "Swan-Battle", possibly the first element was originally PGmc *swon- ("atonement, judgment") instead. She also appears with the first element fogl as a variation in Norse poetry, and ealh in Ealhild has been interpreted as the name of a species of bird, maybe a swan.	Wife of Ermanaric; in the Nordic attestations, daughter of Gudrun and Sigurd. Ermanaric kills her on account of the machinations of Sibeche, who has encouraged Ermanaric's son Randver to sleep with her. He has dragged apart by horses. German sources do not mention her, but Ekkehard of Aura records personal names c. 786 that appear to derive from her legend, including Suanailta. Ealhild appears in Widsith as the daughter of an Eadwin and she is escorted by the poet from Angeln to the home of Ermanaric to become his wife (peace-weaver).	Getica, Widsith (5, 97)	Guðrúnarhvöt, Hamðismál, Gesta Danorum, Völsunga saga.	
Sveigðir	Old Norse: Sveigðir, Latin: Swegthir		The name was originally Sveig-þér, from sveigja, PGmc *swaiʒjanan, which means "to bend, to bow" and PGmc *þe(ʒ)waz which means "servant". It was also one of Odin's names.	He was a very early Swedish king who was the son of Fjölnir and the grandson of the Norse god Freyr and the giantess Gerðr. He married a woman named Vana from Vanheimr, the land of the Vanir (a clan of Norse gods), and they had the son Vanlandi. Snorri relates in Ynglinga saga that Sveigðir wanted to meet Odin and ventured out to find the home of the gods (Goðheimr). In the first expedition he came to the land of the Turks (Tyrkland) and to Greater Sweden (Svíþjóð in mikla), i.e. Southern Russia. In the second expedition, he met a dwarf at a big boulder, and the dwarf lured him into the stone promising him that he would meet Odin. The king was drunk and followed the dwarf after which the opening to the stone shut and the king disappeared.		Ynglingatal (II), Historia Norwegiæ, Íslendingabók, Ynglinga saga (12)	
Svip	Old Norse: Svipr		The name means "swoop".	Svip was a wealthy Swedish farmer who used to be a champion, but who lived far away from other men. He was also skilled in magic. He gives wise words of advice to his son Svipdag^{2} when he leaves home to seek service with Aðils (Eadgils), the king of Sweden. When he dreams that his son is in trouble, he sends his two other sons Hvítserkr^{1} and Beigaðr to help him. In Bjarkarímur, the roles between the two sons Hvítserkr^{1} and Svipdagr^{2} are reversed.		Hrólfs saga kraka, Bjarkarímur	
Svipdagr^{1}	Old Norse: Svipdagr, possibly connected to Old English: Swæfdæg.		The name possibly means "sudden day".	In Svipdagsmál, son of the seeress Groa - he awakens her from the dead and receives magical help. He goes to the hall of Menglöð to marry her, but the doorman Fjölsviðr doesn't let him in at once. He then marries Menglöð. He may be connected to OE Swæfdæg, a Suebian and descent of Odin in the genealogies of the Anglo-Saxons.		Svipdagsmál	
Svipdagr^{2}	Old Norse: Svipdagr, Latin: Svebdeg or Svipdagerus	The hero Svipdag shares many traits with Odin, and which connects him to Svipdagr^{4}.	See Svipdagr^{1}.	Svipdag is a champion. He first goes to serve the Swedish king Eadgils (Adils), losing an eye in his service before seeking service with the Danish king Hrolf Kraki instead. He aids Hrolf in reclaiming his inheritance from Eadgils. He serves together with his brothers Hvítserkr^{1} and Beiguðr.		Hrólfs saga kraka, Skáldskaparmál, Hattalykill	
Svipdagr^{3}	Old Norse: Svipdagr, Latin: Suipdagerus		See Svipdagr^{1}	Svipdagr and Geigaðr are two brothers who are outstanding warriors and who appear in two Scandinavian legendary accounts of the death of king Hygelac. It takes six champions to handle each one and in the end of the battle they are taken captive. By the time, Snorri tells of Hygelac's final battle, the Geats appear to have been subsumed by the Swedes, and Hugleikr is described as a Swedish king who was killed by Starkad, but in Gesta Danorum (VI) the same story is told with Huglethus as a king of Ireland. Malone considers Geigaðr to be unhistorical but Svipdagr to be based on a historical Beowulf.		Ynglinga saga (22), Gesta Danorum (VI)	
Svipdagr^{4} the Blind	Old Norse: Svipdagr Blindi	He may be a hypostasis of Odin, and he has similarities to the role of Odin in Gautreks saga.	See Svipdagr^{1}	The Swedish king Anund was often away improving the kingdom's infrastructure, and in his stead Svipdag the Blind ruled over the central district Tiundaland. He was the father of Folkvid, Gautvid and Hulvid. One midwinter sacrifice at Uppsala, Ingjald, the king's son was six years old and cried with frustration over the fact that king Ingvar of Fjädrundaland's son Alf^{5} was stronger than him, although of the same age. His foster-brother Gautvid took him to Svipdag and explained that Ingjald was weak and not very manly. Svipdag was outraged and the next day, he took a pair of tongs and roasted a wolf's heart that he gave Ingjald to eat. From that moment, Ingjald became cruel and ferocious. Together with his sons Gautvid and Hulvid, he fell in battle against Granmar of Södermanland and his ally Hjörvard^{2} Wulfing.		Ynglinga saga	
Swämmel	Middle High German: Swämmel(în)		The name "Swämmel" is probably the diminutive of MHG swam ("sponge").	In the Nibelungenlied, Swämmel is Etzel (Attila)'s minstrel along with Wärbel; both are sent as messengers to invite the Burgundians to Etzel's hall. Swämmel later travels spreading the news of the catastrophe in the Nibelungenklage and his account is dictated to a scribe on the orders of bishop Pilgrim of Passau.			Nibelungenlied, Nibelungenklage
Swerting	Old English: Swerting, Latin: Suertingo		From PN *Swartingaz, from an adjective meaning "black", cf. ON svartr.	Swerting is mentioned in line 1203 in the poem Beowulf, as the uncle, or possibly grandfather, of the Geatish king Hygelac. In the Danish Gesta Danorum (VI), the hero Starkad reproaches king Ingeld for having married the Saxon king Swerting's daughter (or possibly sister), and he divorces her before she bears any child. The source also tells that Swerting and Hanev rebelled against the then Danish king Frodi, which ended in the death of both Swerting and Frodi, after which Ingeld became king. In Skjöldunga saga, Swerting is a Swedish lord under king Jorund and Frodi makes both his subjects, and Frodi's son Ingeld marries Swerting's daughter to achieve peace. However, Swerting and his twelves sons kill Frodi in Denmark and make peace with his son Ingeld (Swerting's son-in-law). Ingeld's brother Halfdan avenges their father by killing Swerting's twelve sons, and upon Starkad's request Ingeld divorces Swerting's daughter.	Beowulf	Skjöldunga saga, Gesta Danorum	

== Sources ==
- Acker, Paul (2007). "Part I. "Fragments of Danish History" (Skjöldunga saga)". ANQ: A Quarterly Journal of Short Articles, Notes and Reviews. 20 (3): 3–9. doi:10.3200/ANQQ.20.3.3-9. S2CID 162198516.
- Anderson, Earl R. (2008). "Beow the Boy-Wonder (Beowulf 12–25)". English Studies. 89 (6): 630–642. doi:10.1080/00138380802396045. S2CID 161149996.
- Heimskringla (PDF). Vol. 1. Translated by Finlay, Alison; Faulkes, Anthony. Viking Society for Northern Research, University College London. 2016. ISBN 978-0-903521-86-4.
- Amodio, Mark C. (2013). The Anglo Saxon Literature Handbook. Vol. 15 (1 ed.). John Wiley & Sons, Incorporated. ISBN 9781118286517.
- Blomkvist, Nils (2005). Crawford, Barbara; Kirby, David; Sigurdsson, Jon-Vidar; Øye, Ingvild; Unger, Richard W.; Urbanczyk, Przemyslaw (eds.). The Discovery of the Baltic, The Reception of a Catholic World-System in the European North (AD 1075-1225). The Northern World, North Europe and the Baltic c. 400-1700 AD, Peoples, Economies and Cultures. Vol. 15. Brill: Leiden, Boston. ISBN 90-04-14122-7.
- Byock, Jesse (1990). The Saga of the Volsungs: The Norse Epic of Sigurd the Dragon Slayer. University of California Press. ISBN 0-520-23285-2.
- Byock, Jesse (1999). The Saga of King Hrolf Kraki. Penguin Classics. ISBN 014043593X.
- Clarke, M. G. (1911). Sidelights on Teutonic History During the Migration Period, being Studies of Beowulf and Other Old English Poems. Cambridge University Press.
- Cleasby, Richard; Vigfússon, Gudbrand (1874). An Icelandic-English dictionary. Oxford Clarendon Press.
- Damico, Helen (1984). Beowulf's Wealhtheow and the Valkyrie Tradition. University of Wisconsin Press. ISBN 0-299-09500-2.
- Dumézil, Georges (1983). Puhvel, Jaan (ed.). The Stakes of the Warrior. Translated by David, Weeks. Berkeley, Los Angeles, London: University of California Press. ISBN 0-520-04834-2.
- Dutton, Douglas Robert (2015). An Encapsulation of Óðinn: Religious belief and ritual practice among the Viking Age elite with particular focus upon the practice of ritual hanging 500 -1050 AD (dissertation) (PDF). Centre for Scandinavian Studies The University of Aberdeen.
- Ellis, Hilda Roderick (1968). "The Road to Hel, a Study of the Conception of the Dead in Old Norse Literature". American Anthropologist. 46 (3). Greenwood Press Publishers, New York: 408–409. doi:10.1525/AA.1944.46.3.02A00210. S2CID 160666598.
- Edda. Translated by Faulkes, Anthony. Everyman. 1995. ISBN 0-460-87616-3.
- The Saga of the Volsungs (PDF). Translated by Finch, R. G. London and Edinburgh: Nelson. 1965.
- Friis-Jensen, Karsten, ed. (2015). Saxo Grammaticus Gesta Danorum, The History of the Danes. Vol. 1. Translated by Fisher, Peter. Oxford University Press. ISBN 978-0-19-82052-34.
- Förstemann, Ernst (1900). Altdeutsches Namenbuch, Band 1: Personennamen (2 ed.). Bonn.
- Francovich Onesti, Nicoletta (2012). "Interaction of Germanic Personal Names with Latin Onomastics in the Late-Roman West. The different Cases of Gothic, Vandalic and Lombard Names". In Borgolte, Michael; Dücker, Julia; Müllerburg, Marcel; Predatsch, Paul; Schneidmüller, Bernd (eds.). Europa im Geflecht der Welt, Mittelarterliche Migrationen in globalen Bezügen. Akademie Verlag. pp. 56–69. ISBN 978-3-05-005983-9.
- Gentry, Francis G.; McConnell, Winder; Müller, Ulrich; Wunderlich, Werner, eds. (2011) [2002]. The Nibelungen Tradition. An Encyclopedia. New York, Abingdon: Routledge. ISBN 978-0-8153-1785-2.
- Gillespie, George T. (1973). Catalogue of Persons Named in German Heroic Literature, 700-1600: Including Named Animals and Objects and Ethnic Names. Oxford: Oxford University. ISBN 978-0-19-815718-2.
- Harrison, Dick (2009). Harrison, Dick (ed.). Sveriges historia. Vol. 2 (1 ed.). Norstedts. ISBN 9789113023779.
- Henrikson, Alf; Törngren, Disa; Hansson, Lars (1998). Stora mytologiska uppslagsboken. Hexikon. ISBN 91-37-11346-1.
- The Poetic Edda. Translated by Hollander, Lee M. Texas University Press. 1928.
- Jiriczek, Otto Luitpold (1898). Deutsche Heldensagen, Band 1. Strasbourg: Karl Trübner. ISBN 9783112176429.
- Snorre Sturluson, Nordiska kungasagor. Vol. 1. Translated by Johansson, Karl G. Fabel bokförlag, Stockholm. 1991. ISBN 91-7842-122-5.
- De Gamle Eddadigte. Translated by Jónsson, Finnur. G. E. C. Gats forlag, København. 1932.
- Kaufmann, Hennig (1968). Ergänzungsband zu Ernst Förstemann: Personennamen. Wilhelm Fink.
- Klaeber, Friedrich (2008). Fulk, R.D.; Bjork, Robert E.; Niles, John D. (eds.). Klaeber's Beowulf and The Fight at Finnsburg. University of Toronto Press. pp. 274–277. ISBN 978-0-8020-9843-6.
- Krause, Arnulf (2010). Reclams Lexikon der germanischen Mythologie und Heldensage. Reclam. ISBN 978-3-15-010778-2.
- Phelpstead, Carl, ed. (2001). A History of Norway and the Passion and Miracles of the Blessed Óláfr (PDF). Translated by Kunin, Devra. Viking Society for Northern Research. ISBN 978-0-903521-48-2.
- Lexer, Matthias (1872–1878). Mittelhochdeutsches Handwörterbuch (3 vols.). Hirzel.
- Lienert, Elisabeth (2015). Mittelhochdeutsche Heldenepik. Berlin: Erich Schmidt. ISBN 978-3-503-15573-6.
- Lincoln, Bruce (2014). Between History and Myth, Stories of Harald Fairhair and the Founding of the State. Chicago and London: The University of Chicago Press. ISBN 978-0-226-14092-6.
- Den Poetiska Eddan. Translated by Lönnroth, Lars. Stockholm: Atlantis. 2016. ISBN 9789173538541.
- Malone, Kemp (1939). "Swerting". Germanic Review (14): 235–257.
- Malone, Kemp (1953). "Royal Names in Old English Poetry". Names. 1 (3): 153–162. doi:10.1179/nam.1953.1.3.153.
- Malone, Kemp (1962). Widsith (Rev. ed.). Copenhagen: Roskilde and Bagger.
- Malone, Kemp (1964) [1923]. The Literary History of Hamlet: The Early Tradition. Vol. 1. New York: Haskell House. ISBN 9780838305935.
- McTurk, Rory (1991). Studies in Ragnars saga Loðbrókar and its Major Scandinavian Analogues. The Society for the Study of Mediæval Languages and Literature, Oxford. ISBN 0-907570-08-9.
- McTurk, Rory W. (2006). "Kings and Kingship in Viking Northumbria" (PDF). In McKinnell, John S.; Ashurst, David; Kick, Donata (eds.). The Fantastic in Old Norse Icelandic Literature, Preprint Papers of the 13th International Saga Conference, Durham and York 6th-12th August 2006. Vol. 2. pp. 681–688.
- Miller, Clarence H. (2007). "Fragments of Danish History". ANQ: A Quarterly Journal of Short Articles, Notes and Reviews. 20 (3): 9–33. doi:10.3200/ANQQ.20.3.9-22. S2CID 161363696.
- Much, Rudolf (1920). "Der germanische Osten in der Heldensage" (PDF). Zeitschrift für deutsches Altertum und deutsche Literatur. 57 (3/4): 145–176. JSTOR 20657072.
- Mueller, Eugen Hartmuth (1939). "Deutung einiger Namen im Nibelungenlied". Monatshefte für Deutschen Unterricht. 31 (6): 274–284. JSTOR 30169580.
- Munch, Victor (1926). Norse Mythology, Legends of Gods and Heroes. New York: The American-Scandinavian Foundation.
- Näsström, Britt-Mari (1996). "Freyja, a Goddess with Many Names". In Billington, Sandra; Green, Miranda (eds.). The Concept of the Goddess. Taylor & Francis Group. pp. 68–77. ISBN 9780203456385.
- Nerman, Birger (1925). Svenska rikets uppkomst. Stockholm: Generalstabens litografiska anstalt.
- Noreen, Adolf (1917). "Sigurd Ring". In Westrin, Th. (ed.). Nordisk Familjebok. Vol. 25 (2 ed.). pp. 460–461.
- Olrik, Axel (1919). The Heroic Legends of Denmark. Translated by Hollander, Lee M. New York: The American-Scandinavian Foundation.
- Orchard, Andy (1997). Dictionary of Norse Myth and Legend. Cassel. ISBN 0-304-34520-2.
- Orel, Vladimir E. (2003). A Handbook of Germanic Etymology. Brill. ISBN 978-90-04-12875-0.
- Osborn, Marijane (2019). "The Alleged Murder of Hrethric in Beowulf". Traditio. 74: 153–177. doi:10.1017/tdo.2019.9. S2CID 210496115.
- Paff, William J. (1959). The Geographical and Ethnic Names in the Þíðriks Saga: A Study in Germanic Heroic Legend. Mouton & co.
- Seven Viking Romances. Translated by Pálsson, Hermann; Edwards, Paul. Penguin Books. 1985. ISBN 0140444742.
- Peterson, Lena (2004). Lexikon över urnordiska personnamn. Uppsala: Institutet för språk och folkminnen.
- Peterson, Lena (2007). Nordiskt runnamnslexikon. Uppsala: Institutet för språk och folkminnen.
- Poole, Russell (2006). "Some Southern Perspectives on Starcatherus". Viking and Medieval Scandinavia. 2: 141–166. doi:10.1484/J.VMS.2.302022. JSTOR 45019110.
- Regebro, Margareta (2009). Ney, Agneta; Williams, Henrik; Charpentier Ljungqvist, Fredrik (eds.). "The women and Óðinn". Á austrvega, Saga and East Scandinavia. 2. Gävle: Gävle University Press: 802–896. ISBN 978-91-978329-0-8.
- Rygh, Oluf (1904). Norske Elvenavne. W.C. Fabritius og sønner A/S.
- Schneider, Hermann (1934). Germanische Heldensage, Bd. 2,2: Englische Heldensage - festländische Heldensage in nordgermanischer und englischer Überlieferung - verlorene Heldensage. de Gruyter.
- Schütte, Gudmund (1912). "The Geats of Beowulf". The Journal of English and Germanic Philology. 11 (4): 574–602. JSTOR 27700194.
- Schütte, Gudmund (1926). "Dansk kongetals tusendaarige traad". Dansk Historisk Tidskrift. 9 (5).
- Simek, Rudolf (1993). Dictionary of Northern Mythology. Translated by Hall; Angela. D. S. Brewer. ISBN 0-85991-369-4.
- Storm, Gustav (1915). "Ragnar Lodbrok". In Westrin, Th. (ed.). Nordisk Familjebok. Vol. 22 (2 ed.). pp. 910–912.
- The Saga of King Heidrek the Wise (PDF). Translated by Tolkien, Christopher. 1960.
- Uecker, Heiko (1972). Germanische Heldensage. Stuttgart: Metzler. ISBN 3476101061.
- de Vries, Jan (1970). Altgermanische Religionsgeschichte, Bd.2, Die Götter, Vorstellungen über den Kosmos, Der Untergang des Heidentums. de Gruyter, Berlin. ISBN 978-3110028072.
- de Vries, Jan (1962). Altnordisches Etymologisches Worterbuch (2000 ed.). Brill. ISBN 90-04-05436-7.
- The Sagas of Ragnar Lodbrok. Translated by Waggoner, Ben. New Haven: Troth Publications. 2009.
- Wessén, Elias (1952). Wessén, Elias; Helgason, Jón; Knudsen, Trygve; Skautrup, Peter (eds.). Ynglingsaga. Svenska bokförlaget Norstedts, Stockholm; Ejnar Munksgaard, København; Dreyers forlag, Oslo.
- Westrin, Th. (1908). "Gautvidr". In Westrin, Th. (ed.). Nordisk Familjebok. Vol. 9 (2 ed.). p. 820.
