= Sea-King =

Powerful Viking pirate chieftain

A sea-king (sækonungr) in the Norse sagas is generally a title given to a powerful Viking chieftain, even though the term sea-king may sometimes predate the Viking age.

The Orkneyinga saga contains the earliest reference to sea-kings. There the original line of 'kings' of Kvenland (present-day Finland) ends with the father of Gor Thorrasson 'Sea King'.

Sea-kings could also be independent or noble Norwegian and Danish chieftains, and also kings of Sweden (such as Yngvi and Jorund), or sons of kings, such as Refil. However, they could also be men "without roof" like Hjörvard the Ylfing; such men without roof could be so powerful that they could subdue a country and make themselves kings. Two examples are Sölve who killed the Swedish king Östen, and Haki who killed the Swedish king Hugleik. However, in both cases they ultimately lost due to lack of popular support.

== List of sea-kings as given in the Nafnaþulur 1-5 ==
- Ale the Strong
- Asmund
- Atal
- Ati
- Atli
- Audmund
- Beimi
- Beimuni
- Beiti
- Budli
- Byrvil
- Ekkil
- Endill
- Frodi
- Eynef
- Gaupi
- Gæir
- Gauti|Geat
- Gautrek
- Geitir
- Gestil
- Gjuki
- Glammi
- Gor
- Gudmund
- Gylfi
- Hagbard
- Haki
- Half
- Harek
- Heiti
- Hemlir
- Hiorolf
- Hjalmar
- Hnefi
- Hogni
- Homar
- Horvi
- Hraudnir
- Hraudung
- Hun
- Hunding
- Hviting
- Hæmir
- Iorek
- Kilmund
- Leifi
- Longhorn
- Lyngvi
- Mævi
- Mævil
- Meiti
- Moir
- Mysing
- Nori
- Næfil
- Ræfil
- Randver
- Rakni
- Reifnir
- Rer
- Rodi
- Rokkvi
- Skefil
- Skekkil
- Solsi
- Solvi
- Sorvi
- Sveidi
- Teiti
- Thvinnil
- Vandil
- Vinnil
- Virfil
- Yngvi
