= Adolph of Sweden =

Adolph of Sweden - Swedish: Adolf and Alf - may refer to:

- Adolph, legendary Swea king better known as Alf
- Adolph Frederick (1710–1771), King of Sweden 1751–1771
- Alf Johansson, Swedish prince 12th century, buried at Vreta Abbey
- Adolph John I, Count Palatine of Kleeburg (1629–1689), Prince of Sweden from 1654
- A number of Swedish kings and Swedish princes who had Adolph as a secondary name
