= Solvi =

Solvi, Sölvi, or Sølvi is both a given name and a surname. Notable people with the name include:

== Solvi ==
- Solvi Stubing (1941–2017), German actress
- Mickaël Solvi (fl. 2014), French Guianan footballer

== Sölvi ==
- Sölvi Fannar (born 1971), Icelandic actor
- Sölvi Helgason (1820–1895), Icelandic artist
- Sölvi Ottesen (born 1984), Icelandic footballer
- Stefán Sölvi Pétursson (born 1986), Icelandic strongman
- Snævar Sölvi Sölvason (born 1985), Icelandic film director

== Sølvi ==
- Sølvi Olsen Meinseth (born 1967), Norwegian athlete
- Sølvi Sogner (1932–2017), Norwegian historian
- Sølvi Vatnhamar (born 1986), Faroese footballer
- Sølvi Wang (1929–2011), Norwegian singer

== See also ==
- Sǫlvi, semi-legendary kings of Sweden
