= Eysteinn of Sweden =

Semi-legendary Swedish king

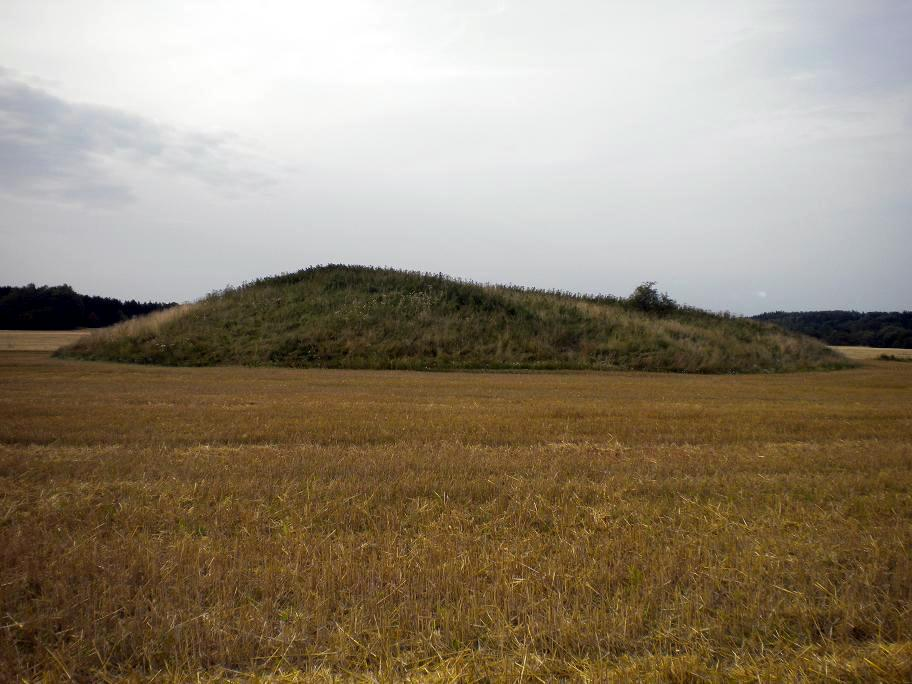
Östens hög at Östanbro, in Västerås kommun

Eysteinn (Swedish: Östen, died c. 600) was a semi-legendary king of Sweden, the son of Eadgils. He was the father of Ingvar. Östens hög ('Östen’s tumulus') in Västerås near Östanbro has been linked to King Eysteinn by some popular historians.

== Sources ==
=== Ynglingatal ===
The oldest source for king Eysteinn is Þjóðólfr of Hvinir's 9th century genealogical poem Ynglingatal. This poem is preserved in direct citation in Snorri Sturluson’s 13th century Ynglinga saga and in Latin paraphrase in the anonymous 12th century Historia Norwegiæ. It provides a source for Snorri's statement that the killers of Eysteinn were Jutes:

Veitk Eysteins
enda folginn
lokins lífs
á Lófundi.
Ok sikling
með Svíum kvôðu
józka menn
inni brenna.
Ok bitsótt
í brandnói
hlíðar þangs
á hilmi rann,
þás timbrfastr
toptar nǫkkvi
flotna fullr
of fylki brann.

‘I know the end of the concluded life of Eysteinn to be hidden in Lófund. And among the Swedes [people] said that men from Jutland burned the ruler inside [a house]. And the biting sickness of the sea-weed of the hill-slope [FOREST > FIRE] attacked the ruler in the fire-ship [HOUSE] when the timber-fast boat of the building plot [HOUSE], full of seafarers, burned over the ruler.’

=== Historia Norwegiæ ===
The 12th century Historia Norwegiæ presents a Latin summary of Ynglingatal, older than Snorri's quotation (continuing after Eadgils, called Adils or Athisl):

Hic [Adils vel Athisl] genuit Eustein, quem Gautones in domo quadam obtrusum cum suis vivum incenderunt. Hujus filius Ynguar [...].

He [Adils] became sire to Øystein, whom the Götar thrust into a house and incinerated alive there with his men. His son Yngvar, [...]

=== Ynglinga saga ===
According to the most elaborate but also youngest source, the 13th century Ynglinga saga, Eysteinn ruled Sweden at the time when Hrólf Kraki died in Lejre. It was a troubled time when many piratical sea kings ravaged Swedish shores. One of those kings was named Sölve and he was from Jutland (though according to Historia Norwegiae he was Geatish, see below). At this time Sölve was pillaging in the Baltic Sea. He arrived in Lofond (probably the island of Lovön or the Lagunda Hundred), where Eysteinn was at a feast. Sölve and his men surrounded the house and set it on fire, burning everyone inside to death. Then Sölve arrived at Sigtuna (Old Sigtuna) and ordered the Swedes to accept him as king. The Swedes refused and gathered an army that fought against Sölve and his men, but they lost after eleven days. The Swedes had to accept him as king until they rebelled and killed him.

=== Later sources ===
Thorsteins saga Víkingssonar makes Eysteinn the father of Anund and grandfather of Ingjald and consequently skips Ingvar's generation. It adds a second son to Eysteinn named Olaf, who was the king of Fjordane in Norway.

== Sources ==
- Nerman, B. (1925). Det Svenska Rikets Uppkomst. Generalstab.

Eysteinn of Sweden House of Yngling
Preceded by Adils	Legendary king of Sweden	Succeeded by Sölve
