= Sikling =

The Siklings were a villainous clan in Norse mythology. In Skáldskaparmál, Snorri reports that they are descended from a Sigar who was the son of Halfdan the Old.

[...] the ninth, Sigarr, whence come the Siklings: that is the house of Siggeirr, who was son-in-law of Völsungr,—and the house of Sigarr, who hanged Hagbardr.

Hversu Noregr byggðist gives more detail to the Sikling clan informing that Sigar had the two sons Siggeir and Sigmund, who had the son Sigar (the one who hanged Hagbard).

Siggeir is the Geatish king who murdered Völsung and most of his family. The younger Sigar is the one who kidnapped one of Haki's daughters and murdered a second one according to the Völsunga saga and hanged Hagbard according to Skáldskaparmál and Gesta Danorum (book 7). The last murder is also referred to in Háleygjatal and in Ynglingatal.
