= Endill =

Character in Norse Mythology

In Norse mythology, Endill is a jötunn, god or sea-king. He is attested in the Prose Edda list Nafnaþulur, and in various kennings.

In Nafnaþulur, he is mentioned as only a name in a list of 75 sea kings. In Þórsdrápa his name appears in the kenning á Endils mó which means "onto Endil's moor" and refers to the sea. Likewise, on the Karlevi Runestone his name appears in [Æ]ndils iarmungrundaʀ ("Endill's vast ground") which is a kenning for the sea. The Scandinavian Rundata project translates it as "Endill's expanses" or "Endill's mighty dominion", and suggests that Endill may have been a god of the vessels of the sea. Other kennings where he appears are Endils öndur meaning "Endil's ski" and Endils eykur meaning "Endil's horse" both referring to ships. Another kenning Endils fold which means "Endil's earth" is a kenning for the sea.
