= Anund =

Semi-legendary Swedish king

Legendary King of Sweden
- Predecessor: Ingvar Harra
- Successor: Ingjald
- Died: Himinheiðr
- Burial: unknown; speculated to have been Anundshög, Västmanland, modern-day Sweden
- Issue: Ingjald
- Father: Ingvar Harra

Anund (Swedish: Bröt-Anund, meaning trail-blazer Anund or Anund the Land Clearer), also called Brøt-Anundr (Old East Norse) or Braut-Önundr (Old West Norse) was a semi-legendary Swedish king of the House of Yngling who reigned in the mid-seventh century. The form of the name used during his lifetime would have been Proto-Norse *Anuwinduz, meaning "winning ancestor".

== Life ==
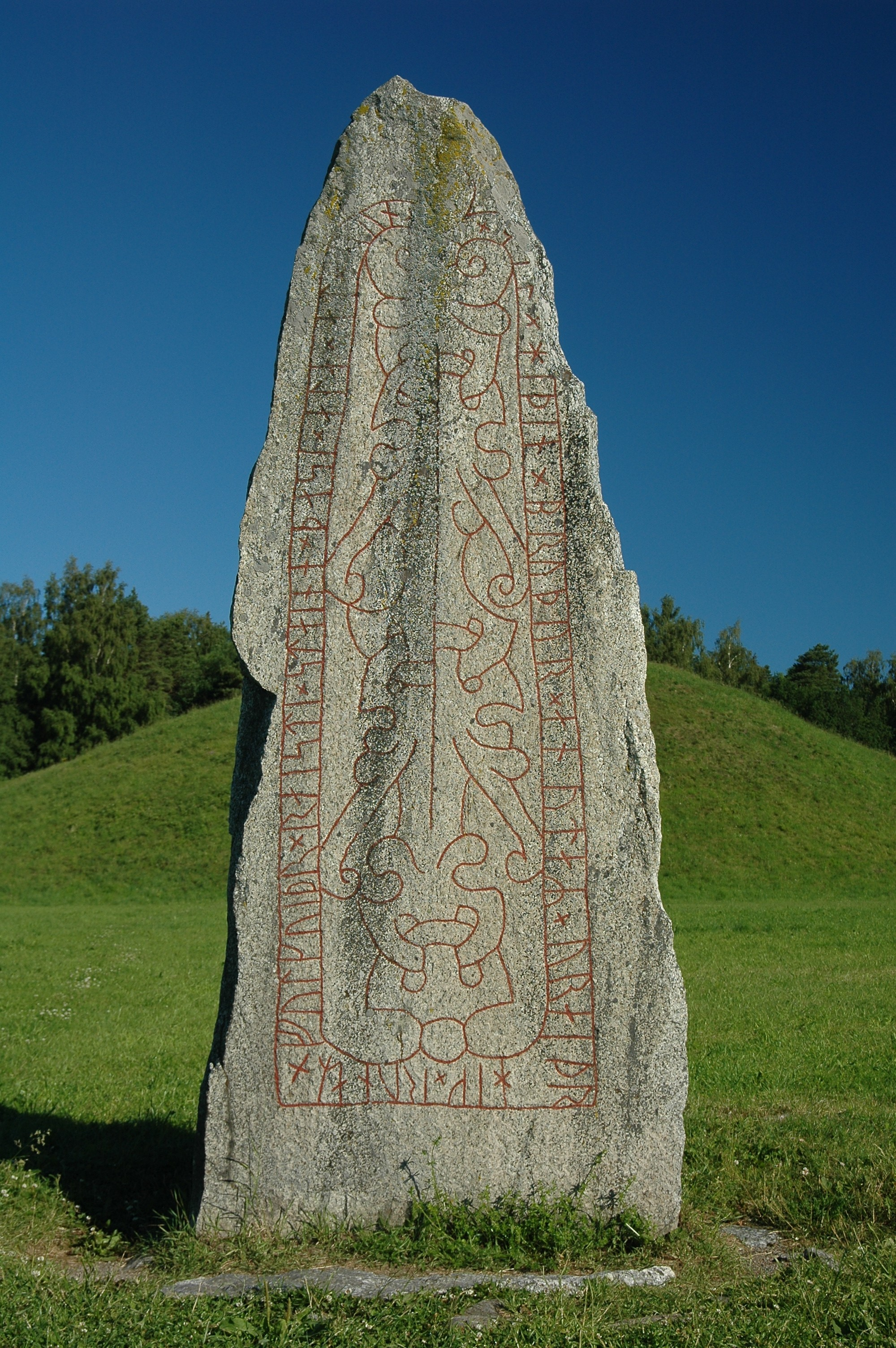
Anundshög runestone, Vs at a grave associated with Anund.

In his Ynglinga saga, Snorri Sturluson relates that Anund succeeded his father, king Yngvar, who fell in battle with the ″Estonian vikings″. After his father's wars against Danish and Estonian Vikings, peace reigned over Sweden and there were good harvests. Anund was a popular king who became very rich, not only because of the peace and the good harvests but also because he avenged his father in Estonia. That country was ravaged far and wide and in the autumn Anund returned with great riches.

In those days Sweden was dominated by vast and uninhabited forests, so Anund started making roads and clearing land, and vast districts were settled by Swedes. Consequently, he was named Bröt-Anund. He made a farm for himself in every district and used to stay as a guest in many homes.

One autumn, King Anund was travelling between his halls (see Husbys) and came to a place called Himinheiðr (sky heath) between two mountains. He was surprised by a landslide which killed him.

After presenting this story of Anund, Snorri Sturluson quotes Þjóðólfr of Hvinir's Ynglingatal:

Varð Ǫnundr Jónakrs bura harmi heptr und Himinfjǫllum. Ok ofvæg Eistra dolgi heipt hrísungs at hendi kom. Ok sá frǫmuðr foldar beinum Hǫgna *reyrs of horfinn vas.	Ǫnundr was killed by the pain of the sons of Jónakr [STONES] beneath Himinfjǫll. And the crushing hatred of the bastard [STONES] came upon the enemy of the Estonians [= Ǫnundr]. And that wielder of the reed of Hǫgni <legendary hero> [SWORD > WARRIOR] was surrounded by the bones of the earth [STONES].

The Historia Norwegiæ presents a Latin summary of Ynglingatal, older than Snorri's quotation (continuing after Ingvar Harra):

Iste ergo genuit Broutonund, quem Sigwardus frater suus occidit in Himinheithi, quod loci vocabulum interpretatur coeli campus. Post istum filius suus Ingialdr [...].

Yngvar bred Braut-Ånund, whose brother, Sigurd, laid him low in Himinheid, a place-name which means 'field of heaven'. After him his son Ingjald [...]

The original text of Ynglingatal is hard to interpret, and it only says that Anund died und Himinfjöllum (under the sky mountains) and that stones were involved. According to Historia Norwegiæ, he was murdered by his brother Sigvard in Himinherthy (which the source says means "the fields of the sky", cœli campus). A place with this name is not known, and Swedish archaeologist Birger Nerman (1888–1971) suggests that the original place of death was under the sky mountains, i.e. under the clouds (cf. the etymology of cloud). Consequently, he may have been killed outdoors, by his brother and with a stone.

Thorsteins saga Víkingssonar says that Anund was not the son of Ingvar Harra, but Östen. It also relates that he had a brother named Olaf who was the king of Fjordane.

All sources say that Anund was the father of Ingjald (Ingjald Illråde).

== See also ==
- Anundshög

== Primary sources ==
- Historia Norwegiæ
- Thorsteins saga Víkingssonar
- Ynglingatal
- Ynglinga saga (part of the Heimskringla)

== Secondary sources ==
- Birger Nerman (1925) Det svenska rikets uppkomst (Stockholm: Föreningen för svensk kulturhistoria)

Anund House of Yngling
Preceded by Ingvar Harra	Legendary king of Sweden	Succeeded by Ingjald
