= Sölve =

Viking pirate chieftain, re del mare

Sölve (Old Norse: Sǫlvi) was a sea-king who conquered Vendel-period Sweden by burning the Swedish king Eysteinn to death inside his hall.

The Heimskringla states that Sölve was the son of Högne of Njardö, and that his home was located in Jutland. However, in the Historia Norwegiæ, an older source, he was instead described as a Geat.

== Early life ==
Sölve appears in Hálfs saga ok Hálfsrekka, in a version from 1300. This saga relates that Sölve was the son of Högne, the Rich of Nærøya fyrir Naumundalsminni in Norway, and the brother of Hild the Slender. Sölve's brother-in-law, Hjorleiv, was the king of Hordaland and Rogaland.

== Ruler ==
Sölve pillaged in the Baltic Sea. One night, Sölve and his men landed in the hundred of Lofond/Lovund (perhaps Lovön or the Lagunda Hundred), where they surrounded a house and set it on fire, killing everybody inside. Swedish king Eysteinn was attending a feast there. After this, Sölve and his men arrived in Sigtuna (now Signhildsberg) and declared that the Swedes had to accept him as king. The Swedes refused and fought Sölve for eleven days, but were defeated. Sölve then ruled Sweden until the Swedes eventually rebelled and killed him.

Historia Norwegiae only relates that the Geats burnt Östen and his people to death inside his house.

Hjorleiv killed Hreidar, the king of Zealand. Then Hjorleiv put Sölve as the jarl of Zealand. Later in the saga, Sölve was no longer the jarl of Zealand, but the king of Sweden. Hjorleiv had a son named Half (after whom the saga is named), and after the Norwegian king Asmund had killed Half, a couple of his champions go to Sweden and king Sölve (til svíþjóðar; fóru þeir ... á fund Sölva konungs) (see also Gard Agdi).

Sölve is mentioned in a few other sources, but none of them describe his Danish and Swedish dominions.

He was succeeded by Ingvar Harra, son of Eysteinn of the Yngling (the Swedish royal dynasty).

Preceded by Eysteinn	Legendary king of Sweden	Succeeded by Ingvar Harra
