= Hugleik =

Legendary Swedish king

According to the Ynglinga saga, Hugleik or Ochilaik was a Swedish king of the House of Yngling. He was the son of Alf and Bera.

Some commentators have identified Hugleik with the Geatish king Hygelac. However, although both kings were killed in battle, Chlochilaicus/Hygelac was reportedly killed near the coast of France/Frisia, while Hugleik was allegedly killed at Fyrisvellir in Sweden.

When Hugleik's father and uncle had killed each other, Hugleik inherited the Swedish throne. Like his father, he was not a warrior, but preferred to stay at home. He was reputed to be as greedy as he was rich and, he preferred to be in the company of jesters, seidmen and völvas who entertained him.

Haki and Hagbard (the hero of the legend of Hagbard and Signy) were two famous sea-kings who had amassed a great force of warriors, and they occasionally plundered together. Haki arrived in Sweden with his troops to assault Uppsala. Haki was a murderous fighter and around himself he had his twelve hirdmen of whom one was the legendary old warrior Starkad (who had been in the service of Hugleik's grandfather Erik and great-uncle Alrik).

Hugleik had also mustered a large army and he was aided by two famous warriors named Svipdag and Geigad.

The two armies met on the Fyrisvellir (Fyris Wolds) and a great battle ensued. The Swedish army was defeated, but the two champions Svipdag and Geigad pushed onwards even though Haki's champions were six times as many. They were both captured by Haki, and then Haki attacked the shield-circle around Hugleik and killed him together with both his sons.

Saxo Grammaticus knows of this story but he renders Huglet(h)us as an Irish king who was killed by the Dane Haco (given as Hakon in the following translation ). The motivation behind describing Hugleik as an Irish king was probably identical to what Saxo described as the motivation behind the attack: even the farthest kingdoms of the world might not be untouched by the Danish arms.

Saxo writes that Starkad and Haki brought their fleet to Ireland where lived the rich and greedy king Hugleik. Hugleik was never generous to an honourable man, but spent all his riches on mimes and jugglers. In spite of his avarice, Hugleik had the great champions Geigad and Svipdag.

When the battle began, the jugglers and mimes panicked and fled, and only Geigad and Svipdag remained to defend Hugleik, but they fought like an entire army. Geigad dealt Starkad a wound on the head, which was so severe that Starkad would later sing songs about it.

Starkad killed Hugleik and made the Irish flee. He then had the jugglers and mimes whipped and beaten, in order to humiliate them. Then the Danes brought Hugleik's riches out to Dublin to be publicly looted, and there was so much of it that none cared for its strict division.

== Secondary sources ==
- Nerman, B. Det svenska rikets uppkomst. Stockholm, 1925.

Hugleik House of Yngling
| Preceded by Yngvi and Alf | Mythological king of Sweden | Succeeded by Haki |
