= Siggeir =

King of Gautland

Siggeir is the king of Gautland (i.e. Götaland/Geatland, but in some translations also rendered as Gothland), in the Völsunga saga. In Skáldskaparmál he is given as a Sikling and a relative of Sigar who killed the hero Hagbard. Hversu Noregr byggðist specifies that the last Sigar was Siggeir's nephew.

According to the Völsunga saga, Siggeir married Signy, the sister of Sigmund and the daughter of King Völsung. Although Völsung agreed to the marriage, Signy herself was unwilling. At the banquet Odin appears in disguise wearing a cape and a hood and sticks a sword in the tree Branstock. Then he said that whoever managed to pull the sword out could keep it. Siggeir and everyone else tried but only Sigmund succeeded. Siggeir generously offered three times the sword's value, but Sigmund mockingly refused. Siggeir was offended and went home the next day thinking of revenge.

Siggeir invites Sigmund, his father Völsung and Sigmund's nine brothers to a visit in Gautland to see the newlyweds three months later. When the Völsung clan had arrived they were attacked by the Gauts (Geats) and king Völsung was killed and his sons captured.

Signy beseeched her husband to spare her brothers and to put them in stocks instead of killing them. As Siggeir thought that the brothers deserved to be tortured before they were killed, he agreed.

Each night a wolf, who may have been Siggeir's mother, devoured one of the brothers, until only Sigmund remained. Signy had a servant smear honey on the face of Sigmund and when the she-wolf arrived she started licking the honey off Sigmund's face. As she licked, she stuck her tongue into Sigmund's mouth, whereupon Sigmund bit her tongue off, killing her. Sigmund then hid in the forests of Gautland and Signy brought him everything he needed.

Signy gave Siggeir two sons and when the oldest one was ten years old, she sent him to Sigmund to train him to avenge the Völsungs. The boy did not stand a test of courage so Signy asked Sigmund to kill her worthless son. The same thing happened to Siggeir's second son.

Signy came to Sigmund in the guise of a witch and she and her brother committed incest and had the son Sinfjotli. After some adventures Sigmund and Sinfjotli killed Siggeir.

== See also ==
- King of the Geats
