= Ingvar =

Semi-legendary Swedish king

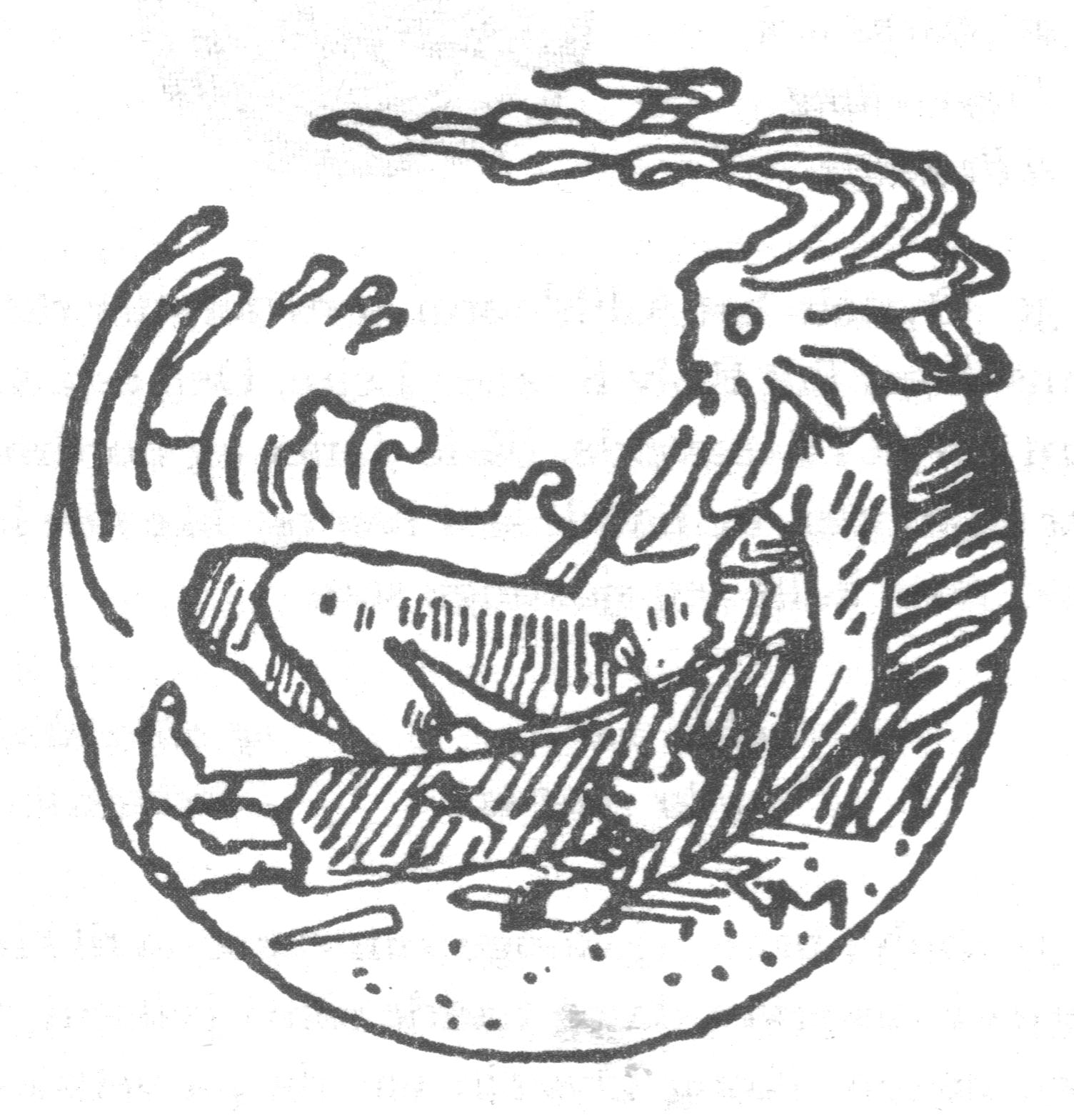

Legendary King of Sweden
- Predecessor: Sölve
- Successor: Anund
- Died: early 7th century
Names
- Yngvar Harra (translate: "the tall")
- Dynasty: House of Yngling
- Father: Eysteinn

Ingvar or Yngvar (Old Norse: Yngvarr [ˈyŋɡwɑrː], d. early 7th century) was the son of Östen and reclaimed the Swedish throne for the House of Yngling after the Swedes had rebelled against Sölve. He is reported to have fallen in battle in Estonia and been buried there. Although the account of Ingvar is semi-legendary, the discovery of two boat grave sites in Salme, modern Estonia has confirmed that a similar historic event took place in the 8th century.

== Ynglinga saga ==
Snorri Sturluson relates in his Ynglinga saga that King Ingvar, Östen's son, was a great warrior who often spent time patrolling the shores of his kingdom fighting Danes and Estonian vikings (Víkingr frá Esthland). King Ingvar finally came to a peace agreement with the Danes and could take care of the Estonian vikings.

He consequently started pillaging in Estonia in retribution, and one summer he arrived at a place called Stein (see also Sveigder). The Estonians (sýslu kind) assembled a great army in the interior and attacked King Ingvar in a great battle. The Estonian forces were too powerful and Ingvar fell and the Swedish forces retreated. Ingvar was buried in a mound at a place called Stone or Hill fort (at Steini) on the shores of Saaremaa (Aðalsýsla).

== Ynglingatal ==
Snorri then quotes a stanza from Þjóðólfr of Hvinir's Ynglingatal:

Þat stǫkk upp,
at Yngvari
Sýslu kind
of sóit hafði.
Ok Ljósham
við lagar hjarta
herr eistneskr
at hilmi vá.
Ok austmarr
jǫfri sœnskum
Gymis ljóð
at gamni kveðr.

Translation: 'Word spread quickly, that the people of Sýsla had slain Yngvarr. And an Estonian force attacked the ruler, Ljóshamr ('the Light-skinned'), at the heart of the water [ISLAND]. And the Baltic sea sings the songs of Gymir <sea-giant> to the delight of the Swedish ruler.'

== Other sources ==
The Historia Norwegiæ presents a Latin summary of Ynglingatal, older than Snorri's quotation (continuing after Eysteinn):

Hujus filius Ynguar, qui cognominatus est canutus, in expeditione occisus est in quadam insula Baltici maris, quæ ab indigenis Eysysla vocatur. Iste ergo genuit Broutonund, quem Sigwardus frater suus [...].

His son Yngvar, nicknamed the Hoary, was killed by the inhabitants while campaigning on an island in the Baltic called Ösel. Yngvar bred Braut-Ånund, whose brother, Sigurd, [...]

Ynglingatal only mentions the location Sysla (area paying tribute), Historia Norwegiae only mentions that he died during a campaign on the island Eycilla, i.e. Eysysla (Ösel). In addition to his son Anund (Broutonund), it also adds second son named Sigvard.

Thorsteins saga Víkingssonar skips Ingvar's generation and makes his father Östen the father of Anund and grandfather of Ingjald. It adds a second son to Östen named Olaf, who was the king of Fjordane in Norway.

== Archaeology ==
In 2008–2010, the ship burial of two ships were discovered in Salme, Estonia, the Salme ships. Remains from at least 42 individuals were discovered in the two ships. Most of them belonged to 30–40 years old males who had been killed in battle. Isotope analysis of some of the teeth, combined with the design of the buried artifacts, suggest that the men came from central Sweden. The smaller ship contained the skeletal remains of 7 individuals. There were at least 36 individuals buried in four layers in the large ship. In samples from the 7th century Salme defined Y-chromosome haplogroup R1a1a1b, N1a1a1a1a1a1a, I1-M253 and mtDNA haplogroup T2b5a, V, J2a1a1a2, H10e, K1c1h, W6a, U3b1b. The DNA analysis showed that four of the men were brothers and they were related to a fifth man, perhaps an uncle.

The ships were clinker-built and archaeologists have estimated their time of construction to be AD 650–700 in Scandinavia. There are signs indicating they had been repaired and patched for decades before making their final voyage. One of the ships is 11.5 metres (38 ft) long and 2 metres (7 ft) wide. It did not have mast or sails, and they would have been rowed for short distances along the Baltic coast, or between islands, or straight across the Baltic, as rowing longer distances has proved perfectly feasible time and again in modern times. This is also indicated by the Old Norse word for distance across water "vikusjö, vikja" the distance to row before changing rowers, a distance of about 4.2 nautical miles (7.8 km; 4.8 mi).

The second ship was 17–17.5 metres (56–57 ft) long and 3 metres (10 ft) wide. This larger ship had a keel for sailing which would arguable make it the oldest viking sailing ship found so far, possibly redefining the beginning of the viking age (for comparison see Oseberg Ship, Gokstad ship and Gjellestad ship burial).

According to a confirmed interpretation offered by Jüri Peets, the lead archaeologist at the site, the ships and the dead are of Scandinavian origin, from Mälar region in Sweden, where similarly decorated sword hilts have been found; osteological analysis also indicates Mälar region and several men have been found to relatives.

According to one scenario, a war party of Scandinavians attempted to carry out a raid against the Oeselians (Estonian inhabitants of the island of Saaremaa), but were attacked by Oeselian ships. The sides of the two ships contain numerous embedded arrowheads, some of which are of the three-pointed type used to carry burning materials to set enemy ships aflame. After losing too many oarsmen to the Estonian archers, the raiders pulled their ships aground and tried to defend themselves behind them. It appears that after the battle, the Oeselians allowed either the survivors or some other group of Scandinavians to ritually bury their dead. The burial is unusual because the ships were not covered with earth mounds. The site was eventually forgotten by the local inhabitants after it had become overblown by sand and covered with vegetation. The raid-hypothesis has led to a questioning of when the Viking Age began exactly. The Salme event took place 50–100 years earlier than the infamous Lindisfarne Viking raid in England in the summer of AD 793.

The original interpretation was called into question after the second, larger, ship was uncovered in 2010. It is likely that the human remains in it belonged to individuals of noble birth, as evidenced by the large number of expensive bronze sword-hilts and the complete lack of weaponry associated with commoners. The presence of dogs and hawks used for falconry indicates that the original purpose of the trip to Estonia may have been leisure or diplomacy. Peets suggests that the men may have come on a voyage from Sweden to forge an alliance or establish kinship ties when unknown parties set upon them.

== Primary sources ==
- Ynglingatal
- Ynglinga saga (part of the Heimskringla)
- Historia Norwegiae
- Thorsteins saga Víkingssonar

== Secondary sources ==
Nerman, B. Det svenska rikets uppkomst. Stockholm, 1925.

Ingvar House of Yngling
| Preceded by Sölve | Legendary king of Sweden | Succeeded by Anund |
