= Yngvi and Alf =

Mythological Swedish kings

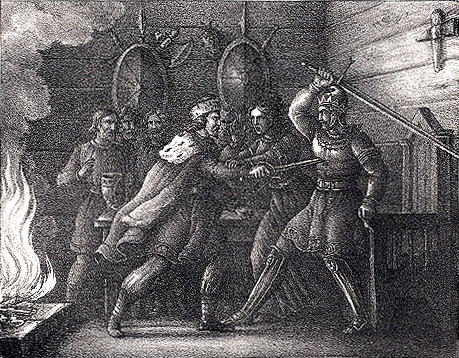
Alf and Yngvi slaying each other

Yngvi and Alf, according to legend, were two Swedish kings of the House of Yngling. Some versions indicate they were brothers or other close relations. They killed each other.

== History ==
According to Ynglingatal, Historia Norwegiae and Ynglinga saga, Yngvi and Alf were the sons of Alrik.

Snorri Sturluson relates that Yngvi was an accomplished king: a great warrior who always won his battles, the master of all exercises, generous, happy and sociable. He was both loved and famous.

Alf was unsociable and harsh and stayed at home instead of pillaging in other countries. His mother was Dageid, the daughter of king Dag the Great from whom is descended the Dagling family. Alf was married to Bera who was happy and alert and a very lovable woman.

One day in the autumn, Yngvi returned to Uppsala from a very successful Viking expedition which had rendered him famous. He used to spend time at the drinking table until late in the night, like Bera, and they found it pleasant to talk to each other. Alf, however, preferred to go to bed early and he started to tell her to go to bed early as well so that she did not wake him. Then Bera used to answer that Yngvi was much better for a woman than Alf, an answer that was getting on Alf's nerves.

One evening, the jealous Alf entered the hall and saw Yngvi and Bera converse on the high seat. Yngvi had a short sword in his lap and the other guests were too drunk to see that Alf had arrived. From under his cloak Alf drew a sword and pierced Yngvi. Yngvi, mortally wounded, got up, drew his own short sword and slew Alf. They were buried in two mounds on the Fyrisvellir (Fyris Wolds).

Alf was succeeded by his son Hugleik.

The poem in Ynglingatal:

Ok varð hinn, er Alfr of vá vörðr véstalls, of veginn liggja, er dölingr dreyrgan mæki öfundgjarn á Yngva rauð. Var-a þat bært at Bera skyldi valsœfendr vígs of hvetja, þá er brœðr tveir at bönum urðusk, óþurfendr, of afbrýði.	I tell you of a horrid thing, A deed of dreadful note I sing -- How by false Bera, wicked queen, The murderous brother-hands were seen Each raised against a brother's life; How wretched Alf with bloody knife Gored Yngve's heart, and Yngve's blade Alf on the bloody threshold laid. Can men resist Fate's iron laws? They slew each other without cause.

The Historia Norwegiæ presents a Latin summary of Ynglingatal, older than Snorri's quotation:

Cujus [Hogne, i.e. Agne ] filius Ingialdr in Swethia a fratre suo ob infamiam uxoris ejus occisus est, quæ Bera dicta est (hoc nomen latine sonat ursa). Post hunc filius ejus Jorundr [...]

His [Agne's] son, Ingjald, was murdered in Sweden by his own brother because he had brought discredit on the latter's wife, whose name was Bera (Ursa in Latin). After him his son Jorund ruled, [...]

Ingjaldr is held to be an error for Yngvi. Unlike Ynglingatal, Historia Norwegiæ gives Agne as Yngvi's predecessor. Instead Alrekr precedes Agne and Agne is succeeded by Yngvi. The even earlier source Íslendingabók cites the line of descent in Ynglingatal and it gives the same line of succession as Historia Norwegiæ: xi Dagr. xii Alrekr. xiii Agni. xiiii Yngvi. xv Jörundr.

== Ari Frodi's Younger Íslendingabók ==
According to Ari Frodi's line of Swedish kings Yngvi was the son of Agne, and not of Agne's son Alrik.

== Gesta Danorum ==
In Gesta Danorum, Alf (Alverus) was the father of Yngve (Ing) and Ingjald (Ingild). Ingjald, in his turn was the father of Sigurd Hring and the grandfather of Ragnar Lodbrok.

== See also ==
- Ynglingatal
- Ynglinga saga (part of the Heimskringla)
- Historia Norwegiae
- Hervarar saga
- Orvar-Odd's saga
- Íslendingabók

== Notes ==
Yngvi and Alf House of Yngling
Preceded by Erik and Alrik	Mythological king of Sweden	Succeeded by Hugleik
