= Lovön =

Island in Ekerö

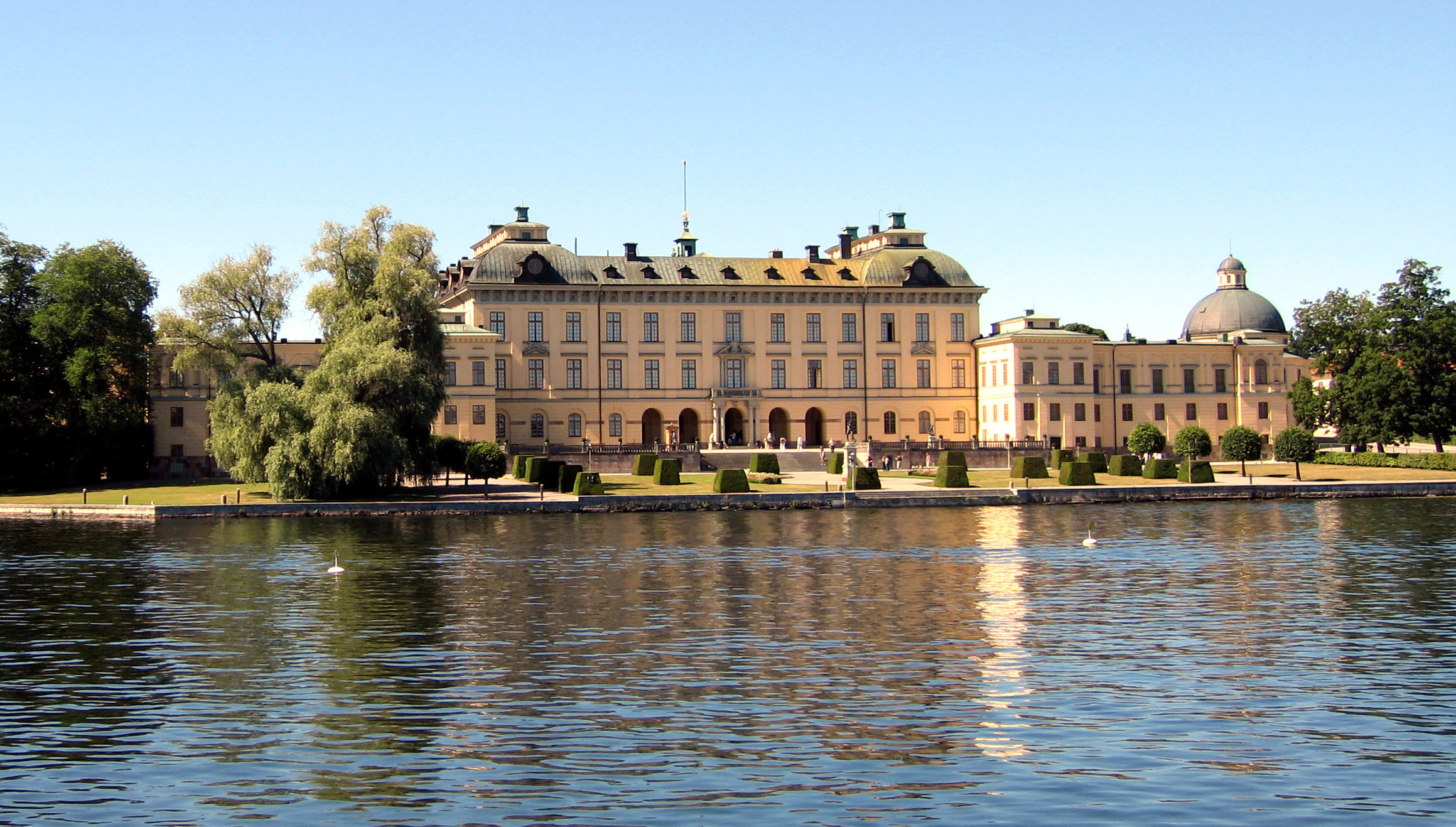
- Drottningholm Palace on Lovön

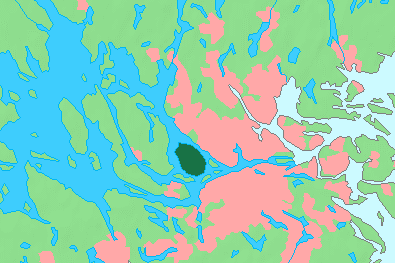
- The Island is highlighted in dark green, Stockholm urban area in pink.

Geography
- Location: Mälaren
- Coordinates: 59°19′30″N 17°50′42″E
- Area: 23.22 km^{2} (8.97 sq mi)

Administration
- Sweden
- County: Stockholm
- Municipality: Ekerö

Lovön is an island in Lake Mälaren in Ekerö Municipality, Stockholm County, Sweden. It was a municipality of its own until 1952, when it was joined with Ekerö Municipality. Lovön's greatest attraction is Drottningholm Palace and its many public gardens, which were built on the island in 1580.

A large part of the island was designated as a World Heritage Site by UNESCO in 1991 for the Drottningholm Palace and surrounding gardens.

== Lovö Runestones ==
There are five early 11th century runestones known as the Lovö Runestones around the island's church.

== Lovö FRA station ==
Lovö island is the headquarter of Försvarets radioanstalt (FRA), the swedish SIGINT-agency. The station is intercepting communication and navigation in the complete baltic region.

Beyond Lovö station, FRA is running fixed sites on several locations within the Swedish territory remotly. Also the data from SIGINT ship HSwMS Artemis by the Swedish Navy and from two S102B Korpen aircraft operated by the Swedish Air Force are proceeded at Lovö.
