= Vanaheim (disambiguation) =

Vanaheimr is a location in Norse mythology.

Vanaheim may also refer to:

- Vanaheim (Conan), a nation in the fictional world of Conan the Barbarian
- Aardvark-Vanaheim, a Canadian comic book company
- Vanaheim (band), a Norwegian musical group
- Vanheimr (song), a song by Danheim for his album Mannavegr
