= Dúrnir =

Dwarf who appears in three Old Norse skaldic poems

Dúrnir (Old Norse: [ˈduːrnez̠]) was a dwarf who appears in the three Old Norse skaldic poems which suggests that he once was a well-known dwarf in Norse mythology.

The most notable poem is known as Ynglingatal:

En dagskjarr
Dúrnis niðja
salvörðuðr
Sveigði vétti,
þá er í stein
enn stórgeði
Dusla konr
ept dvergi hljóp,
ok salr bjartr
þeira Sökmímis
jötunbyggðr
við jöfri gein.

By Diurnir's elfin race,
Who haunt the cliffs and shun day's face,
The valiant Swegde was deceived,
The elf's false words the king believed.
The dauntless hero rushing on,
Passed through the yawning mouth of stone:
It yawned – it shut – the hero fell,
In Saekmime's hall, where giants dwell.

A more literal translation:

The day-fearing
spawn of Durnir
warden of the hall
betrayed Sveigdir
who into stone
the rash hero
ran after the dwarf.
The bright hall
of Soekmimir
built of giants
was enriched
by the chieftain`s presence.

He also appears in a list of Dwarves in the anonymous Dverga heiti:

Alþjófr, austri,
aurvangr ok dúfr,
ái, andvari,
ónn ok draupnir,
dori ok dagfinnr,
dulinn ok ónarr,
alfr ok dellingr,
óinn ok durnir.

The third poem is found in Laufás-Edda:

Kveða skal hróðr fyr hríðar
hræ-blakks viðum sævar,
drykkr var Durnis rekkum
døkkr, ljósara nøkkvi.

Snorri also includes Dúrnir in a list of giants in the Skáldskaparmál section of his Prose Edda (Faulkes translation, p. 157).

It is possible that the name Durnir is an emendation of Durinn, mentioned as the father of dwarves in Dvergatal. Both names mean door, or door-warden. The names Durinn and Durnir do not appear in the same texts. The Norwegian translation of Ynglinga Saga from 1900 uses the name of Durinn instead of Durnir.
