= Fróði's Peace =

Period in Nordic mythology and legend

Fróði's Peace (Old Norse: Fróðafrið) is a semi-legendary period of peace throughout Northern Europe that is referenced in Nordic mythology, skaldic poetry and historical accounts.

== Attestations ==
=== Heimskringla ===
In Snorri Sturluson's euhemeristic account of Ynglinga Saga, the god Freyr is portrayed as a king of Sweden and the progenitor of the Yngling dynasty. After building the Temple at Uppsala and the establishment of Uppsala auðr, Fróði's Peace began and the Swedes experienced good seasons and peace which brought them wealth. They attributed this to Freyr and they worshipped him above all other gods. After the death of the euhemerised Freyr, the peace and good seasons continued and he was buried in a howe. The saga tells that the Swedes believed Fróði's Peace and the good seasons would be maintained as long as Freyr remained in Sweden, refusing to have his body burned and instead continuing to perform blót to him so the good period would continue.

Regarding this, Rudolf Simek states that "it has been realized for a long time that Fróði and Freyr are identical and even Freyr's affinity to Sweden mentioned by Snorri is beyond doubt, as the cult place names (as much as anything) prove."

=== Prose Edda ===
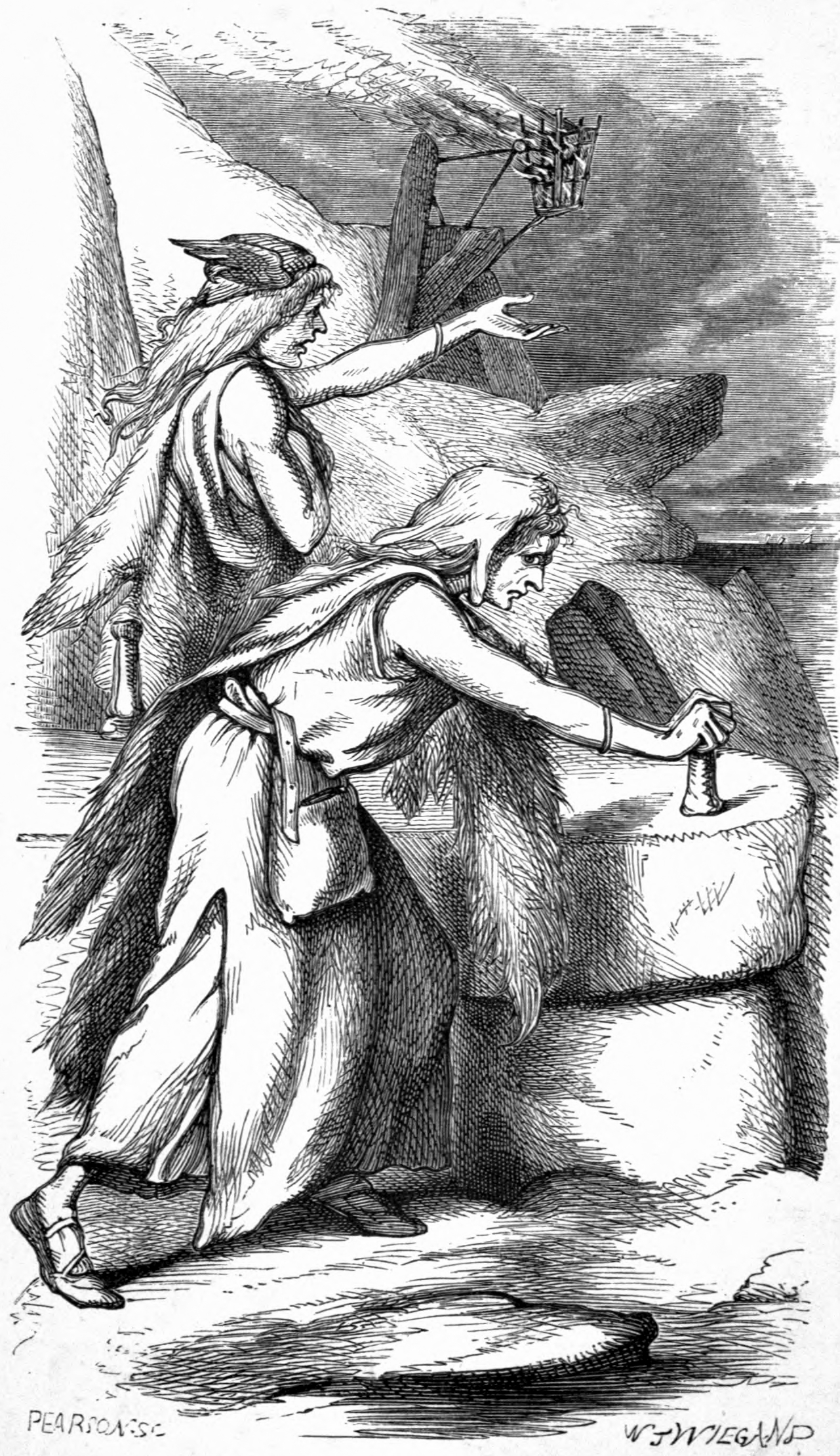
Menia and Fenia by W. J. Wiegand

Snorri Sturluson's prose prologue to Grottasöngr describes that at the time of the birth of Jesus and the Pax Romana, the most powerful king at the time in Northern Europe was the Skjöldung Fróði and the peace was attributed to him.

In contrast to this, Snorri then describes how Frodi in fact was using the jötnar, Fenja and Menja, who he bought from the Yngling, King Fjölnir of Sweden to grind peace, gold and happiness from an enchanted millstone. Following this, feuding ceased. Theft would also not occur and a ring left on Jelling heath would lie for a long time.

After being overworked, Fenja and Menja use the mill to summon an army to free them and kill the king, ending Fróði's Peace.

=== Gesta Danorum ===
In Gesta Danorum Book 5, chapter 12, Saxo Grammaticus describes a Danish king named Frode. After establishing rule of Scandinavia, the British Isles, the Huns and the Slavs he enacts strict penalties for theft and orders for golden rings to be hung up on highways in Jutland, the centre of his realm, as a test of his subjects' honesty. Following this, peace is maintained for thirty years.

In accordance with Snorri, Saxo Grammaticus estimates the time of Fróði's Peace to around the birth of Jesus, to which he also attributes a period of world peace.

=== Vellekla ===
In the drápa Vellekla, the skald Einarr Helgason skálaglamm praises the ruler Haakon Jarl:

Engi varð á jǫrðu
ættum góðr nema Fróði
gæti-Njǫrðr, sás gerði,
geirbríkar, frið slíkan.

Translation:

No well-descended guarding-Njǫrðr of the spear-board [warrior]
lived on earth who made such peace, except Fróði.

=== Helgakviða Hundingsbana I ===
In the poem Helgakviða Hundingsbana I, Fróði's Peace is used as a heiti for calm before a battle.

Fara hildingar hjörstefnu til,
þeirar er lögðu at Logafjöllum;
sleit Fróða frið fjánda á milli;
fara Viðris grey valgjörn of ey.

— Old Norse text
Translation:

The chieftains go to a sword-meeting [battle],
which was set up as Fire-fells;
Fródi's peace was rent between foes,
Vidrir's bitches [wolves] go corpse-eager over the island.

— Orchard Translation

== See also ==
- Golden Age - Mythical ideal periods set in the past

== Bibliography ==
=== Primary ===
- Brodeur, Arthur Gilchrist (1916). The Prose Edda of Snorri Sturlson. New York, The American-Scandinavian Foundation. ISBN 9798534277388.
- Grammaticus, Saxo. "The Danish History". Wikisource.
- Laing, Samuel (1961). Heimskringla. Part two, Sagas of the Norse Kings. London: Dent. ISBN 0460008471.
- Marold, Edith (2012). "Einarr skálaglamm Helgason, Vellekla". Skaldic Poetry of the Scandinavian Middle Ages.
- Orchard, Andy (2011). The Elder Edda : a book of Viking lore. London: Penguin Books. ISBN 9780141393728.
- "Ynglinga saga". heimskringla.no.
- "Helgakviða Hundingsbana I". heimskringla.no.

=== Secondary ===
- Simek, Rudolf (2008). A Dictionary of Northern Mythology. Translated by Hall, Angela. BOYE6. ISBN 9780859915137.
