= Fjölnir =

Legendary King of Sweden

Legendary King of Sweden
- Predecessor: Yngvi-Frey
- Successor: Sveigder
- Died: Lejre, Roskilde, Zealand, Denmark (fell in a vessel of mead and drowned)
- Issue Detail: Sveigder
- Dynasty: House of Yngling
- Father: Yngvi-Frey

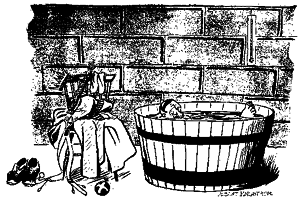
King Fjolner prepares to drown in the vessel of mead. He exclaims: I hope that the historian Odhner will describe this as an accident. (Caricature by Albert Engström)

Fjölnir (Old Norse: Fjǫlnir [ˈfjɔlnez̠]) is a legendary king in Norse mythology said to have been the son of Freyr (Frey) and his consort Gerðr (Gertha). The name appears in a variety of forms, including Fiolnir, Fjölner, Fjolner, and Fjolne. He was claimed as the progenitor of the Swedish Yngling dynasty, reigning from Gamla Uppsala. According to the Grottasöngr, Fjölnir lived from the 1st century BC to the early 1st century AD.

Fjölnir was said to have drowned in a vat of mead while visiting Peace-Fróði, a similarly legendary king of Zealand, the Danish island. Fjölnir was then succeeded by his son Sveigðir.

== Name ==
The etymology of the Old Norse name Fjǫlnir is unclear. It could stem from the verb fela ('to hide'), with Fjǫlnir as 'the concealer [of the mead of poetry]', or it may have emerged as an abbreviation of fjǫlviðr ('the very wise'). A derivation from fjǫl ('crowd') has also been proposed, with Fjǫlnir as the 'manifold' or the 'multiplier', although such an adverbial formation has no attested parallel. According to Lindow, the second etymology may be more fitting for a name of Odin, but the meaning remains uncertain in any case.

Fjölnir is indeed also frequently mentioned as a name of Odin. In Grímnismál ('The Lay of Grímnir'), Odin mentions it to Geirröðr as one of his many names that constitute the beginning of his epiphany. In Reginsmál ('The Lay of Reginn'), a man who is clearly Odin uses Fjölnir to refer to himself as he is standing on a mountain addressing Sigurd and Regin. In Gylfaginning ('The Beguiling of Gylfi'), Fjölnir appears among the 12 names given for Alfödr, another name of Odin.

== Attestations ==
=== Grottasöngr ===
Grottasöngr informs that Fjölnir was the contemporary of Caesar Augustus (63 BC – AD 14). He was a mighty king and the crops were bountiful and peace was maintained. At his time, King Fróði, the son of Friðleifr, ruled in Lejre in Zealand. Grottasöngr relates that when Fróði once visited Uppsala he brought two giantesses, Fenja and Menja:

Fróði konungr sótti heimboð í Svíþjóð til þess konungs, er Fjölnir er nefndr. Þá keypti hann ambáttir tvær, er hétu Fenja ok Menja. Þær váru miklar ok sterkar.

However, the two giantesses were to be his undoing (see Grottasöngr).

=== Ynglinga saga ===
The Ynglinga saga tells that Fjölnir was the son of Freyr himself and his wife Gerd, but he was the first of his house who was not to be deified.

Freyr tók þá ríki eptir Njörð; var hann kallaðr dróttinn yfir Svíum ok tók skattgjafir af þeim; hann var vinsæll ok ársæll sem faðir hans. Freyr reisti at Uppsölum hof mikit, ok setti þar höfuðstað sinn; lagði þar til allar skyldir sínar, lönd ok lausa aura; þá hófst Uppsala auðr, ok hefir haldizt æ síðan. Á hans dögum hófst Fróða friðr, þá var ok ár um öll lönd; kendu Svíar þat Frey. Var hann því meir dýrkaðr en önnur goðin, sem á hans dögum varð landsfólkit auðgara en fyrr af friðinum ok ári. Gerðr Gýmis dóttir hét kona hans; sonr þeirra hét Fjölnir.

Frey took the kingdom after Njord, and was called drot by the Swedes, and they paid taxes to him. He was, like his father, fortunate in friends and in good seasons. Frey built a great temple at Upsal, made it his chief seat, and gave it all his taxes, his land, and goods. Then began the Upsal domains, which have remained ever since. Then began in his days the Frode- peace; and then there were good seasons, in all the land, which the Swedes ascribed to Frey, so that he was more worshipped than the other gods, as the people became much richer in his days by reason of the peace and good seasons. His wife was called Gerd, daughter of Gymir, and their son was called Fjolne.

Then Snorri tells that after Freyr's death, Fjölnir became the king of Sweden. However, he drowned in a vat of mead visiting Peace-Fróði (Friðfróði), the king of Zealand.

Fjölnir, son Yngvifreys, réð þá fyrir Svíum ok Uppsala auð; hann var ríkr ok ársæll ok friðsæll. Þá var Friðfróði at Hleiðru; þeirra í millum var heimboð ok vingan. Þá er Fjölnir fór til Fróða á Selund, þá var þar fyrir búin veizla mikil ok boðit til víða um lönd. Fróði átti mikinn húsabœ; þar var gert ker mikit margra alna hátt, ok okat með stórum timbrstokkum; þat stóð í undirskemmu, en lopt var yfir uppi, ok opit gólfþilit, svá at þar var niðr hellt leginum, en kerit blandit fult mjaðar; þar var drykkr furðu sterkr. Um kveldit var Fjölni fylgt til herbergis í hit næsta lopt, ok hans sveit með honum. Um nóttina gékk hann út í svalir at leita sér staðar, var hann svefnœrr ok dauðadrukkinn. En er hann snerist aptr til herbergis, þá gékk hann fram eptir svölunum ok til annarra loptdura ok þar inn, missti þá fótum ok féll í mjaðarkerit, ok týndist þar.

Fjolne, Yngve Frey's son, ruled thereafter over the Swedes and the Upsal domains. He was powerful, and lucky in seasons and in holding the peace. Fredfrode ruled then in Leidre, and between them there was great friendship and visiting. Once when Fjolne went to Frode in Sealand, a great feast was prepared for him, and invitations to it were sent all over the country. Frode had a large house, in which there was a great vessel many ells high, and put together of great pieces of timber; and this vessel stood in a lower room. Above it was a loft, in the floor of which was an opening through which liquor was poured into this vessel. The vessel was full of mead, which was excessively strong. In the evening Fjolne, with his attendants, was taken into the adjoining loft to sleep. In the night he went out to the gallery to seek a certain place, and he was very sleepy and exceedingly drunk. As he came back to his room he went along the gallery to the door of another left, went into it, and his foot slipping, he fell into the vessel of mead and was drowned.

=== Ynglingatal ===
Snorri also quoted some lines of Ynglingatal, composed in the 9th century:

Varð framgengt,
þars Fróði bjó,
feigðarorð,
es at Fjǫlni kom.
Ok sikling
svigðis geira
vágr vindlauss
of viða skyldi.

Translation: ‘The word of doom that fell upon Fjǫlnir was fulfilled where Fróði lived. And the windless wave of the spears of the bull [HORNS > BEER] was to destroy the prince.’

The Historia Norwegiæ provides a Latin summary of Ynglingatal, which precedes Snorri's quotation. It also informs that Fjölnir was the son of Freyr, the father of Svegder and that he drowned in a vat of mead:

Froyr vero genuit Fiolni, qui in dolio medonis dimersus est, cujus filius Swegthir [...]

Frøy engendered Fjolne, who was drowned in a tun of mead. His son, Sveigde, [...]

The even earlier source Íslendingabók cites the line of descent in Ynglingatal and also gives Fjölnir as the successor of Freyr and the predecessor of Svegðir. In addition to this it summarizes that Fjölnir died at Friðfróði's (i.e. Peace-Fróði): iii Freyr. iiii Fjölnir. sá er dó at Friðfróða. v Svegðir:.

=== Gesta Danorum ===
In Gesta Danorum, Book 1, Frodi corresponds to Hadingus and Fjölnir to Hundingus, but the story is a little different. It relates how King Hundingus of Sweden believed a rumor that King Hadingus of Denmark had died and held his obsequies with ceremony, including an enormous vat of ale. Hundingus himself served the ale, but accidentally stumbled and fell into the vat, choked, and drowned. When word came to King Hadingus of this unfortunate death, King Hadingus publicly hanged himself (see Freyr).

=== Ballad of Veraldur ===
Dumézil (1973, Appendix I) cites a Faroese ballad recorded in 1840 about Odin and his son Veraldur. It is believed that this Veraldur is related to Fjölnir and Freyr, as per Snorri's statement that Freyr was veraldar goð ("god of the world").

In this ballad Veraldur sets off to Zealand to seek the king's daughter in marriage despite Odin's warnings. The king of Zealand dislikes Veraldur and tricks him into falling into a brewing vat in a "hall of stone" where Veraldur drowns. When Odin hears the news, he decides to die and go to Asgard where his followers will also be welcomed after death.

The tale is similar to that of the death of Fjölnir, son of Freyr, who accidentally fell into a vat of mead and drowned while paying a friendly visit to Fridfródi the ruler of Zealand.

== Notes ==
=== Bibliography ===
- de Vries, Jan (1962). Altnordisches Etymologisches Worterbuch (1977 ed.). Brill. ISBN 978-90-04-05436-3.
- Lindow, John (2001). Norse Mythology: A Guide to Gods, Heroes, Rituals, and Beliefs. Oxford University Press. ISBN 978-0-19-983969-8.
- McKinnell, John (2005). Meeting the Other in Norse Myth and Legend. DS Brewer. ISBN 978-1-84384-042-8.
- Orchard, Andy (1997). Dictionary of Norse Myth and Legend. Cassell. ISBN 978-0-304-34520-5.

== See also ==
- Ynglingatal
- Ynglinga saga (part of the Heimskringla)
- Historia Norvegiæ
- Gróttasöngr
- Gesta Danorum

Fjölnir House of Yngling
Preceded by Yngvi-Freyr	Mythological king of Sweden	Succeeded by Sveigðir
