= Sökkmímir =

Figure in Norse mythology

Sökkmímir (Old Norse: Søkkmímir, probably "Mimir of the depth", lit. 'Sunk-Mimir') was a jötunn who appears in two sources from Norse mythology, suggesting that he was once a well-known jötunn in Scandinavia.

In Grímnismál, stanza 50, it appears that Odin killed the jötunn:

Sviðurr ok Sviðrir er ek hét at Søkkmímis, ok dulða ek þann inn alda iötun, þá er ek Miðviðnis vark ins mæra burar orðinn einbani.	So. I deceived the giant Sokkmimir old As Svithur and Svithrir of yore; Of Mithvitnir's son the slayer I was When the famed one found his doom.	Svidur and Svidrir I was at Sökkmimir's called, and beguiled that ancient Jötun, when of Midvitnir's renowned son I was the sole destroyer.

He notably appears in Ynglingatal, where subterranean abodes of jötnar are called Sökkmímir's halls:

En dagskjarr Dúrnis niðja salvörðuðr Sveigði vétti, þá er í stein enn stórgeði Dusla konr ept dvergi hljóp, ok salr bjartr þeira Sökmímis jötunbyggðr við jöfri gein.	By Diurnir's elfin race, Who haunt the cliffs and shun day's face, The valiant Swegde was deceived, The elf's false words the king believed. The dauntless hero rushing on, Passed through the yawning mouth of stone: It yawned – it shut – the hero fell, In Saekmime's hall, where giants dwell.
