= Huld =

Woman who practiced the seiðr

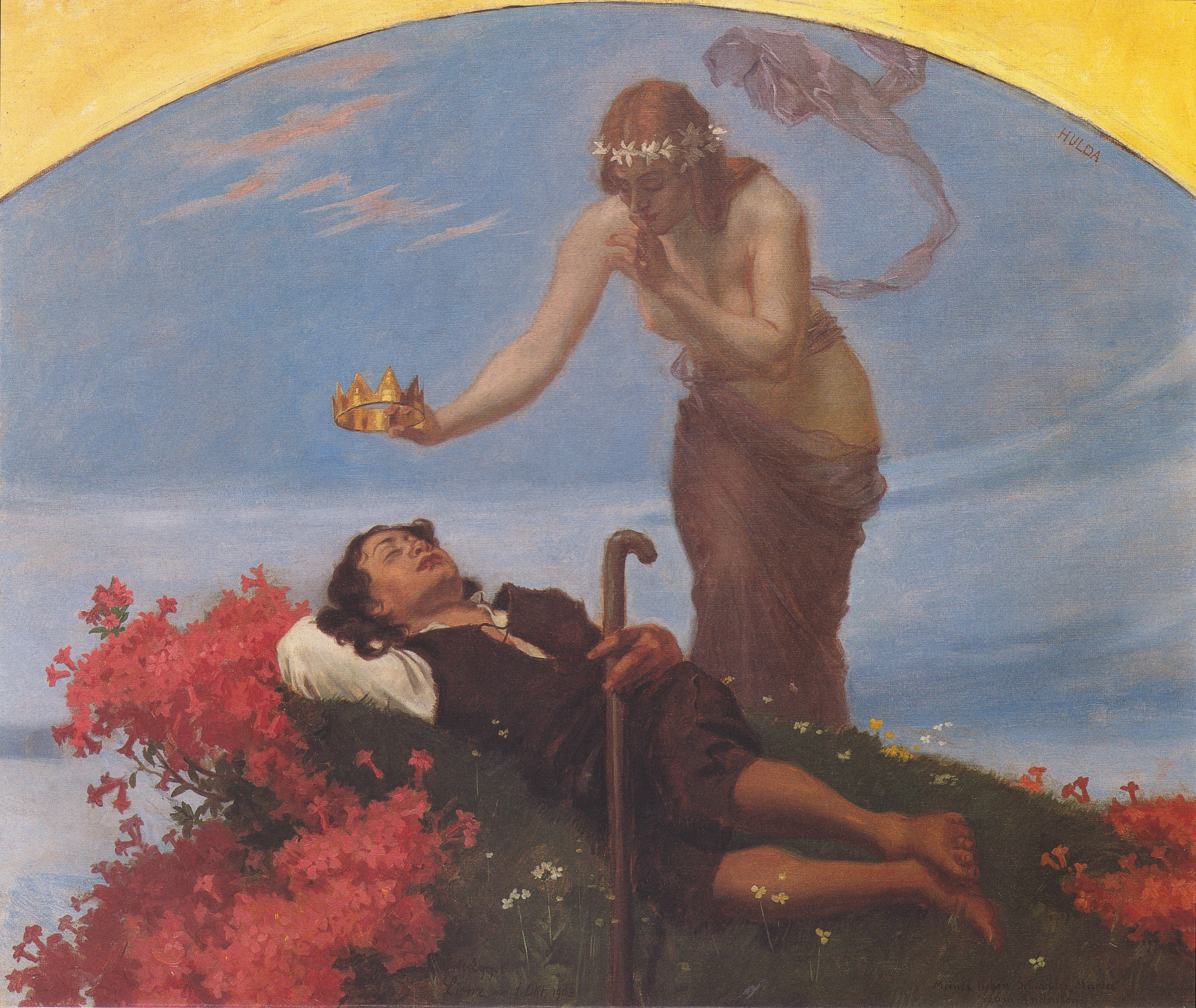
Albin Egger-Lienz: Hulda. Oil on canvas, 1903.

In Scandinavian mythology, Huld is a völva or seiðkona, that is a woman who practiced seiðr (divination). She is mentioned in the Ynglinga saga, Sturlunga saga and a late medieval Icelandic tale. In the latter source, she is Odin's mistress and the mother of the demi-goddesses Þorgerðr and Irpa. As her name suggests, Huld may be in origin the same being as the Hulder and the German Holda.

== Attestations ==
In the Ynglinga saga it is related that she was first hired to kill the Swedish king Vanlade, by his wife Drífa. She "hag-rode" him to death.

Vanlandi hét son Svegðis, er ríki tók eptir hann ok réð fyrir Uppsala auð; hann var hermaðr mikill, ok hann fór víða um lönd. Hann þá vetrvist á Finnlandi með Snjá hinum gamla, ok fékk þar dóttur hans Drífu. En at vári fór hann á brott, en Drífa var eptir, ok hét hann at koma aptr á þriggja vetra fresti; en hann kom eigi á 10 vetrum. Þá sendi Drífa eptir Huld seiðkonu, en sendi Vísbur, son þeirra Vanlanda, til Svíþjóðar. Drífa keypti at Huld seiðkonu, at hon skyldi síða Vanlanda til Finnlands, eða deyða hann at öðrum kosti. En er seiðr var framiðr, þá var Vanlandi at Uppsölum; þá gerði hann fúsan at fara til Finnlands, en vinir hans ok ráðamenn bönnuðu honum, ok sögðu at vera mundi fjölkyngi Finna í farfýsi hans. Þá gerðist honum svefnhöfugt, ok lagðist hann till svefns. En er hann hafði lítt sofnat, kallaði hann ok sagði, at mara trað hann. Menn hans fóru til ok vildu hjálpa honum; en er þeir tóku uppi til höfuðsins, þá trað hon fótleggina, svá at nær brotnuðu; þá tóku þeir til fótanna, þá kafði hon höfuðit, svá at þar dó hann. Svíar tóku lík hans, ok var hann brendr við á þá er Skúta heitir. Þar váru settir bautasteinar hans.

Vanlande, Swegde's son, succeeded his father, and ruled over the Upsal domain. He was a great warrior, and went far around in different lands. Once he took up his winter abode in Lapland with Snae the Old, and got his daughter Driva in marriage; but in spring he set out leaving Driva behind, and although he had promised to return within three years he did not come back for ten. Then Driva sent a message to the witch Huld; and sent Visbur, her son by Vanlande, to Sweden. Driva bribed the witch-wife Huld, either that she should bewitch Vanlande to return to Finland, or kill him. When this witch-work was going on Vanlande was at Upsal, and a great desire came over him to go to Finland; but his friends and counsellors advised him against it, and said the witchcraft of the Finn people showed itself in this desire of his to go there. He then became very drowsy, and laid himself down to sleep; but when he had slept but a little while he cried out, saying that the Mara was treading upon him. His men hastened to him to help him; but when they took hold of his head she trod on his legs, and when they laid hold of his legs she pressed upon his head; and it was his death. The Swedes took his body and burnt it at a river called Skytaa, where a standing stone was raised over him.

Snorri also quoted some lines from Ynglingatal composed in the 9th century:

En á vit Vilja bróður vitta véttr Vanlanda kom, þá er trollkund of troða skyldi liðs grímhildr ljóna bága; ok sá brann á beði Skútu menglötuðr, er mara kvalði.	And Vanlande, in a fatal hour, Was dragg'd by Grimhild's daughter's power, The witch-wife's, to the dwelling-place Where men meet Odin face to face. Trampled to death, to Skytaa's shore The corpse his faithful followers bore; And there they burnt, with heavy hearts, The good chief killed by witchcraft's arts.

Later she was hired by Vanlade's grandchildren to kill his son Visbur.

Vísburr tók arf eptir Vanlanda föður sinn; hann gékk at eiga dóttur Auða hins auðga ok gaf henni at mundi þrjá stórbœi ok gullmen. Þau áttu 2 sonu, Gisl ok Öndur. En Vísburr lét hana eina ok fékk annarrar konu; en hon fór til föður síns með sonu sína. Vísbur átti son er Dómaldi hét; stjúpmóðir Dómalda lét síða at honum úgæfu. En er synir Vísburs váru 12 vetra ok 13, fóru þeir á fund hans ok heimtu mund móður sinnar, en hann vildi eigi gjalda. Þá mæltu þeir, at gullmenit skyldi verða at bana hinum bezta manni í ætt hans, ok fóru í brott ok heim. Þá var enn fengit at seið ok siðit til þess, at þeir skyldu mega drepa föður sinn. Þá sagði Huldr völva þeim, at hon mundi svá síða, ok þat með, at ættvíg skyldu ávalt vera í ætt þeirra Ynglinga síðan. Þeir játtu því. Eptir þat sömnuðu þeir liði, ok kómu at Vísbur um nótt á úvart ok brendu hann inni.

Visbur succeeded his father Vanlande. He married the daughter of Aude the Rich, and gave her as her bride-gift three large farms, and a gold ornament. They had two sons, Gisle and Ond; but Visbur left her and took another wife, whereupon she went home to her father with her two sons. Visbur had a son who was called Domald, and his stepmother used witchcraft to give him ill-luck. Now, when Visbur's sons were the one twelve and the other thirteen years of age, they went to their father's place, and desired to have their mother's dower; but he would not deliver it to them. Then they said that the gold ornament should be the death of the best man in all his clan, and they returned home. Then they began again with enchantments and witchcraft, to try if they could destroy their father. The sorceress Huld said that by witchcraft she could bring it about by this means, that a murderer of his own kin should never be wanting in the Yngling clan; and they agreed to have it so. Thereafter they collected men, came unexpectedly in the night on Visbur, and burned him in his house.

It is said in Sturlunga saga that Sturla Þórðarson entertained King Magnús lagabœtir with a story about Huld in 1263, which he told "better and more cleverly than any of those present had heard before" (betr ok fróðligar en nokkurr þeira hafði fyrr heyrt, er þar váru). According to Sturlunga saga, the story was about a great troll-woman and was well received by the king's followers and by the queen; it took a good part of the day to tell.

== Sources ==
- Ynglinga saga
