= Sveigðir =

Legendary King of Sweden

Legendary King of Sweden
- Predecessor: Fjölnir
- Successor: Vanlandi
- Spouse: Vana
- Issue: Vanlandi
- Dynasty: House of Yngling
- Father: Fjölnir

Sveigðir, Sveigder or Swegde (Old Norse "Waving One") was a Swedish king of the House of Yngling in Norse mythology. He was the son of Fjölner, whom he succeeded as king, and he married Vana of Vanaheimr, probably one of the Vanir. Lured by a dwarf, Sveigðir disappeared into a stone and never came back. He was succeeded by his son Vanlandi.

== Attestations ==
Snorri Sturluson wrote of Sveigðir in his Ynglinga saga (1225):

Svegðir tók ríki eptir föður sinn; hann strengði þess heit at leita Goðheims ok Óðins hins gamla. Hann fór með 12 menn víða um heiminn, hann kom út í Tyrkland ok í Svíþjóð hina miklu ok hitti þar marga frændr sína ok vini, ok var í þeirri för 5 vetr. Þá kom hann aptr til Svíþjóðar, dvaldist hann þá enn heima um hríð. Hann hafði fengit konu þá er Vana hét út í Vanaheimi; var þeirra son Vanlandi. Svegðir fór enn at leita Goðheims. Ok í austanverðri Svíþjóð heitir bœr mikill at Steini, þar er steinn svá mikill sem stór hús. Um kveldit eptir sólarfall, þá er Svegðir gékk frá drykkju til svefnbúrs, sá hann til steinsins, at dvergr sat undir steininum. Svegðir ok hans menn váru mjök druknir ok runnu til steinsins. Dvergrinn stóð í durum ok kallaði á Sveigði, bað hann þar inn ganga, ef hann vildi Óðin hitta. Svegðir hljóp í steininn; en steinninn laukst þegar aptr, ok kom Svegðir eigi aptr.

Swegde took the kingdom after his father, and he made a solemn vow to seek Godheim and Odin. He went with twelve men through the world, and came to Turkland, and the Great Svithiod, where he found many of his connections. He was five years on this journey; and when he returned home to Sweden he remained there for some time. He had got a wife in Vanaheim, who was called Vana, and their son was Vanlande. Swegde went out afterwards to seek again for Godheim, and came to a mansion on the east side of Swithiod called Stein, where there was a stone as big as a large house. In the evening after sunset, as Swegde was going from the drinking-table to his sleeping-room, he cast his eye upon the stone, and saw that a dwarf was sitting under it. Swegde and his man were very drunk, and they ran towards the stone. The dwarf stood in the door, and called to Swegde, and told him to come in, and he should see Odin. Swegde ran into the stone, which instantly closed behind him, and Swegde never came back.

Snorri also quoted some lines from Ynglingatal composed in the 9th century:

En dagskjarr Dúrnis niðja salvörðuðr Sveigði vétti, þá er í stein enn stórgeði Dusla konr ept dvergi hljóp, ok salr bjartr þeira Sökmímis jötunbyggðr við jöfri gein.	By Diurnir's elfin race, Who haunt the cliffs and shun day's face, The valiant Swegde was deceived, The elf's false words the king believed. The dauntless hero rushing on, Passed through the yawning mouth of stone: It yawned – it shut – the hero fell, In Saekmime's hall, where giants dwell.

The Historia Norwegiæ presents a Latin summary of Ynglingatal written in the late 12th century and consequently older than Snorri's quotation:

Froyr vero genuit Fiolni, qui in dolio medonis dimersus est, cujus filius Swegthir nanum in petram persequitur nec redisse dicitur, quod pro certo fabulosum creditur. Iste genuit Wanlanda [...]

Frøy engendered Fjolne, who was drowned in a tun of mead. His son, Sveigde, is supposed to have pursued a dwarf into a stone and never to have returned, but this is plainly to be taken as a fairy-tale. He sired Vanlande, [...]

The even earlier source Íslendingabók from the early 12th century, cites the line of descent in Ynglingatal and also gives Svegðir as the successor of Fjölnir and the predecessor of Vanlandi: iiii Fjölnir. sá er dó at Friðfróða. v Svegðir. vi Vanlandi.

== Sources ==
- Ynglingatal
- Ynglinga saga (part of the Heimskringla)
- Historia Norwegiae

Sveigðir House of Yngling
Preceded by Fjölnir	Mythological king of Sweden	Succeeded by Vanlandi
