= Aun =

Mythical Swedish king

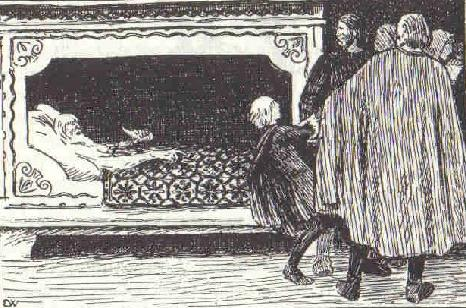
Illustration by Erik Werenskiold, from the first edition of Gustav Storm's Norwegian translation of Heimskringla (published 1899).

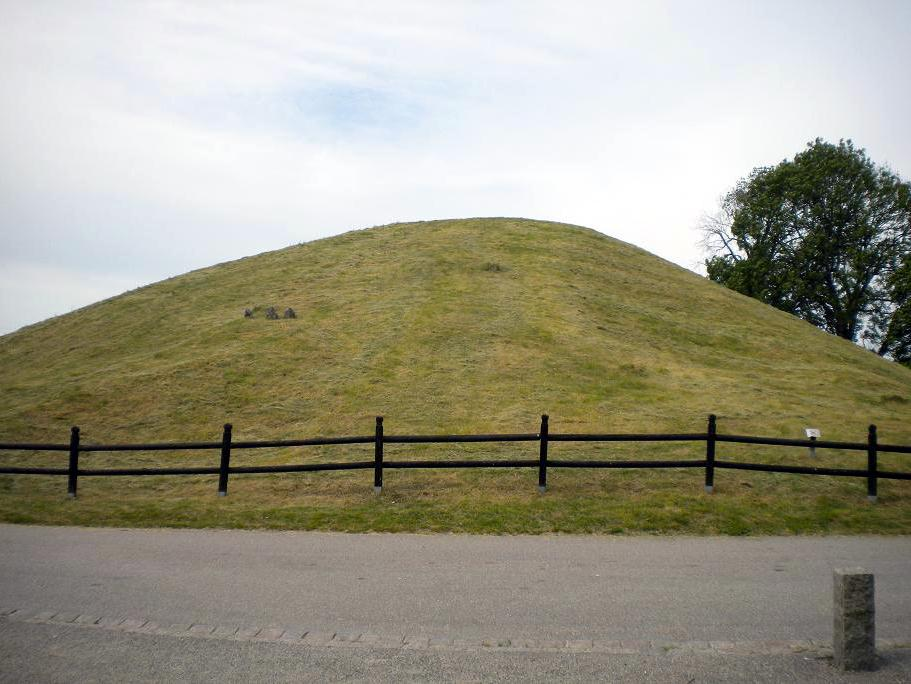
East royal tumulus at Old Upsala, suggested grave of King Edwin the Old

Aun the Old (Old Norse Aunn inn gamli, Latinized Auchun, Proto-Norse *Audawiniʀ: English: "Edwin the Old") is a mythical Swedish king of the House of Yngling in the Heimskringla. Aun was the son of Jorund, and had ten sons, nine of which he was said to have sacrificed in order to prolong his own life. Based on the internal chronology of the House of Yngling, Aun would have died late in the fifth century. He was succeeded by his son Egil Vendelcrow (Íslendingabók: Egill Vendilkráka) identified with Ongentheow of the Beowulf narrative and placed in the early sixth century.

== Ynglingatal ==
Ruling from his seat in Uppsala, Aun was reputedly a wise king who made sacrifices to the gods. However, he was not of a warlike disposition and preferred to live in peace. He was attacked and defeated by the Danish prince Halfdan. Aun fled to the Geats in Västergötland, where he stayed for 25 years until Halfdan died in his bed in Uppsala.

Upon Halfdan's death Aun returned to Uppsala. Aun was now 60 years old, and in an attempt to live longer he sacrificed his son to Odin, who had promised that this would mean he would live for another 60 years. After 25 years, Aun was attacked by Halfdan's cousin Ale the Strong. Aun lost several battles and had to flee a second time to Västergötland. Ale the Strong ruled in Uppsala for 25 years until he was killed by Starkad the old.

After Ale the Strong's death, Aun once again returned to Uppsala and once again sacrificed a son to Odin; this time Odin told the king that he would remain living as long as he sacrificed a son every ten years and that he had to name one of the Swedish provinces after the number of sons he sacrificed.

When Aun had sacrificed a son for the seventh time, he was so old that he could not walk but had to be carried on a chair. When he had sacrificed a son for the eighth time, he could no longer get out of his bed. When he had sacrificed his ninth son, he was so old that he had to feed, like a little child, by suckling on a horn.

After ten years he wanted to sacrifice his tenth and last son and name the province of Uppsala The Ten Lands. However, the Swedes refused to allow him to make this sacrifice and so he died. He was buried in a mound at Uppsala and succeeded by his last son Egil. From that day, dying in bed of old age was called Aun's sickness.

Knátti endr
at Uppsǫlum
ánasótt
Aun of standa.
Ok þrálífr
þiggja skyldi
jóðs alað
ǫðru sinni.
Ok sveiðurs
at sér hverfði
mækis hlut
inn mjávara,
es okhreins
ôttunga rjóðr
lǫgðis odd
liggjandi drakk.
Máttit hárr
hjarðar mæki
austrkonungr
upp of halda.

‘Decrepitude long ago overtook Aunn at Uppsala. And the one tenacious of life had to receive the food of an infant a second time. And he turned the narrower part of the sword of the bull [HORN] toward himself when the reddener of kinsmen [Aunn] drank lying down [from] the tip of the sword of the yoke-reindeer [BULL > HORN]. The grey-haired eastern king could not hold up the sword of the bull [HORN].’

== Historia Norwegiæ ==
The Historia Norwegiæ presents a Latin summary of Ynglingatal, older than Snorri's quotation (continuing after Jorund):

Iste genuit Auchun, qui longo vetustatis senio IX annis ante obitum suum densæ usum alimoniæ postponens lac tantum de cornu ut infans suxisse fertur. Auchun vero genuit Eigil cognomento Vendilcraco [...]

He became the father of Aukun, who, in the feebleness of a protracted old age, during the nine years before his death is said to have abandoned the consumption of solid food and only sucked milk from a horn, like a babe-in-arms. Aukun's son was Egil Vendelkråke, [...]

== Primary sources ==
- Ynglingatal
- Ynglinga saga (part of the Heimskringla)
- Historia Norwegiae

== Secondary sources ==
Nerman, B. Det svenska rikets uppkomst. Stockholm, 1925.

Aun House of Yngling
Preceded by Jorund	Mythological king of Sweden; First reign	Succeeded by Halfdan
Preceded by Halfdan	Mythological king of Sweden; Second reign	Succeeded by Ale the Strong
Preceded by Ale the Strong	Mythological king of Sweden; Third reign	Succeeded by Egil Vendelcrow
