= Vanlandi =

Legendary King of Sweden

Legendary King of Sweden
- Predecessor: Sveigðir
- Successor: Visbur
- Burial: By the Skúta river
- Spouse: Drífa
- Issue: Visbur
- Dynasty: House of Yngling
- Father: Sveigðir
- Mother: Vana

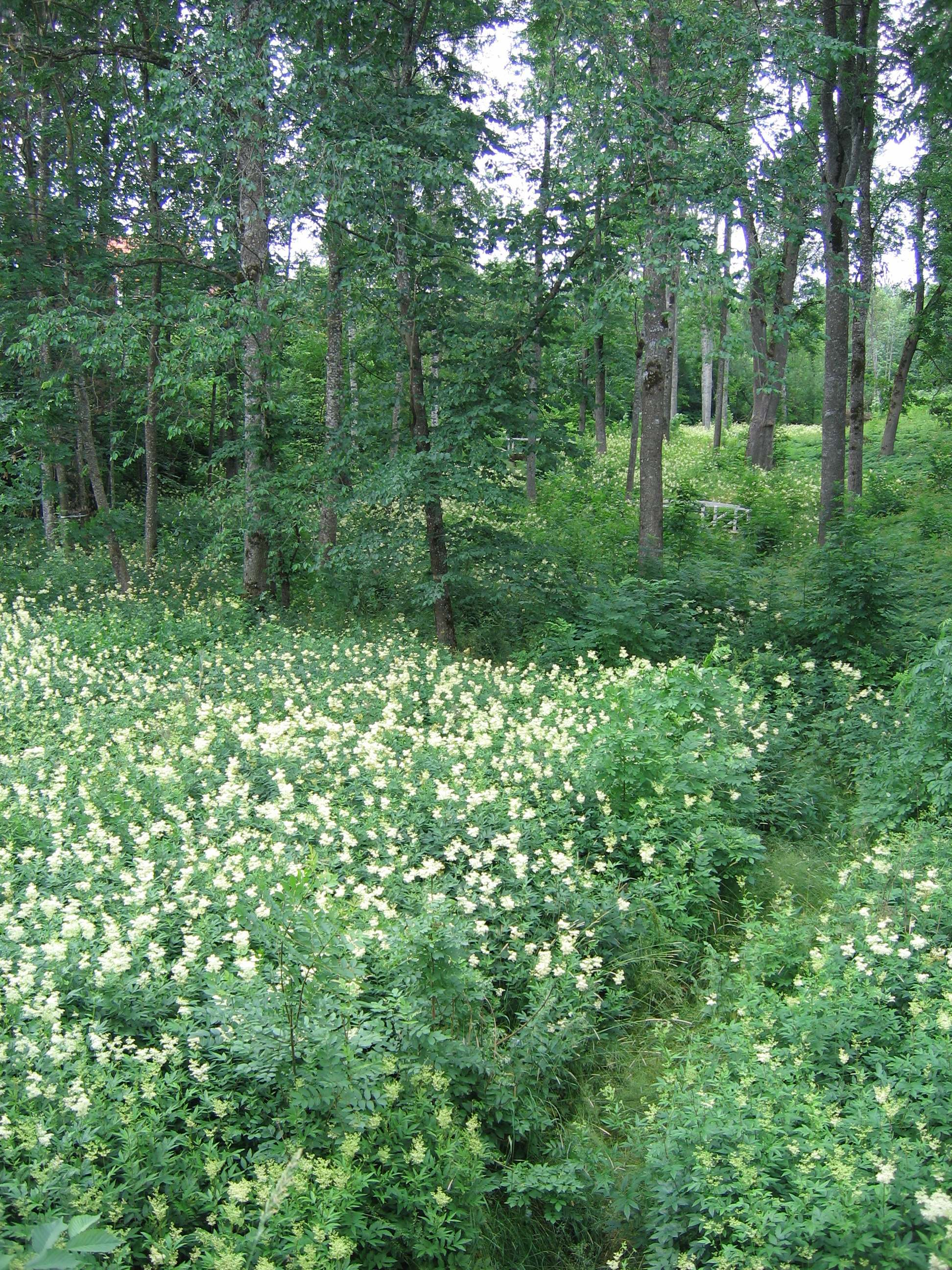
Vanlandi was burned by the river Skúta/Skytaa/Skutån ("shooting creek"). In the summer, the creek hardly merits the name, and today it is called Skuttungeån.

Vanlandi or Vanlande (Old Norse: "Man from the Land of the Vanir") was, according to Norse mythology, a Swedish king who ruled at Uppsala as part of the House of Yngling. He was the son of Sveigðir, whom he succeeded as king.

Vanlandi married a woman named Drífa from Finnland but later abandoned her. In retaliation, Drífa sought revenge by enlisting a sorceress to curse him. As a result, Vanlandi was hag-ridden to death. He was succeeded by his son, Visbur.

== Attestations ==
Snorri Sturluson wrote of Vanlandi in his Ynglinga saga (1225) (note that the translator has rendered Finnland as Finland):

Vanlandi hét son Svegðis, er ríki tók eptir hann ok réð fyrir Uppsala auð; hann var hermaðr mikill, ok hann fór víða um lönd. Hann þá vetrvist á Finnlandi með Snjá hinum gamla, ok fékk þar dóttr hans Drífu. En at vári fór hann á brott, en Drífa var eptir, ok hét hann at koma aptr á þriggja vetra fresti; en hann kom eigi á 10 vetrum. Þá sendi Drífa eptir Huld seiðkonu, en sendi Vísbur, son þeirra Vanlanda, til Svíþjóðar. Drífa keypti at Huld seiðkonu, at hon skyldi síða Vanlanda til Finnlands, eða deyða hann at öðrum kosti. En er seiðr var framiðr, þá var Vanlandi at Uppsölum; þá gerði hann fúsan at fara til Finnlands, en vinir hans ok ráðamenn bönnuðu honum, ok sögðu at vera mundi fjölkyngi Finna í farfýsi hans. Þá gerðist honum svefnhöfugt, ok lagðist hann till svefns. En er hann hafði lítt sofnat, kallaði hann ok sagði, at mara trað hann. Menn hans fóru til ok vildu hjálpa honum; en er þeir tóku uppi til höfuðsins, þá trað hon fótleggina, svá at nær brotnuðu; þá tóku þeir til fótanna, þá kafði hon höfuðit, svá at þar dó hann. Svíar tóku lík hans, ok var hann brendr við á þá er Skúta heitir. Þar váru settir bautasteinar hans.

Vanlande, Swegde's son, succeeded his father, and ruled over the Upsal domain. He was a great warrior, and went far around in different lands. Once he took up his winter abode in Finland with Snae the Old, and got his daughter Driva in marriage; but in spring he set out leaving Driva behind, and although he had promised to return within three years he did not come back for ten. Then Driva sent a message to the witch Huld; and sent Visbur, her son by Vanlande, to Sweden. Driva bribed the witch- wife Huld, either that she should bewitch Vanlande to return to Finland, or kill him. When this witch-work was going on Vanlande was at Upsal, and a great desire came over him to go to Finland; but his friends and counsellors advised him against it, and said the witchcraft of the Finn people showed itself in this desire of his to go there. He then became very drowsy, and laid himself down to sleep; but when he had slept but a little while he cried out, saying that the Mara was treading upon him. His men hastened to him to help him; but when they took hold of his head she trod on his legs, and when they laid hold of his legs she pressed upon his head; and it was his death. The Swedes took his body and burnt it at a river called Skytaa, where a standing stone was raised over him.

Snorri also quoted some lines from Ynglingatal composed in the 9th century:

En á vit Vilja bróður vitta véttr Vanlanda kom, þá er trollkund of troða skyldi liðs grímhildr ljóna bága; ok sá brann á beði Skútu menglötuðr, er mara kvalði.	And Vanlande, in a fatal hour, Was dragg'd by Grimhild's daughter's power, The witch-wife's, to the dwelling-place Where men meet Odin face to face. Trampled to death, to Skytaa's shore The corpse his faithful followers bore; And there they burnt, with heavy hearts, The good chief killed by witchcraft's arts.

The Historia Norwegiæ presents a Latin summary of Ynglingatal, older than Snorri's quotation:

Iste [Swegthir] genuit Wanlanda, qui in somno a dæmone suffocatus interiit, quod genus dæmoniorum norwegico sermone mara vocatur. Hic genuit Wisbur [...]

He [Sveigde] sired Vanlande, who died in his sleep, suffocated by a goblin, one of the demonic species known in Norwegian as 'mare'. He was the father of Visbur, [...]

The even earlier source Íslendingabók cites the line of descent in Ynglingatal and also gives Vanlandi as the successor of Svegðir and the predecessor of Visbur: v Svegðir. vi Vanlandi. vii Visburr. viii Dómaldr.

== Geography ==
Geographical note: According to the article Skuttunge in Nationalencyklopedin, the creek Skutá lent its name to the village of Skuttunge and the parish of Skuttunge (sv). The area contains not only raised stones but also 45 grave fields, most dating from the Iron Age, including a dolmen. The creek is now named after the village.

The area has undergone significant post-glacial rebound, rising approximately 0.5 meters every 100 years. This process has greatly altered the position of the coastline, lakes, rivers, and human settlements over time.

== Sources ==
- Ynglingatal
- Ynglinga saga (part of the Heimskringla)
- Historia Norwegiae

Vanlandi House of Yngling
Preceded by Sveigðir	Mythological king of Sweden	Succeeded by Visbur
