= Vanaheimr =

Home of the Vanir

In Norse cosmology, Vanaheimr (Old Norse for 'home of the Vanir') is a location associated with the Vanir, a group of gods themselves associated with fertility, wisdom, and the ability to see the future.

Vanaheimr is attested in the Poetic Edda; compiled in the 13th century from earlier traditional sources, and the Prose Edda and (in euhemerized form) Heimskringla; both written in the 13th century by Snorri Sturluson. In the Poetic Edda and the Prose Edda, Vanaheimr is described as the location where the god Njörðr was raised.

== Attestations ==
Vanaheimr is mentioned a single time in the Poetic Edda; in a stanza of the poem Vafþrúðnismál. In Vafþrúðnismál, Gagnráðr (the god Odin in disguise) engages in a game of wits with the jötunn Vafþrúðnir. Gagnráðr asks Vafþrúðnir whence the Van god Njörðr came, for, though he rules over many hofs and hörgrs, Njörðr was not raised among the Æsir. Vafþrúðnir responds that Njörðr was created in Vanaheimr by "wise powers" and references that Njörðr was exchanged as a hostage during the Æsir-Vanir War. In addition, Vafþrúðnir comments that, when the world ends (Ragnarök), Njörðr will return to the "wise Vanir" (Bellows here anglicizes Vanir to Wanes):

Benjamin Thorpe translation: In Vanaheim wise powers him created, and to the gods a hostage gave. At the world's dissolution, he will return to the wise Vanir.	Henry Adams Bellows translation: In the home of the Wanes did the wise ones create him, And gave him as a pledge to the gods; At the fall of the world shall he far once more Home to the Wanes so wise.

In chapter 23 of the Prose Edda book Gylfaginning, the enthroned figure of High says that Njörðr was raised in Vanaheimr, but was later sent as a hostage to the Æsir.

The Heimskringla book Ynglinga saga records an euhemerized account of the origins of Norse mythology. In chapter 1, "Van Home or the Home of the Vanir" is described as located around the Don River (which Snorri writes was once called "Tana Fork" or "Vana Fork"). Chapter 4 describes the Æsir-Vanir War, noting that during a hostage exchange, the Æsir sent the god Hœnir to Vanaheim and there he was immediately made chieftain. In chapter 15, the king Sveigðir is recorded as having married a woman named Vana in "Vanaland", located in Sweden. The two produced a child, who they named Vanlandi (meaning "Man from the Land of the Vanir").

== Theories ==
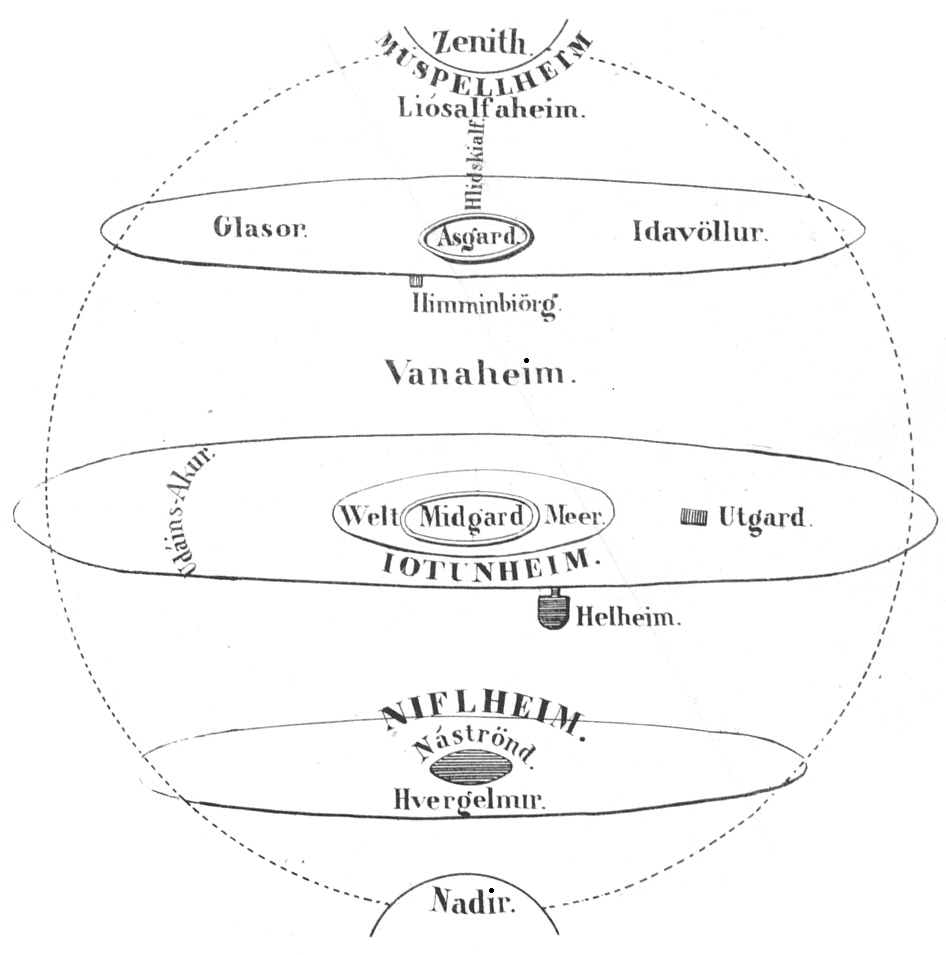
An attempt to illustrate Norse cosmology by Henry Wheaton (1831)

The existence of Nine Worlds receive mention in some Old Norse texts. These worlds are nowhere specifically listed in sequence, but are generally assumed to include Vanaheimr. Henry Adams Bellows considers the other eight to be Asgard, Álfheimr, Midgard, Jötunheimr, Svartálfaheimr, Niflheim, Múspellsheimr and Helheim.

Hilda Ellis Davidson comments that exactly where Vanaheimr fall among the Nine Worlds isn't clear, since "the chief gods Freyr and Njord with a number of others, are represented along with the Æsir in Asgard, but it seems probable that it was in the underworld." Davidson notes a connection between the Vanir and "the land-spirits who dwelt in mounds and hills and in water [...].

Rudolf Simek claims that Snorri "unquestionably" invented the name Vanaheimr as a Vanir counterpart to Asgard, but does not mention the Vafþrúðnismál reference.
