= Ynglinga saga =

Literary work

Ynglinga Saga
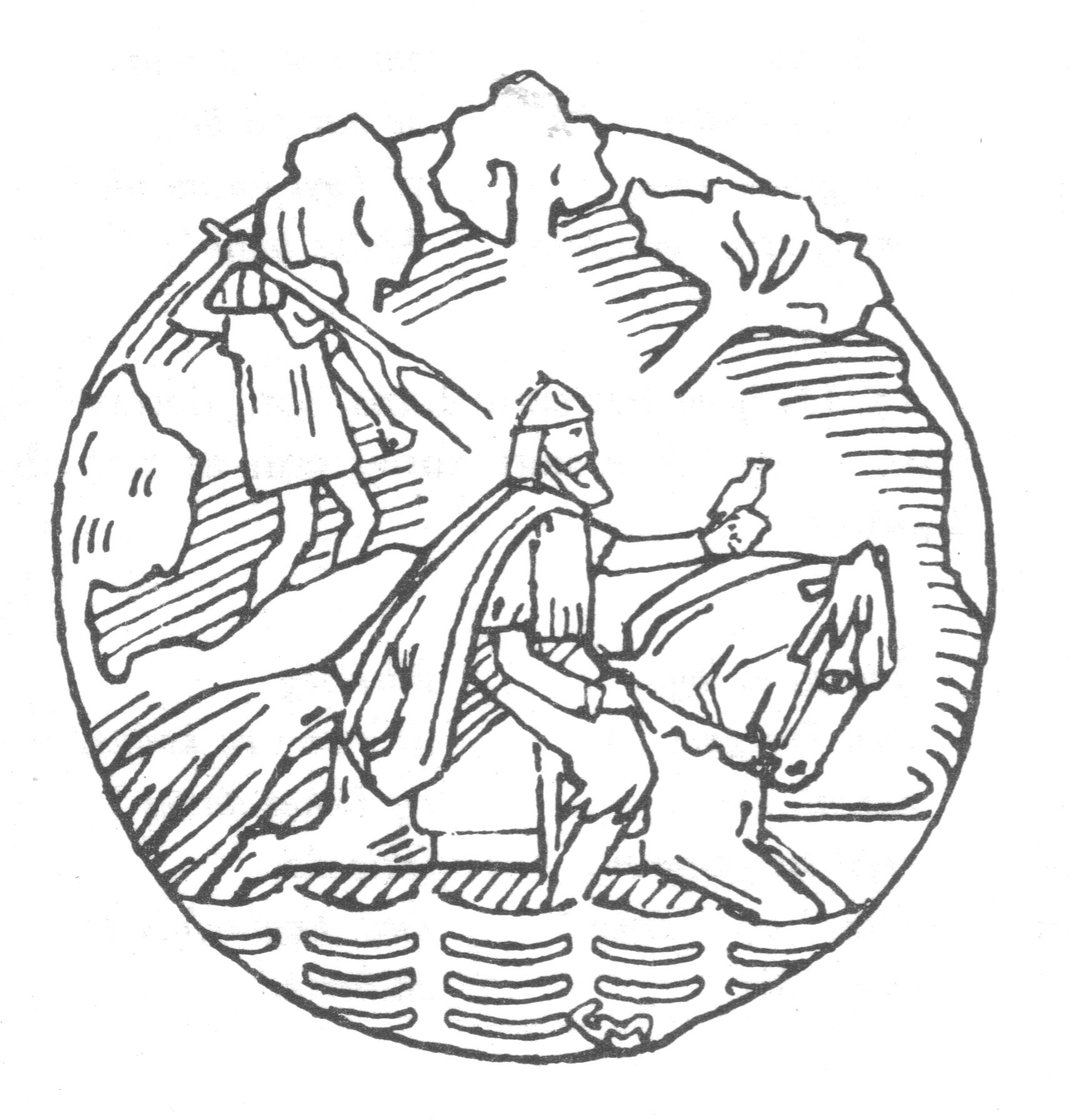
- An illustration by Gerhard Munthe for Ynglinga saga
- Full title: Ynglinga Saga or The Story of the Yngling Family from Odin to Halfdan the Black
- Author(s): Snorri Sturluson
- Language: Old Norse
- Date: about 1225
- Series: Heimskringla
- Genre: Chronicle
- Period covered: until 1177
- Text: Ynglinga Saga at Wikisource

Ynglinga saga (modern Icelandic pronunciation: [ˈiŋliŋka ˈsaːɣa]) is a Kings' saga, originally written in Old Norse by the Icelandic poet and historian Snorri Sturluson in about 1225, is the first section of his Heimskringla. It was first translated into English and published in 1844 by Samuel Laing.

Snorri Sturluson based his work on an earlier Ynglingatal which is attributed to the Norwegian 9th-century skald Þjóðólfr of Hvinir, and which also appears in Historia Norwegiae. It tells the most ancient part of the story of the House of Ynglings (Scylfings in Beowulf). Snorri described the descent of the kings of Norway from this royal house of Sweden.

Ynglinga saga is the first part of Snorri's history of the ancient Norse kings, the Heimskringla. Interwoven in this narrative are references to important historical events.

The saga deals with the arrival of the Norse gods to Scandinavia and how Freyr founded the Swedish Yngling dynasty at Uppsala. Then the saga follows the line of Swedish kings until Ingjald (Ingjald illråde), after which the descendants settled in Norway and became the ancestors of the Norwegian King Harald Fairhair.

== Synopsis ==
Hrólf Kraki Tradition

Hrólf Kraki's saga
Ynglinga saga
Lejre Chronicle
Gesta Danorum
Beowulf
People
Hrólfr Kraki
Halfdan
Helgi
Yrsa
Adils
Áli
Bödvar Bjarki
Hjörvard
Roar
Locations
Lejre
Uppsala
Fyrisvellir

=== Swithiod the Great ===
The saga begins with a description of the "earth's circle" inhabited by the human race and divided by great seas running into the land from the "out-ocean". The Black Sea divides the earth into three parts: Asia in the east, Europe in the west and "Swithiod the Great, or the Cold" in the north. The saga distinguishes between Swithiod the Great (literally "Sweden the Great"), where the opening scenes are set, and Sweden proper, in Scandinavia, where the reign of the Ynglings begins. These lands differ in a metaphorical sense as well, since the former is also called Godheim or the home of gods, while the latter is called Mannheim or the place where people live.

Swithiod the Great is a vast territory populated by many "races of men", and divided from other lands by a large mountain ridge going from northeast to southwest. This mountain ridge (probably referring to the Ural Mountains) lies "outside of all inhabited lands" but its southern part is not far from "Turkland" (probably Khazaria). On the southern side of the mountains runs the river Tanais, formerly known as Tanaquisl or Vanaquisl (the modern day Don), which flows into the Black Sea and marks the border between Europe and Asia.

=== Vanaland and Asaland ===
People on the Tanais live in a country called Vanaland or Vanaheim. East of the river, in Asia, stretches a country called Asaland or Asaheim. The main city of Asaland is Asgaard, where Odin is a chief. Twelve temple priests, called Diar, direct sacrifices in Asgaard and also judge the people, who serve and obey them. Odin is a great warrior, who conquers many kingdoms in all parts of the world, never losing a battle. His men are used to receive his blessing before going into battle, and to call upon his name when fighting, in order to inspire themselves.

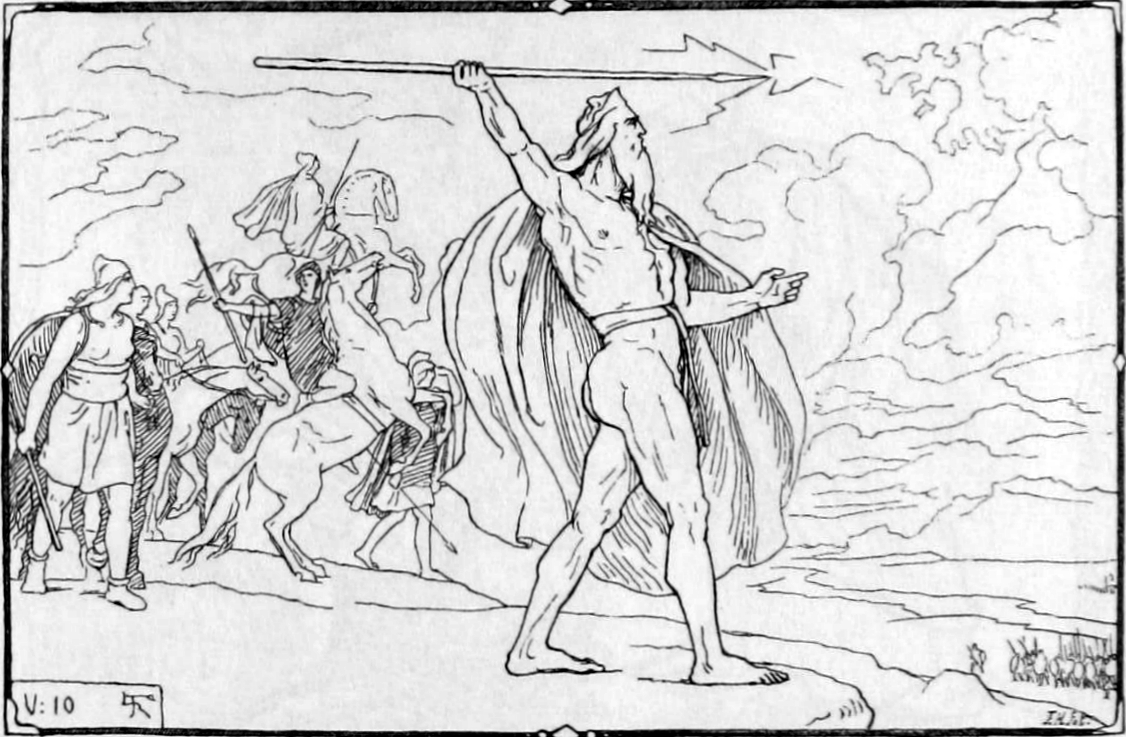
Æsir-Vanir war by Lorenz Frølich

Odin wages war against Vanaland people, but cannot win over them. After doing great damage to each other, both sides agree to a truce and exchange hostages. Thus the best people of Vanaland are sent to Asaland as hostages: Njord the Rich, with his son Frey and daughter Freya as well as the wisest man in Vanaland called Kvase. The people of Asaland, in their turn, send a wise man called Mime along with a stout handsome man called Hone, who is allegedly very suitable to become a chief, to Vanaland. Hone is immediately made a chief in Vanaland, but people there realize how bad he actually is at taking decisions when not advised by Mime. They decapitate Mime and send his head to Asaland, where Odin smears it with herbs and sings incantations over it giving it the power to speak and reveal many secrets to Odin.

=== Arrival of Odin in Scandinavia ===
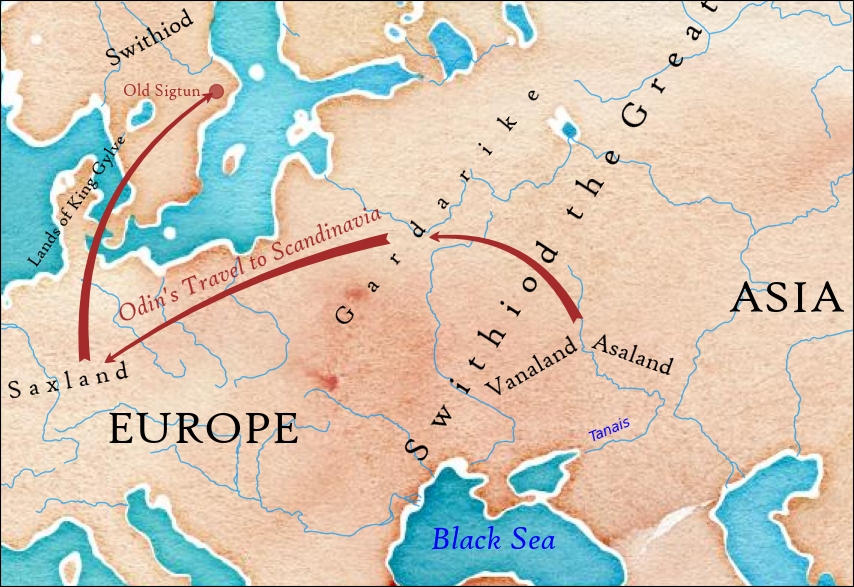
A possible path of Odin's travel to Scandinavia, according to the Ynglinga Saga

Odin has a foresight about the new dwelling place in the north and goes there "with all the gods and a great many other people", leaving his two brothers, Vilje and Ve, to rule in Asgaard. First, Odin and his companions wander westwards to Gardarike and from there - south to Saxland, where Odin's sons start to rule. Odin goes towards the sea in the north, settles in an island called Odinsö in Fyen and sends Gefion to discover new lands to the north, in Scandinavia. When she reaches the possessions of king Gylve, he grants her a plowable field. After having four sons with a giant in Jotunheim, Gefion turns them into a yoke of oxen and makes them plow the field breaking out a piece of land into the ocean close to Odinsö. This land is called Sealand, where Gefion dwells and marries Skjold, an Odin's son.

When Odin hears of how prosperous the lands to the east of Gylve's possessions are, he goes there. Despite the opposition of Gylve, Asaland people take the upper hand, make piece with him and remain on those lands. Odin settles at the Maelare lake, in the Old Sigtun, builds a temple there and sets his men to rule in the neighboring places around.

=== Odin's personality ===
Odin is described as a great sorcerer in the saga. He can shape-shift, speaks only in verse, and lies so well that everything he says seems true. He strikes enemies blind and deaf and when his own men fight they go berserk and cannot be harmed.

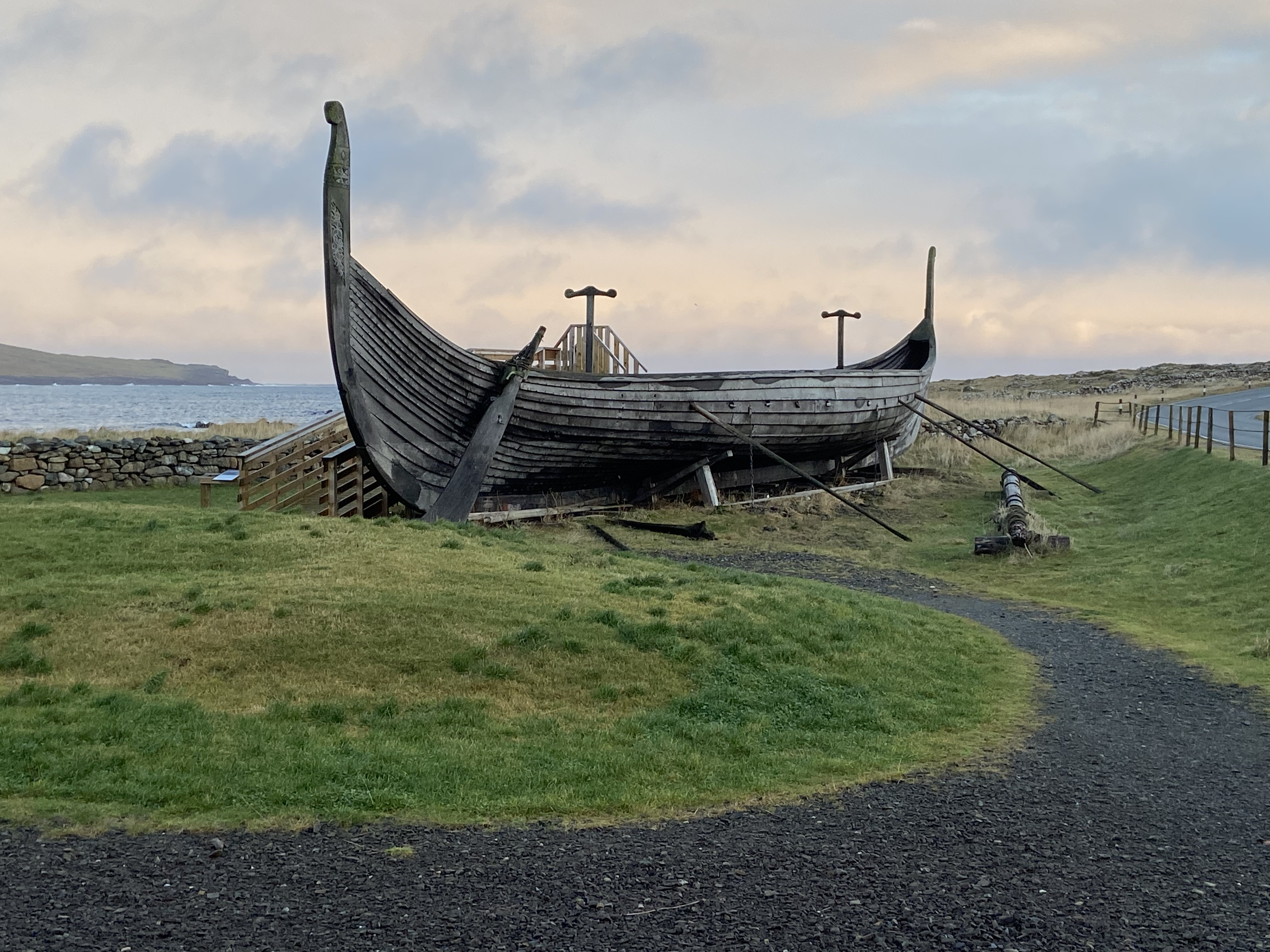
Replica of the Viking ship Skidbladnir at Haroldswick

Odin has a ship named Skidbladnir, which can be folded together like a cloth. He relies on two talking ravens to gather intelligence, and he keeps Mime's head with him, which tells him the news from other worlds. Odin teaches magic, runes and incantations. He can even awaken the dead from the earth and cause death or disease to anyone. People worship Odin and the other twelve chiefs from Asaland as their gods.

=== Death of Odin ===
Odin establishes the laws that have been previously observed in Asaland: dead men should be burned with their belongings, a mound should be raised to memorialize distinguished men, sacrifices should be held on special days in winter and in summer. Short before his death, Odin says he is going to Godheim (the other name of "Swithiod the Great" in the saga). He dies in his bed in Swithiod and is burned with honor. Snorri says: "The Swedes believed that he was gone to the ancient Asgaard, and would live there eternally".

=== Frey ===
Njord starts to rule over the Swedes after Odin. During this time, marked by peace and prosperity, all the gods die. When Njord also dies, Frey takes the power and makes Upsal his capital. Frey has also another name, Yngvi, which begins to be used as an honorific title by his descendants. Thus they are called Ynglinger. When Frey dies of illness, his men keep it secret and place his body into a great mound with three windows. People think Frey is still alive and continue to pay tribute to him, putting gold through one window, silver through another and copper coins through the third one. The Swedes eventually discover the truth but do not burn Frey's body, since they believe that peaceful times continue thanks to his presence in Sweden. They treat him as a god and sacrifice to him.

=== Yngling dynasty ===
==== Fjolne ====
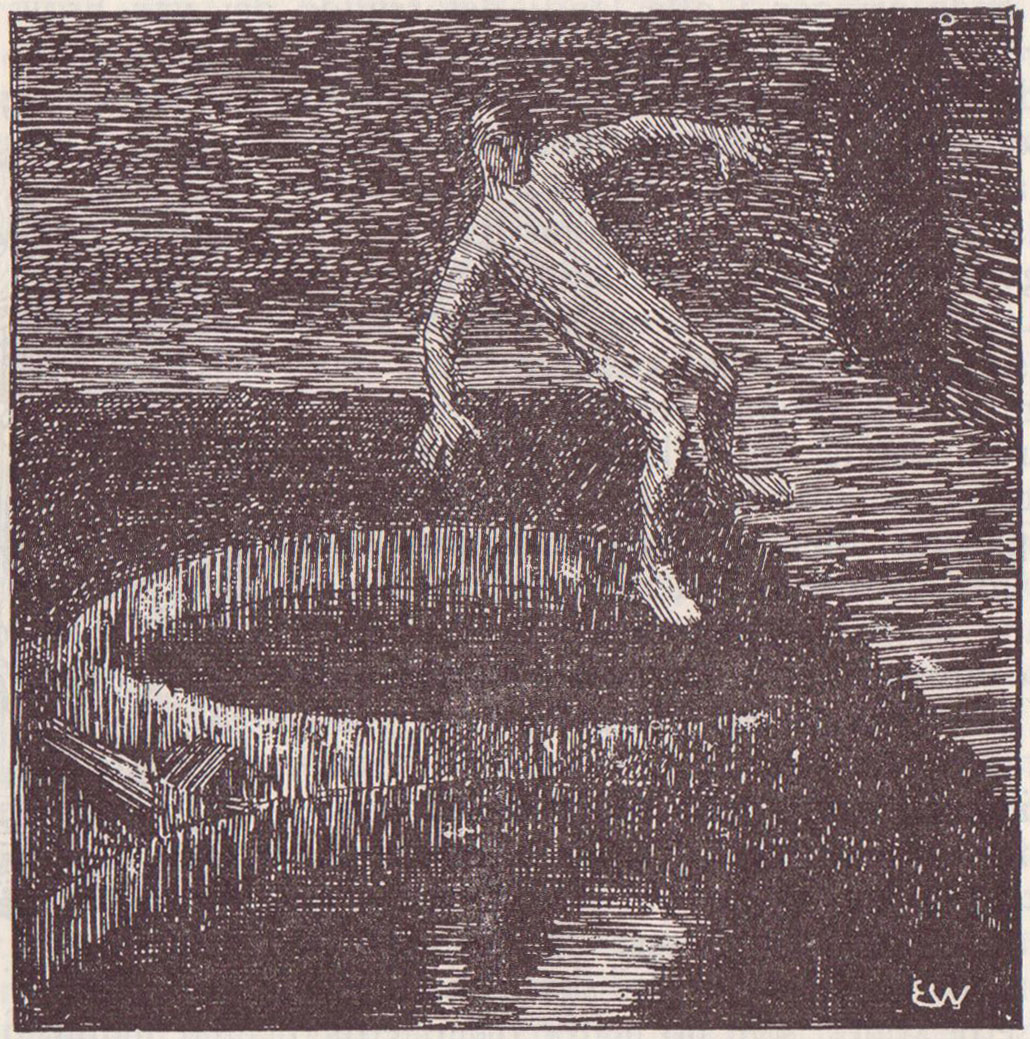
Fjolne's death by Erik Werenskiold

Frey's son Fjolne inherits the power and peacefully rules over the Swedes until he visits a great celebration in the house of Fredfrode, a ruler of Leidre. There Fjolne accidentally falls into a big vessel with mead and drowns himself.

==== Swegde ====
Swegde, Fjolne's son, takes the kingdom, but decides to seek Godheim and Odin, so he sets out on a 5-year travel for that. Swegde comes to Turkland and then to the Great Swithiod. He does not find Odin, but gets a wife in Vanaland called Vana, who gives birth to their son Vanlande. When Swegde returns to Sweden with his family he is still determined to seek Godheim. During his second journey Swegde meets a dwarf, who tricks him into entering a big hollow stone, where Swegde is trapped forever.

==== Vanlande ====
Vanlande becomes a king in Upsal. As a great warrior, he ventures out to many lands and gets a wife in Finland called Driva. They have a son Visbur, but then Vanlande leaves his family for a long time. Driva sends Visbur to Sweden and asks the witch Huld to either force Vanlande to return to Finland or kill him with her witchcraft. Vanlande does not return, and thus is killed in his sleep by the Mara.

==== Visbur ====
Visbur succeeds his father and marries the daughter of Aude the Rich, who gives birth to their two sons Gisle and Ond. However, Visbur leaves his family and takes another wife, with whom he has a son Domald. Gisle and Ond grow up and demand their mother's dower of Visbur, but he refuses to pay. They revenge by burning Visbur in his own house, assisted by the Huld's sorcery.

==== Domald ====
After his fathers's death, Domald becomes a king. His rule is marked by great famine and distress, and Swedes make many offerings of sacrifice in a hope to end the times of scarcity. First they sacrifice fruits and animals. Then they move on to the humans. When they see that nothing helps they sacrifice Domald himself to the gods.

==== Domar and his son Dygve ====
Then the Domald's son, called Domar, reigns peacefully over the Swedes for a long time. When he dies in Upsal his body is moved to Fyrisvold and burned on the river bank. The power is taken by his son Dygve of whom "nothing is said", according to the saga, except for that he dies then "in his bed".

==== Dag ====
King Dygve is succeeded by his son Dag, who is so wise that he can understand the language of birds. To get news he uses a sparrow, which is killed with a stone one day, in a farm called Varva, in Reidgotaland. Infuriated Dag plunders Varva out of revenge and kills many people there. On his way back Dag crosses a river at a place called Skjotan's Ford, where a slave worker throws a hayfork at the Dag's troop, killing the king instantly.

==== Agne ====
The kingdom is taken by the Dag's son Agne, a powerful warrior, who leads his army to Finland to subdue the land. After killing a Finnish chief Froste together with many of his men in a great battle, Agne marauds Finland and brings Froste's daughter Skjalv with her brother Loge to Stoksund.

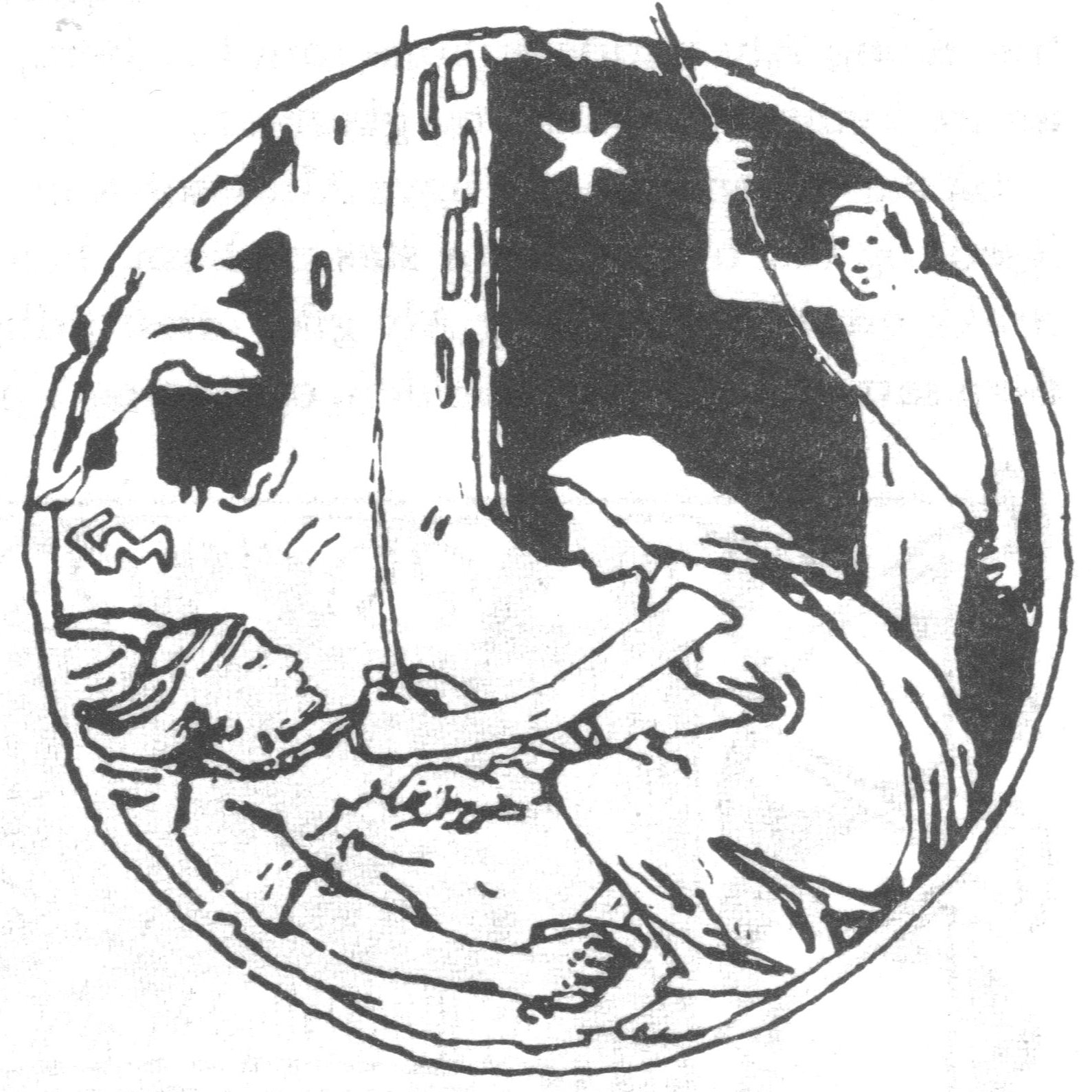
Murder of Agne, by Gerhard Munthe

There he marries Skjalv, who begs him to make a funeral feast to commemorate her father. Agne gets very drunk during the feast and falls asleep in a tent under a high tree, while wearing a golden ornament around his neck - the legacy of king Visbur. Froste's daughter fastens a noose under the ornament and lets her men hang Agne on a branch of that tree. Skjalv sails away after murdering her husband and Agne is buried at that place, which is called Agnefet afterwards.

==== Brothers Alric and Eric ====
Agne is succeeded by his sons Alric and Eric, who both become kings at the same time. Outstanding horsemen, they like to compete over who rides better. While riding out far away onto distant fields, the brothers seemingly crush each other's heads with a headgear and die.

==== Brothers Yngve and Alf ====
Alric's sons Yngve and Alf become kings of Sweden afterwards. Yngve, a renowned warrior, is handsome, cheerful and admired by everyone. In contrast to his brother, Alf is shy, unfriendly and never takes part in military expeditions. Alf's wife Bera is attracted to Yngve and spends much time in his company, which makes Alf very jealous. Alf strikes his brother with a sword, before Bera's eyes, but the dying Yngve manages to lethally wound Alf too. Both brothers fall dead and are buried in Fyrisvold.

==== Hugleik ====
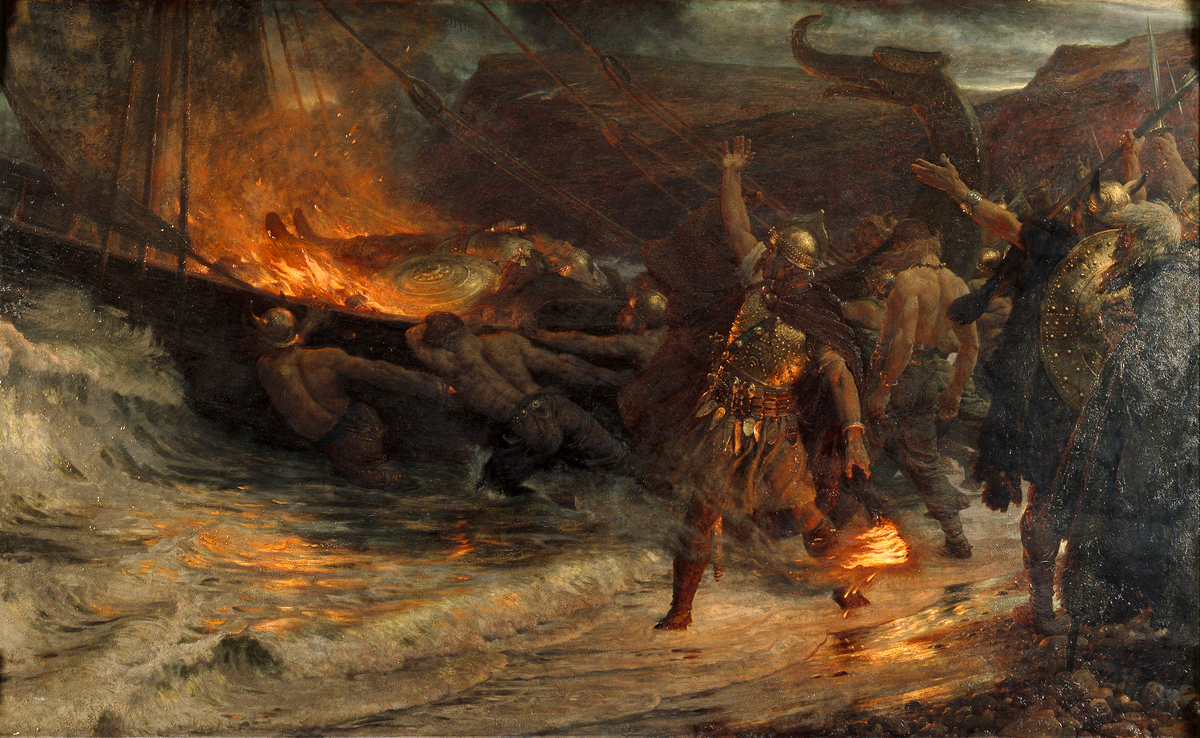
The Funeral of a Viking, by Frank Bernard Dicksee

Alf's son Hugleik inherits the power and quietly rules in the kingdom of the Swedes, until a powerful sea-king Hake comes with many warriors to attack the country. King Hugleik gathers a great army to oppose him, but loses a battle at Fyrisvold. Hake kills Hugleik together with two of his sons in the battle and becomes king of Sweden. Hake remains in Sweden while his troops are going abroad on viking expeditions. Meanwhile the sons of Yngve, Jorund and Eric, are cruising in their warships, marauding Denmark. They capture Gudlog, a king from Halogaland, bring him to Stromones and hang him there, which makes them very famous and celebrated. After hearing that king Hake's troops are abroad, Jorund and Eric gather a strong force to advance towards Upsal against Hake, who meets them at Fyrisvold and a great battle takes place there. In spite of having a smaller army, Hake fights bravely and kills Eric, forcing Jorund with his men flee to their ships. However, king Hake himself is mortally wounded in the battle and knows that his days are numbered. He orders a warship to be loaded with bodies of his warriors together with their weapons, and to be taken out to the sea. A pyre is made on the ship, where Hake is burned while not being quite dead.

==== Jorund ====
Jorund remains in Upsal and rules over the country. He leads his army to Denmark, plundering Jutland and Lymfjord, but in Oddesund he stumbles on Gylog, a son of the late king Gudlog, with a great force. Gylog, assisted by multitudes of local people, wins over Jorund in a battle, captures him and orders him to be hanged on a gallows. Thus Gylog revenges his father's death on Jorund.

==== On ====
Jorund's son On, a wise and quiet man, becomes a king of the Swedes and rules peacefully in Upsal until Halfdan, a son of the Danish king Frode Mikellati, comes to Sweden with his army. On flees to Gotland, yielding the kingdom to Halfdan, who remains there as a new king for 25 years.

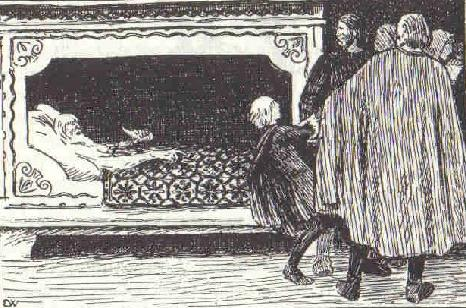
Edwin the Old by Erik Werenskiold

When Halfdan dies, On returns to Upsal while being already 60 years old and sacrifices his own son to Odin, who tells him that he will live 60 years more. King On rules in Upsal for 25 years until Ole the Bold, a Halfdan's nephew, attacks the kingdom. On flees to Gotland for the second time, losing the throne to Ole, who reigns over Sweden for 25 years. When Ole is killed by Starkad the Old, On comes back to Upsal and rules over the kingdom for another 25 years. Then he sacrifices his second son to Odin, who promises that On's life will last as long as he gives one of his sons to Odin every tenth year. On keeps living and sacrificing his sons until only one of them remains, whom he also wants to give to Odin, but Swedes do not let it happen. Therefore On finally dies at an extremely old age.

==== Egil ====
Tunne, an On's slave working as his counselor and treasurer, hides much of the On's treasures in the earth. As soon as Egil, the only remaining son of On, inherits the throne he reduces Tunne to the rank of an ordinary slave. The deeply offended Tunne runs away with some other slaves, digs up the On's treasures, shares it among his men and becomes their chief. Joined by gangs of local robbers they plunder the country and kill many people, compelling Egil to lead his army against the mutinous slave. However, Tunne suddenly attacks Egil's field camp at night, forcing the king's men to flee to the forest and causing even more damage to the country. Egil assembles an army again, but suffers a heavy defeat from the forces of Tunne. After losing a series of battles to Tunne, the king flees the country and comes to Sealand in Denmark, promising to pay scatt to Frode the Bold in return for his help. Frode gives his army with some of the best warriors to Egil. King Egil, assisted by Danes, defeats Tunne and rules three years over Sweden, sending King Frode great presents every year in acknowledgement of his help, but does not pay scatt to the Danes. Egil dies of a mortal wound inflicted by a runaway bull and is buried in a mound at Upsal.

==== Ottar ====
Egil's son Ottar succeeds to the kingdom after his father but does not continue to keep up a friendship with King Frode. Frode's messengers come to demand the scatt promised by Egil, which Ottar refuses to pay. As a punishment, the Sweden is ravaged by the Danes who kill many people and take captives there. In revenge, King Ottar sails to Denmark with his warriors when Frode is away on an expedition, and desolates the country. When Ottar is plundering the Vend district of Lymfjord, Danish earls Vatt and Faste bring their army there to fight off the Swedes. As a result of a great battle, Ottar is defeated and killed, and the Danes leave his body on a mound for wild beasts and ravens to tear at it.

The remaining chapters of the saga describe the rule of Yngling dynasty down to the Rognvald the Mountain-High.

== General references ==
- Krag, Claus (1991). Ynglingatal og Ynglingesaga- en studie i historiske kilder (in Norwegian).
- Nerman, Birger (1925). Det svenska rikets uppkomst (in Swedish). Stockholm.
- Bruno Sjöros (1912), Till tolkningen av Ynglingasagans visor / Bruno Sjöros., Skrifter utgivna av Svenska litteratursällskapet i Finland (in Swedish), Helsinki: Society of Swedish Literature in Finland, ISSN 0039-6842, Wikidata Q113396195
- Åkerlund, W. (1939). Studier över Ynglingatal (in Swedish). Lund.
