= Helmut Birkhan =

Austrian philologist

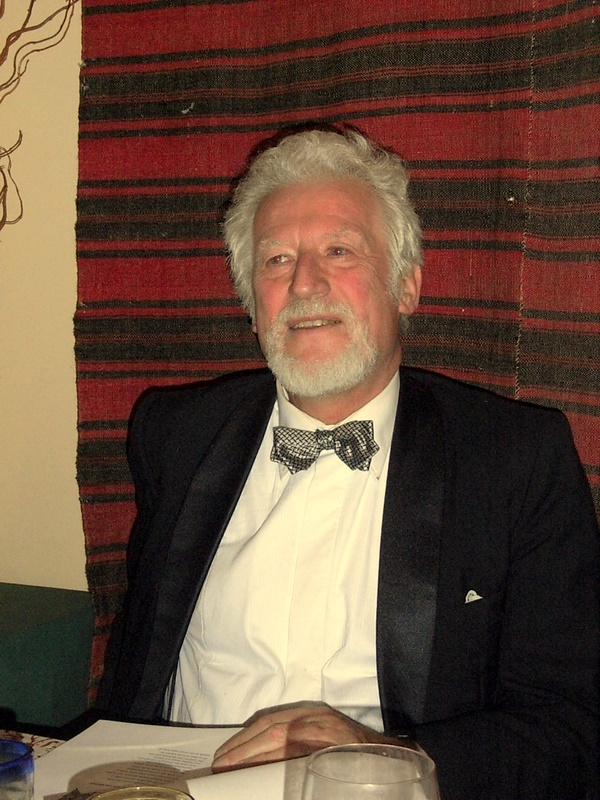
- Photograph of Helmut Birkhan reciting his Middle High German translation of Struwwelpeter at his home in Vienna on the celebration of his 70th birthday
- Born: 1 February 1938 (age 88); Vienna, Austria
- Spouse: Ingvild Birkhan (after 1965)
- Children: 2
- Awards: Officer of the Order of Orange-Nassau (1990)

Academic background
- Education: University of Vienna
- Academic advisors: Otto Höfler; Proinsias Mac Cana; Heinrich Beck

Academic work
- Discipline: Philology
- Sub-discipline: Celtic studies; Germanic studies; Indo-European studies; Scandinavian studies
- Institutions: University of Vienna
- Notable students: Hermann Reichert; Rudolf Simek; Florian Kragl; Fritz Peter Knapp; Alfred Ebenbauer
- Main interests: Medieval German literature; Celts; Germanic linguistics

Helmut Birkhan (born 1 February 1938) is an Austrian philologist who is Professor Emeritus of Old High German Language and Literature and the former managing director of the Institute for Germanic Studies at the University of Vienna.

Having studied at Vienna under Otto Höfler, Birkhan specializes in Celtic, Germanic, and Indo-European studies, particularly the study of Celtic-Germanic contacts, Germanic linguistics and Medieval German literature from an interdisciplinary perspective, on which he has published numerous influential works. He has taught generations of students at Vienna, as is well known as a popularizer of scholarship for the broader Austrian public, particularly young people. Birkhan has tutored many influential scholars, including Hermann Reichert, Rudolf Simek, Florian Kragl, Melitta Adamson, Fritz Peter Knapp and Alfred Ebenbauer, and continues to teach, write and research.

== Early life and education ==
Helmut Birkhan was born in Vienna, Austria on 1 February 1938, the son of Josef Birkhan, a civil engineer, and Maria Müller. After graduating from gymnasium in Vienna, Birkhan studied philosophy, psychology, classical philology and Germanistics at the University of Vienna, and eventually specialized in Germanicstics, particularly Ancient Germanistics. Birkhan received his PhD in 1962 under the supervision of Otto Höfler, with the dissertation Die Verwandlung in der Volkserzählung. Along with Otto Gschwantler, Peter Wiesinger and Erika Kartschoke and other future prominent scholars, Birkhan belonged to a circle of Höfler's favourite students who called themselves the Drachenrunde. Höfler, who is named in Max Weinreich's Hitler's Professors, and Höfler's questionable stances to Nazi ideology, may have had undue influence on the field in post-war Austria. The Drachenrunde teacher's degree of influence on young Germanistik research after WWII, a sensitive topic, has however, been discussed.

Birkhan lectured at the University of Wales from 1961 to 1962. At Wales, his teacher was the prominent Celtologist Proinsias Mac Cana. Since 1963 he lectured at the Institute for Germanic Studies at the University of Vienna as an assistant of Höfler. In Birkhan, Höfler saw the same capabilities for interdisciplinary learning which was characteristic of his own teacher, the famed Rudolf Much. In 1968 Birkhan received the prestigious two-year Humboldt Research Fellowship to pursue further studies at the University of Göttingen, and subsequently studied archaeology with Herbert Jankuhn, Indo-European studies with Oswald Szemerényi, Celtic studies with Josef Weisweiler, and Scandinavistics with Heinrich Beck. In January 1970, Birkhan habilitated in Ancient Germanistics with a thesis on the relationship between Celts and Germanic peoples in classical antiquity.

== Career ==
Birkhan was appointed Professor of Ancient German Language and Literature at the University of Vienna in 1972. He was subsequently appointed managing director of the Institute for Germanic Studies at the University of Vienna. In 1988, Birkhan established Niederlandistik as a distinct course at Vienna, and subsequently secured the appointment of Herbert van Uffelen to teach this subject. In 1997, Birkhan completed an additional habilitation in Celtic studies with the thesis Kelten. Versuch einer Gesamtdarstellung ihrer Kultur. Together with David Stifter, he subsequently established Celtology as a distinct course at Vienna. After Birkhan's retirement, the teaching of Celtology was suspended at Vienna, despite great opposition from students.

For almost half a century, Birkhan has taught generations of students at Vienna, where he has become well known for his breath of knowledge and friendly personality. He has also dedicated himself towards making scholarship available to the broader public, notably appearing as a druid on the children's television program on the Österreichischer Rundfunk. Many scholars of prominence have gained their degrees under the supervision of Birkhan, including Hermann Reichert, Rudolf Simek, Manfred Kern, Florian Kragl, Melitta Adamson, Sang Bea Pack, Fritz Peter Knapp and Alfred Ebenbauer.

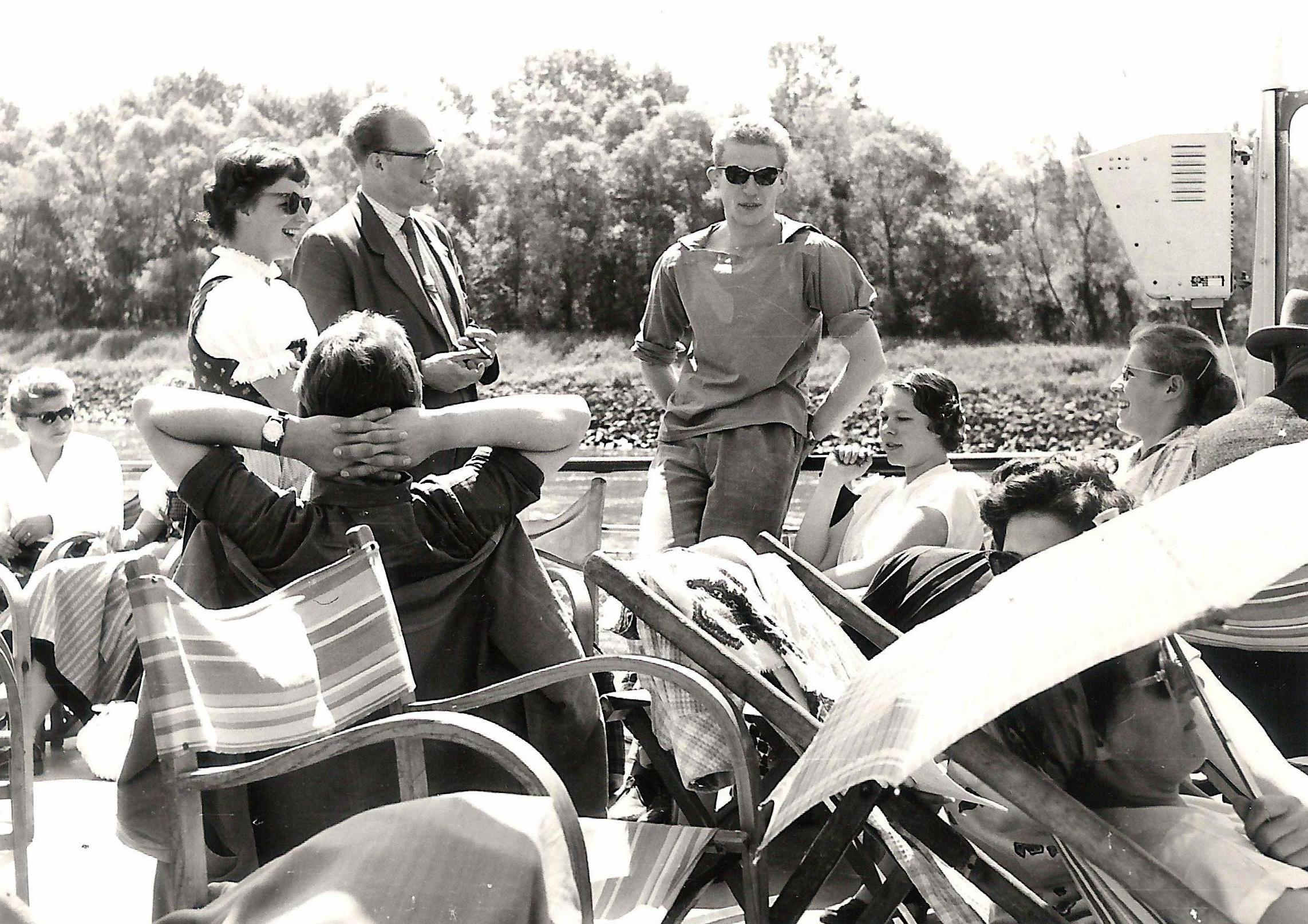
Helmut Birkhan (in sunglasses) with Peter Wiesinger (on Birkhan's right) and other friends from the University of Vienna during an excursion to the Danube in 1960. The circle of friends pictured were students of Otto Höfler, and affectionately called themselves the Drachenrunde.

Birkhan has been a visiting professor at several universities, including the universities of Picardy Jules Verne (1980), Amsterdam (1993–1994) and Antwerp (1994–1995). Birkhan has received many awards for his scholarship, and was in 1990 made an Officer of the Order of Orange-Nassau (1990). He his a member of several distinguished learned societies, including the Maatschappij der Nederlandse Letterkunde (1991), Austrian Academy of Sciences (1994), the Norwegian Academy of Science and Letters (2002) and the Heidelberg Academy of Sciences and Humanities (2005). He has had two festschrift's published in his honor, Ir Sult Sprechen Willekomen (1998), which was edited by Christa Agnes Tuczay, and Kulturphilologie. (2015), which was edited by his former students Manfred Kern and Florian Kragl.

Birkhan retired from the University of Vienna as professor emeritus in October 2006, but continues to teach and research there, and has continued to publish.

== Research ==
Birkhans research centers on Old High and Middle High German literature, Germanic linguistics, Indo-European linguistics, Celtic studies and Arthurian literature. He also researches archaeology, religious history, fairy tales, alchemy and psychoanalysis. Birkhan cultivates interdisciplinary research, and has cooperated extensively with historians, philosophers and other scholars. He sees Celtic and Germanic studies as primarily a study of culture.

Birkhan is also known for his translations of works from various languages, including Middle Welsh and Middle High German works. Birkhan is the author of hundreds of scholarly books and articles in German, English and other languages. He is also the works of numerous works intended for popular audiences, some of them of humorous nature. Many of Birkhan's research projects have been carried out at the Austrian Academy of Sciences, such as the Lexikon der altgermanischen Namen (supervised together with Hermann Reichert and Robert Nedoma), and Motif-Index of German Secular Narratives from the Beginning to 1400 (together with Christa Tuczay and others), which was published in seven volumes.

== Awards ==
- 1990: Officer of the Order of Orange-Nassau
- 1992: Wilhelm-Hartel-Preis
- 2000: Kardinal-Innitzer-Preis
- 2006: Silbernes Komturkreuz für Verdienste um das Land Niederösterreich

== Festschrifts ==
- Ir sult sprechen willekomen. Grenzenlose Mediävistik. Fs. f. H. Birkhan zum 60. Geburtstag, hg. Christa Tuczay, Ulrike Hirhager, Karin Lichtblau, Peter Lang Bern – Berlin – Frankfurt a.M. ...1998, ISBN 3-906759-24-5 863S
- Kulturphilologie. Vorträge des Festcolloquiums zum 75. Geburtstag von Helmut Birkhan, hg. Manfred Kern - Florian Kragl (= Philologica germanica 37), Fassbaender Wien 2015, ISBN 978-3-902575-69-2

== Memberships ==
- 1991: Maatschappij der Nederlandse Letterkunde
- 1994: Austrian Academy of Sciences
- 2002: Norwegian Academy of Science and Letters
- 2005: Heidelberg Academy of Sciences and Humanities

== Personal life ==
Birkhan married Ingvild Birkhan (née Bach), a prominent philologist and philosopher, in 1965. Helmut and Ingvild have two daughters, Barbara Rhiannon Xochitl and Ines Birkhan (born Ines Obilot Papalotl). Ines is a distinguished author, dancer and choreographer. Their daughters were given Nahuatl names, as Helmut and Ingvild have a great interest for the Aztecs. Birkhan's hobbies include botany, photography, music (including classical music, jazz and folk music), cooking, dancing, mountain sports, skiing and sailing.

== See also ==
- Rudolf Much
- Hector Munro Chadwick
- Jan de Vries (philologist)
- Georges Dumézil
- Dennis Howard Green
- Raimund Karl

== Selected works ==
- Germanen und Kelten bis zum Ausgang der Römerzeit. Der Aussagewert von Wörtern und Sachen für die frühesten keltisch-germanischen Kulturbeziehungen (= Sitzungsberichte d. Österr. Akad. d. Wiss., phil.-hist. Kl. 272), Wien 1970, 638 S.
- Reimar, Walther und die Minne. Zur ersten Dichterfehde am Wiener Hof, in: PBB (Tübingen) 93 (1971), 168 - 212.
- Zur Datierung, Deutung und Gliederung einiger Lieder Neidharts von Reuental (= Sitzungsberichte d. Österr. Akad. d. Wiss., phil.-hist. Kl. 273, 1. Abh.), Wien 1971, 64 S.
- Das Historische im 'Ring' des Heinrich Wittenweiler (= Sitzungsberichte d. Österr. Akad. d. Wiss., phil.-hist. Kl. 287), Wien 1973, 67 S.
- Das "Zipfsche Gesetz", das schwache Präteritum und die germanische Lautverschiebung (= Sitzungsberichte d. Österr. Akad. d. Wiss., phil.-hist. Kl.348), Wien 1979, 106 S.
- Jean Renart. Der Roman von der Rose oder Wilhelm von Dole. Eine Erzählung von Liebe und Intrige aus dem frühen 13. Jahrhundert'. Mit einer Einleitung aus dem Altfranzösischen übersetzt v. Helmut Birkhan (= Fabulae mediaevales 1), Wien 1982, 243 S.
- Neidhart von Reuental und Sigmund Freud. Allgemeines und Spezielles zur psy-choanalytischen Interpretation mittelalterlicher Texte, in: Neidhart von Reuental. Aspekte einer Neubewertung, hg. Helmut Birkhan (= Philologica Germanica Bd. 5), Wien 1983, 34 - 73.
- Heinrich Wittenwiler, Der Ring. Übers. u. hg. v. Helmut Birkhan, nach d. Ausgabe Edmund Wießners (= Fabulae Mediaevales 3), Wien 1983. 311 S.
- Etymologie des Deutschen (= Langs Germanistische Lehrbuchsammlung, Bd. 15), Bern – Frankfurt am Main – New York 1985, 343 S.
- Keltische Erzählungen vom Kaiser Arthur I, II. Aus dem Mittelkymrischen übertragen, mit Einführungen, Erläuterungen und Anmerkungen (= Erzählungen des Mittelalters Bd. 1, Teil I und II), 2 Bde., Essen 1989. 271 + 271 S.; 2. korrigierte und aktualisierte Auflage Wien 2004.
- Daniel von dem Blühenden Tal. Ein höfischer Unterhaltungsroman von dem Stricker (= Erzählungen des Mittelalters 4), Essen 1991, 248 S. + Farbtafeln
- Die Juden in der deutschen Literatur des Mittelalters, in: Die Juden in ihrer mittelalterlichen Umwelt. Protokolle einer Ring-Vorlesung gehalten im Sommerse-mester 1989, hg. Helmut Birkhan (= WAGAPh 33), Bern 1992, 143 - 178.
- Die alchemistische Lehrdichtung des Gratheus filius Philosophi in Cod. Vind. 2372. Zugleich ein Beitrag zur okkulten Wissenschaft im Spätmittelalter, 1. Bd.: Einleitung, Untersuchungen, Kommentar; 2. Bd.: Textedition, Übersetzung, Register (= Sitzungsberichte d. Österr. Akad. d. Wiss., phil.-hist. Kl. 591), Wien 1992, 494 + 342 S. + 7 S. Bildanhang
- Kelten. Versuch einer Gesamtdarstellung ihrer Kultur, Wien 1997, 1267 S.; 2. korrigierte und erweiterte Auflage: Wien 1997, 1275 S.; 3. korrigierte Auflage 1999; Übersetzung des ersten Drittels ins Russische durch Nina Chekhonadskaja als: Kelty. Istorija i Kul'tura, Moskwa Agraf 2007, 512 S.
- Kelten. Bilder ihrer Kultur (= Celts. Images of their Culture), Wien 1999, 454 S.
- Leben und Abenteuer des großen Königs Apollonius von Tyrus zu Land und zur See. Ein Abenteuerroman von Heinrich von Neustadt, verfaßt zu Wien um 1300 nach Gottes Geburt. Übertragen mit allen Miniaturen der Wiener Hs C, mit An-merkungen und einem Nachwort von Helmut Birkhan, Bern ‒ Berlin ‒ Bruxelles ‒ Frankfurt a.M. ‒ New York ‒ Oxford ‒ Wien 2001, 463 S.; Neuausgabe 2005.
- Der Traditionsraum der altdeutschen Literatur in kulturwissenschaftlicher Sicht (Plenarvortrag am IVG Kongreß Wien 2000), in: Akten des X. Internationalen Germanistenkongresses Wien 2000. "Zeitenwende ‒ Die Germanistik auf dem Weg vom 20. ins 21. Jahrhundert", hg. P. Wiesinger unter Mitarbeit von Hans Derkits, Band I: Grußworte und Eröffnungsvorträge ‒ Plenarvorträge ‒ Diskussionsforen ‒ Berichte hg. P. Wiesinger, Bern ‒ Berlin ‒ Bruxelles ‒ Frankfurt am Main ‒ New York ‒ Oxford ‒ Wien 2001, 65 - 96.
- Geschichte der altdeutschen Literatur im Licht ausgewählter Texte. Teil I: Alt-hochdeutsche und altsächsische Literatur, Wien 2002, 230 S.
- Geschichte der altdeutschen Literatur im Licht ausgewählter Texte. Teil II: Mit-telhochdeutsche vor- und frühhöfische Literatur, Wien 2002, 281 S.
- Geschichte der altdeutschen Literatur im Licht ausgewählter Texte. Teil III: Min-nesang und Sangspruchdichtung der Stauferzeit, Wien 2003, 271 S.
- "Altgermanistik" und germanistische Sprachwissenschaft, in: Cognitio humana. Geschichte der österreichischen Humanwissenschaften, hg. Karl Acham, Wien 2003, 115 - 192.
- Geschichte der altdeutschen Literatur im Licht ausgewählter Texte. Teil IV: Ro-manliteratur der Stauferzeit, Wien 2003, 277 S.
- Geschichte der altdeutschen Literatur im Licht ausgewählter Texte. Teil V: Nach-klassische Romane und höfische "Novellen", Wien 2004, 296 S.
- Geschichte der altdeutschen Literatur im Licht ausgewählter Texte. Teil VI: Hel-denepik der Staufer- und vom Anfang der Habsburgerzeit, Wien 2004, 233 S.
- Geschichte der altdeutschen Literatur im Licht ausgewählter Texte. Teil VII: Min-nesang, Sangspruchdichtung und Verserzählung der letzten Staufer¬ und ersten Habsburgerzeit, Verlag praesens Wien 2005, 339 S.
- Geschichte der altdeutschen Literatur im Licht ausgewählter Texte. Teil VIII: Lehrhafte Dichtung zwischen 1200 und 1300, Verlag praesens Wien 2005, 373 S.
- ...swer des vergêze, der tête mir leide. Walther-Gedächtniskultur in den Gästebüchern des Vogelweidhofes in Lajen, in: der achthundertjährige Pelzrock. Walther von der Vogelweide – Wolfger von Erla – Zeiselmauer, Vorträge gehalten am Walther-Symposion der Österreichischen Akademie der Wissenschaften vom 24. bis 27. September 2003 in Zeiselmauer (Niederösterreich), hg. Helmut Birkhan unter Mitwirkung von Ann Cotten, Verlag der ÖAW Wien 2005, 25 - 82.
- Preface, in: Motif-Index of German Secular Narratives, ed. Austrian Academy of Sciences. Under the direction of Helmut Birkhan, ed. by Karin Lichtblau and Christa Tuczay in collaboration with Ulrike Hirhager and Rainer Sigl, vol. 1: Matiére de Bretagne, De Gruyter Berlin - New York 2005.
- "Germanistisches Narren=Häubel". Das ist: minima ridicula tetriciana oder: Curieuse Nebenproducte der nimmermüden Feder des Wiener Philologen Doctor Helmut J. R. Birkhan, weiland Professor publicus ordinarius an der Hohen Schule zu Wien, Mitglied verschiedener Gelehrter Gesellschaften &c&c, Wien im mmvj-ten Jahre [Praesens Verlag Wien 2006], 316 S.
- Vom Schrecken der Dinge, in: Faszination des Okkulten. Diskurse zum Übersinnlichen, hg. Wolfgang Müller-Funk – Christa Agnes Tuczay, francke Verlag Tübingen 2008, 11 - 41.
- Antoine de Saint-Exupéry, Daz prinzelîn mit den bilden des tihtæres. Mittelhoch-deutsch. Ûz dem franzois gediutschet von Helmut Birkhan, Tintenfaß Neckarstein-ach 2008
- Nachantike Keltenrezeption. Projektionen keltischer Kultur, Verlag praesens Wien 2009, 898 S.
- Magie im Mittelalter (in: Beck'sche Reihe), München 2010, 205 S.
- Pflanzen im Mittelalter. Eine Kulturgeschichte, Wien – Köln – Weimar 2012; 310 S. Böhlau ISBN 978-3-205-78788-4
- Trug Tim eine so helle Hose nie mit Gurt? Zur Arkansprache besonders im Spätmittelalter und der frühen Neuzeit, in: Sprache und Geheimnis. Sondersprachenforschung im Spannungsfeld zwischen Arkanem und Profanem, hg. Christian Braun (= Lingua Historica Germanica, hg. von Stephan Müller, Jörg Riecke, Claudia Wich-Reif und Arne Ziegler Bd. 4), Akademie Verlag, Berlin 2012, 123–139
- Von der Gurke, den Reiternomaden und C3H6O3, in: Linguistica culinaria. Festgabe für Heinz-Dieter Pohl zum 70. Geburtstag, hg. Hubert Bergmann ‒ Regina M. Unterguggenberger, Wien 2012, 107–129
- Das Geheimwissen der Kelten. marixverlag Wiesbaden 2014, ISBN 978-3-86539-986-1
- Die Idee der Verwandlung von Lebewesen, in: Mitteilungen der Anthropologischen Gesellschaft in Wien 145 (2015), 201-236 (ISSN 0373-5656) [= umgearbei-tete Kurzform der Dissertation V 1]
- Spielendes Mittelalter, Böhlau Verlag Wien Köln Weimar 2018 ISBN 978-3-205-20648-4
- Der Beginn volkssprachlicher Schriftlichkeit im alten Britannien, in: Norbert Kössinger, Elke Krotz, Stephan Müller, Pavlína Rychterová [Hrsg.], Anfangsgeschichten ‒ Origin Stories. Der Beginn volkssprachlicher Schriftlichkeit in komparatisti-scher Perspektive. The Rise of Vernacular Literacy in a Comparative Perspective (= Mittelalterstudien 31), Paderborn 2018 ISBN 978-3-7705-6346-3, S. 219–257.
- Kindheit in Wien: Weltkriegs- und Nachkriegs-Zeit aus Kindersicht, Vitalis 2021 ISBN 978-3-89919-679-5
