= Otto Gschwantler =

Austrian philologist (1930-2016)

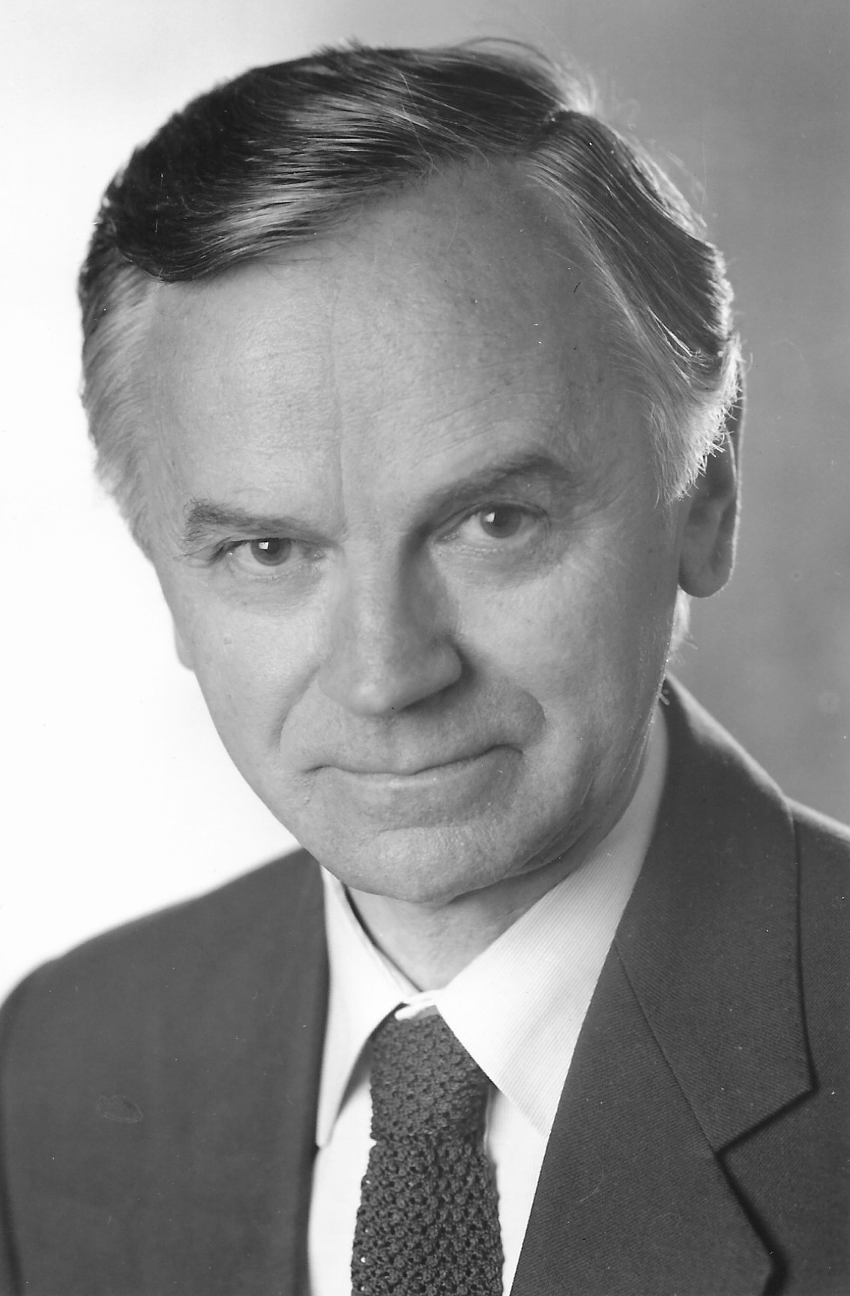
- Gschwantler on his sixtieth birthday
- Born: April 13, 1930; Tyrol, Austria
- Died: October 31, 2016 (aged 86); Vienna, Austria
- Awards: Sub auspiciis Praesidentis; Knight's Cross of the Order of the Falcon

Academic background
- Education: LMU Munich; University of Vienna
- Academic advisor: Otto Höfler

Academic work
- Discipline: Philology
- Sub-discipline: Germanic philology
- Institutions: University of Vienna
- Notable students: Rudolf Simek
- Main interests: Early Germanic literature

Otto Gschwantler (13 April 1930 – 31 October 2016) was an Austrian philologist who was head of the Institute for Germanic Studies at the University of Vienna. He specialized in the study of early Germanic literature.

== Biography ==
Otto Gschwantler was born in Brixen im Thale in Tyrol, Austria, on 13 April 1930. His father was a shoemaker. Initially trained as a shoemaker by his father, Gschwantler studied at LMU Munich under Otto Höfler. Gschwantler became a close assistant of Höfler, whom he accompanied to the University of Vienna in 1957. At Vienna, Gschwantler gained his PhD with a thesis on early Germanic literature. For this thesis he was awarded the Sub auspiciis Praesidentis by President Adolf Schärf, which is the highest possible distinction for academic achievements in Austria. Gschwantler was known for his humility. He habilitated under the supervision of Höfler in 1971 with a thesis on Germanic philology. Along with Helmut Birkhan and Peter Wiesinger, Gschwantler belonged to the circle of Höfler's closest students, who jokingly called themselves the "Drachenrunde" ("dragon club").

Gschwantler was a specialist on the Eddas, runology, early Germanic literature and the Christianization of the Germanic peoples. Gschwantler led the Institute for Germanic Studies at the University of Vienna, until 1996. In 1992, after a long effort, Gschwantler succeeded in establishing Scandinavian Studies as a distinct study at the University. He eventually retired as professor emeritus, but continued to teach and research, particularly on his native Southern Bavarian dialect.

Gschwantler was a devout Roman Catholic and actively engaged in mountain sports. He contracted Parkinson's disease in his later life after a traffic accident, and was for many years admirably cared for by his beloved wife Gertraud. Gschwantler died in Vienna on 31 October 2016 at the age of 86.

== Selected works ==
- Christus, Thor und die Midgardschlange. In: Festschrift für Otto Höfler zum 65. Geburtstag. Hrsg. Helmut Birkhan und Otto Gschwantler. Bd. I, Wien 1968, S. 145–168.
- Versöhnung als Thema einer heroischen Sage. In: Beiträge zur Geschichte der deutschen Sprache und Literatur (West) 97 (1975), S. 230–262.
- Die Heldensage von Alboin und Rosimund. In: Festgabe für Otto Höfler zum 75. Geburtstag. Hrsg. Helmut Birkhan. Wien, Stuttgart 1976 (= Philologica Germanica 3), S. 214–254.
- Formen langobardischer mündlicher Überlieferung. In: Jahrbuch für Internationale Germanistik 11 (1979), S. 58–85.
- Älteste Gattungen germanischer Dichtung. In: Neues Handbuch der Literaturwissenschaft, Bd.6. Europäisches Frühmittelalter. Hgrs. Klaus von See. Wiesbaden 1985, S. 91–123.
- Zeugnisse zur Dietrichsage in der Historiographie von 1100 bis gegen 1350. In: Heldensage und Heldendichtung im Germanischen. Hrsg. Heinrich Beck. Berlin/New York 1988 (= Ergänzungsbände zum Reallexikon der Germanischen Altertumskunde 2), S. 35–80.
- Heldensage als Tragoedia. In: 2. Pöchlarner Heldenliedgespräch. Die historische Dietrichepik. Hrsg.: Klaus Zatloukal. (= Philologica Germanica 13). Wien 1992, S. 39–67.
- Runeninschriften als Quelle der Frömmigkeitsgeschichte. In: Runeninschriften als Quellen interdisziplinärer Forschung. In Zusammenarbeit mit Sean Nowak, Hrsg. Klaus Düwel. Berlin / New York 1998 (= Ergänzungsbände zum Reallexikon der Germanischen Altertumskunde 15), S. 738–765.
- Vollständige Bibliographie der wissenschaftlichen Schriften in: Otto Gschwantler, Heldensage und Bekehrungsgeschichte. Gesammelte Aufsätze zur germanischen Heldensage in der Historiographie des Mittelalters und zur Bekehrungsgeschichte Skandinaviens. Hrsg. Rudolf Simek, Wien 2010, S. 507–511.

== See also ==
- Rudolf Much
- Hermann Reichert
- Robert Nedoma
- Klaus Düwel
- Wilhelm Heizmann
- Kurt Schier
- Wolfgang Lange (philologist)
- Heinrich Beck (philologist)

== Sources ==
- Birkhan, Helmut (13 November 2016). "Nachrufe auf Univ.-Prof. Dr. Otto Gschwantler". University of Vienna.
- Reichert, Hermann; Zimmermann, Günter, eds. (1990). Helden und Heldensage: Otto Gschwantler zum 60. Geburtstag. Philologica Germanica (in German). Vol. 11. Fassbaender. ISBN 3900538166.
- Tatzreiter, Herbert [in German] (7 November 2016). "Nachrufe auf Univ.-Prof. Dr. Otto Gschwantler". University of Vienna.
