= Jan de Vries (philologist) =

Dutch philologist (1890–1964)

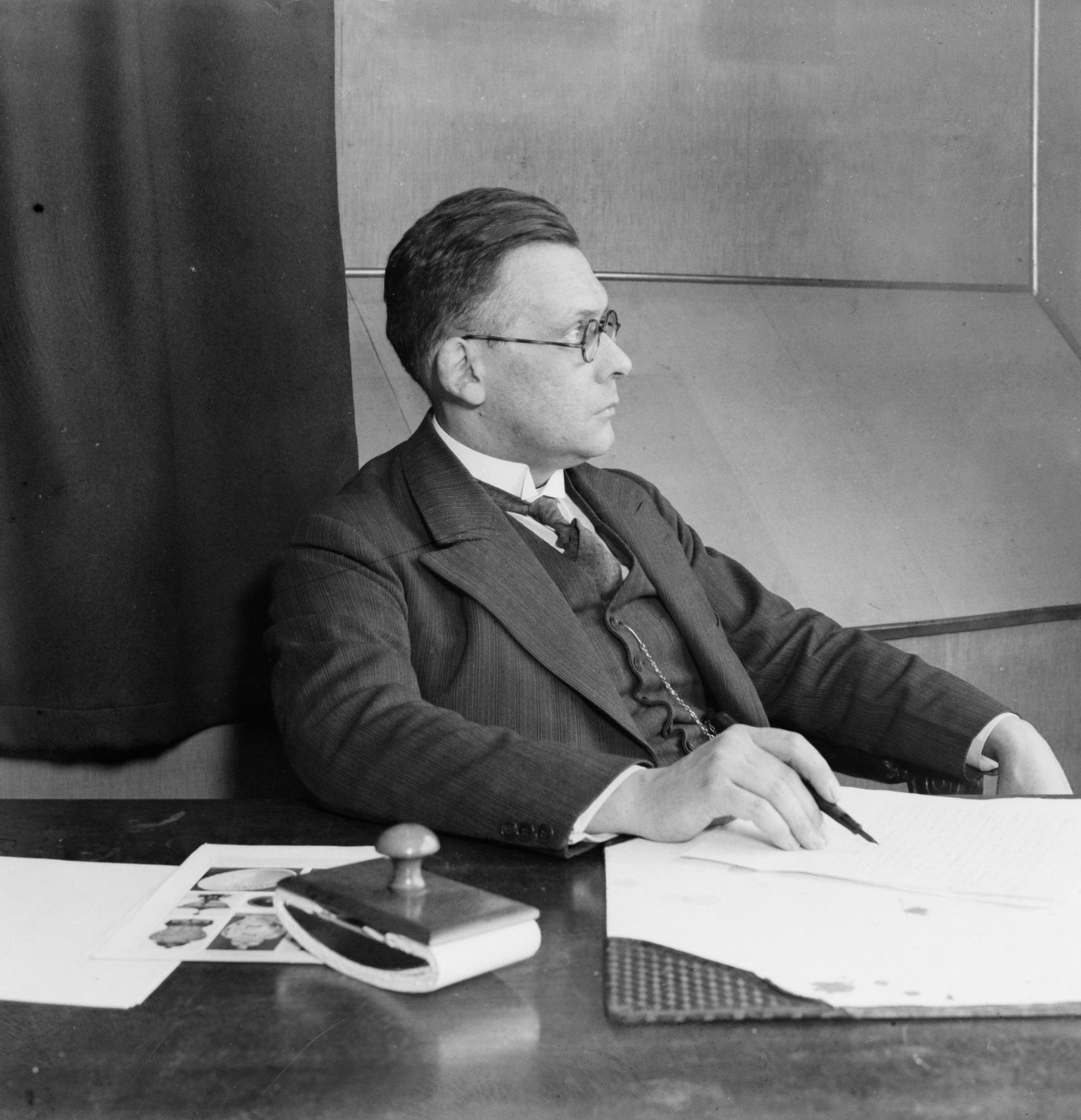
- Born: 11 February 1890; Amsterdam, Netherlands
- Died: 23 July 1964 (aged 74); Utrecht, Netherlands
- Spouse: Maria Machteld Vogel (m. 1915)
- Children: 3

Academic background
- Education: University of Amsterdam; Leiden University
- Thesis: Studiën over Faerörsche balladen (1915)
- Doctoral advisor: Richard Constant Boer
- Influences: Georges Dumézil

Academic work
- Discipline: Philology
- Sub-discipline: Celtic studies; Germanic studies; Indo-European studies
- Institutions: University of Leiden
- Main interests: Germanic linguistics; Germanic religion; Old Norse literature
- Notable works: Altgermanische Religionsgeschichte (1935-1937); Altnordische Literaturgeschichte (1941-1942); Altnordisches etymologisches Wörterbuch (1961); Nederlands etymologisch woordenboek (1961-1971)
- Influenced: Georges Dumézil; Jost Trier; Hans Kuhn; Gabriel Turville-Petre; Edgar C. Polomé; Otto Höfler; Werner Betz; René Derolez; Rudolf Simek

Jan Pieter Marie Laurens de Vries (11 February 1890 – 23 July 1964) was a Dutch philologist, linguist and religious studies scholar who specialized in Germanic studies.

A polyglot, De Vries studied Dutch, German, Sanskrit and Pali at the University of Amsterdam from 1907 to 1913, and gained a PhD in Nordic languages from the University of Leiden in 1915 with great distinction. Subsequently, authoring a number of important works on a variety of subjects, De Vries was in 1926 appointed Chair of Ancient Germanic Linguistics and Philology at the University of Leiden. In subsequent years, De Vries played an important role at Leiden as an administrator and lecturer, while publishing a number of important works on Germanic religion and Old Norse literature. Combined with his university duties, De Vries was a leading member of the Maatschappij der Nederlandse Letterkunde and the Royal Academy of Dutch Language and Literature, led several civil organizations, edited a number of encyclopedias and magazines, and was instrumental in establishing folklore studies as a scientific discipline.

De Vries collaborated with the Nazis during World War II. When democracy was restored in the Netherlands in 1945, he was imprisoned for several years, fired from his university, expelled from the learned societies in which had previously been a leading member, and deprived of the right to vote. He eventually received permission to work as a secondary school teacher in Oostburg. Living in isolation, and with his entire library having been destroyed during the war, De Vries committed himself to writing. In subsequent years, he authored a number of influential works on Celtic religion, Old Norse and Dutch etymology, and revised second editions of his works on Germanic religion and Old Norse literature. His works on these subjects have formed a central basis for modern research, and have remained standard texts up to the present day.

== Early life ==
Jan Pieter Marie Laurens de Vries was born in Amsterdam, Netherlands, on 11 February 1890. He was the son of the teacher Laurens de Vries, and Anthonetta Christina Vermast.

After having graduated from the Hogere Burgerschool, De Vries studied Dutch, German, Sanskrit and Pali under Jan te Winkel at the University of Amsterdam from 1909 to 1913, where he received his BA and MA with great distinction. De Vries became a polyglot. He gained his PhD at the University of Leiden in 1915 under the supervision of Richard Constant Boer. His dissertation, Studiën over Faerörsche balladen (1915), examined Faroese literature, and was received with critical acclaim.

De Vries was drafted into the Dutch Army in 1914, serving in North Brabant during World War I. He retired as an officer in 1919. De Vries recounted his experiences in the war in the novel Een singeling in the mass (1918), which was published under the pseudonym Jan van Lokeren. De Vries was appointed a high school teacher in Arnhem in 1919. In 1920 De Vries was on a four-month study trip to Norway, where he became acquainted with the Scandinavian and Finnish language. Contemporary with his teaching duties in Arnhem, De Vries wrote a number of important works, including De Wikingen in de lage landen bij de zee (1923), Henrik Ibsen (1924), and Geschiedenis der Nederlandsche letterkunde (1925).

== Career at the University of Leiden ==
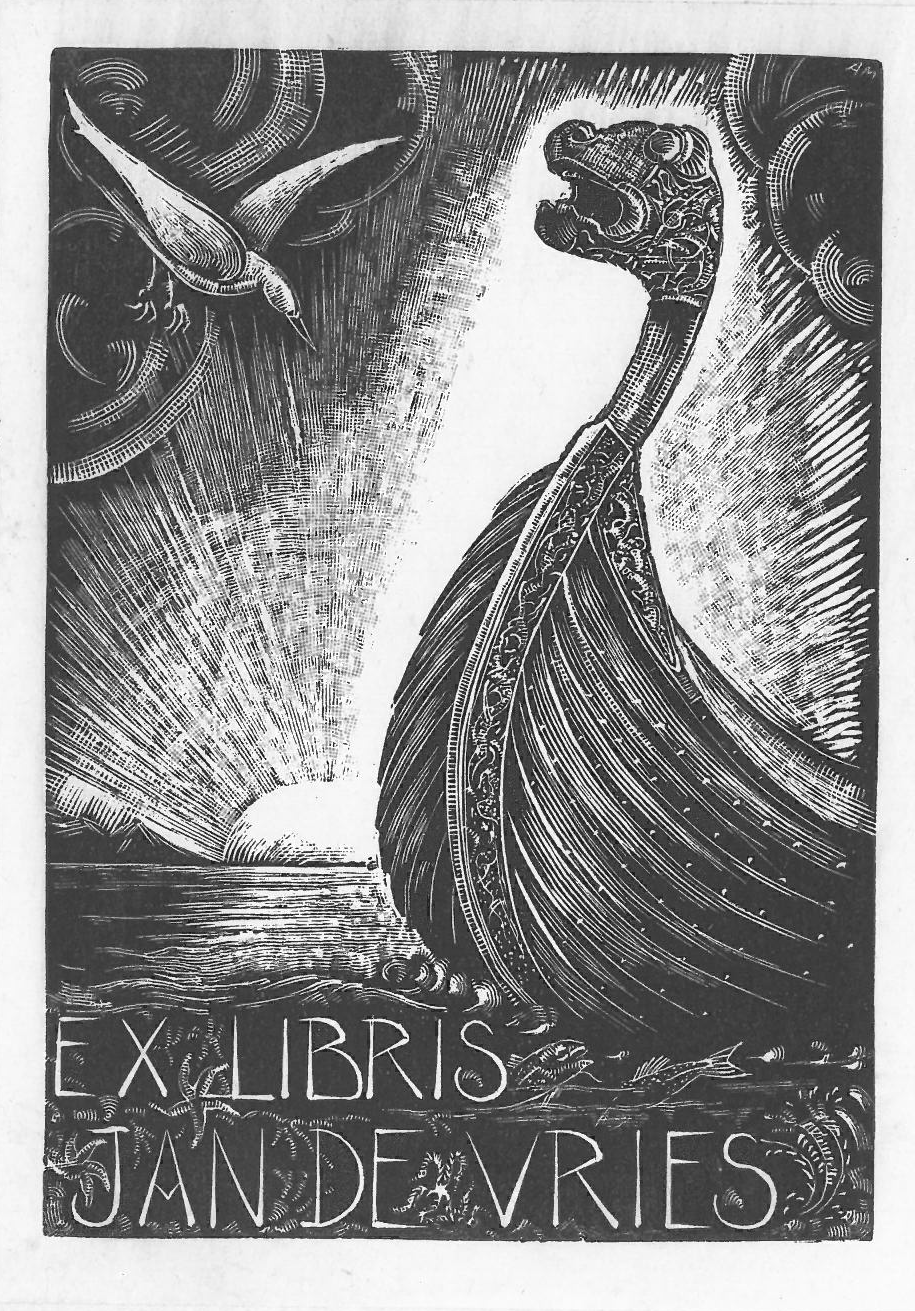
An ex libris plate from a book belonging to Jan de Vries.

In 1926, De Vries was appointed Chair of Ancient Germanic Linguistics and Philology at the University of Leiden. This post also covered Indo-European studies. At Leiden, De Vries taught Indo-European and Germanic linguistics, with a particular focus on the literature of the early Germanic peoples. Reconstructing early Germanic culture and presenting it to the public became a lifelong passion for De Vries.

At Leiden, De Vries endowed himself as a teacher, organizer and scholar and productivity. Students of De Vries would later describe him as a good teacher, and his ability in this regard is showcased by the number of doctoral theses that were completed under his supervision. He was a productive writer; this enabled him to write a number of works intended for popular audiences.

De Germaansche oudheid (1930) by De Vries introduced the ancient Germanic peoples to the Dutch public, and was a great success. It was later published in a second edition under title De Germanen (1941). He was the editor and driving force behind the fifth edition of Winkler Prins's Algemene encyclopedie (General Encyclopedia), which was published in 16 volumes in 1932–1938. From 1934 to 1939, De Vries was chairman of the prestigious Maatschappij der Nederlandse Letterkunde.

By the early 1930s, De Vries was recognized as the world's foremost authority on Germanic religion. As such, De Vries was requested to write the volume on Germanic religion for Hermann Paul's Grundriss der germanischen Philologie. The resulting Altgermanische Religionsgeschichte (1935–1937) was published in German in two volumes. In Altgermanische Religionsgeschichte, De Vries expressed opposition to Nordicism and doubts about the continuity of Germanic culture up until modern times, which put him at odds with the dominant Nazi ideology in Germany at the time. His translation of the Edda was published in 1938, and reprinted in 1971. It has been described as "a small literary masterpiece". In 1938, with sponsorship from the Maatschappij der Nederlandse Letterkunde and the Royal Academy of Dutch Language and Literature, he established the Bibliotheek der Nederlandsche letteren, a series of Dutch literary works.

During the 1930s, De Vries argued strongly in favor of establishing folklore studies as a distinct scientific discipline. He believed that fairy tales could be considered extensions of myths. In 1934, he helped establish the Interuniversitaire Commissie ter Voorbereiding van een Volkskundeatlas. In 1937, he was appointed Chairman of the International Society for Ethnology and Folklore. He was also editor of the folklore magazine Folk. It was thanks to De efforts of De Vries that folklore study was established as a scientific discipline in the Netherlands in the 1930s. In 1938, De Vries was admitted to the Royal Netherlands Academy of Arts and Sciences, and was appointed Chairman of its Folklore Committee.

== World War II ==
During the occupation of the Netherlands by Nazi Germany during World War II, De Vries served as vice-chairman of the Nederlandsche Kultuurkamer, whose approval was required for any artistic or literary production in the Netherlands during this time. In 1940, shortly after the Battle of the Netherlands, De Vries authored the pamphlet Naar een betere toekomst (Toward a Better Future), where he expressed his opposition to democracy and argued in favor of a German victory in the war. From 1940 to 1941, De Vries was Chairman of the Algemeen-Nederlands Verbond, an organization working towards closer cooperation between Netherlands and Flanders. Throughout the war, he published articles on runes and Germanic religion with Nazi publishers, worked for the Hamer, contributed to Ahnenerbe projects, and in 1943 he became a "sympathizing member" of the Germanic SS. Working under the Nederlandse Kultuurkamer, he expressed sympathy and support for Nazism in radio broadcasts and publications. Although he collaborated with Nazis, his scholarly works do not display any features of Nazi ideology. He refused to join the National Socialist Movement in the Netherlands. Nazi leaders did not believe that De Vries was an adherent of Nazism and doubted his loyalty.

De Vries' most important work produced during the war is his two-volume Altnordische Literaturgeschichte (1941–1942). It provides a general literary history of Old Norse literature.

It eventually became clear that the German position in the war was losing and the Netherlands was likely to revert to Allied control. In September 1944, de Vries and his wife fled to Leipzig, Germany.

== Post-war career ==
On 27 February 1946 De Vries was dismissed from the University of Leiden due his political beliefs. He was also expelled from the Royal Netherlands Academy of Arts and Sciences and the Maatschappij der Nederlandse Letterkunde. De Vries was eventually arrested and interned in Vught from 10 October 1946. In May–June 1948, the Bijzonder Gerechtshof found De Vries guilty of "intellectual collaboration", and deprived him of the right to vote and hold political office.

Jan de Vries (1890–1964) is usually considered the greatest Germanic studies scholar of the 20th century. ... Thanks to his vast knowledge, familiarity with the source material of ancient Northern Europe, and abilities as a synthesizer, De Vries must be considered one of the greatest social scientists of his generation.

— Stefan Arvidsson, Professor of the History of Religions at Stockholm University

After his release from prison, De Vries had no income, and was thus permitted to resume working as a secondary school teacher in Dutch literature in Oostburg. The decision to permit De Vries to work again was met with criticism due to his past political crimes. After retiring from teaching in 1955, De Vries resumed his scholarly work. Although he lived in almost complete isolation and had lost his entire library during the war, this was a time of remarkable productivity for him. In 1956–1957, he published a second revised edition of Altgermanische Religionsgeschichte, which remains his most famous and influential work. In this second revised edition, De Vries lent critical support to the trifunctional hypothesis of Georges Dumézil. Altgermanische Religionsgeschichte has constituted the standard work on Germanic (including Old Norse) religion up to the present day.

After his relocation to Utrecht in 1957, a number of important works were published, including Kelten und Germanen (1960), Keltische Religion (1961) and Forschungsgeschichte der Mythologie (1961). His Altnordisches etymologisches Wörterbuch (1961) was finally published after many years of work. Towards the end of his life, De Vries worked mainly on his Nederlands etymologisch woordenboek (1961–1971). He died in Utrecht on 23 July 1964.

== Legacy ==
Altnordische Literaturgeschichte by De Vries was published in a second revised edition in 1964–1967. It has remained the standard work on Old Norse literature up to the present day.

The remaining volumes of Nederlands etymologisch woordenboek were completed by Felicien de Tollenaere. De Vries' publications on Old Norse literature, Dutch etymology and Germanic religion have formed the basis for modern research on the subjects, and have remained standard reference works up to the present day. Stefan Arvidsson describes De Vries as the greatest Germanic studies scholar of the 20th century, and as one of the foremost social scientists of his generation. It is likely that his works will continue to form the basis of modern research for many years to come.

== Personal life ==
De Vries married Maria Machteld Vogel on 10 October 1915. Together they had three children, two girls and one boy.

== Selected works ==
- Studiën over Færösche balladen, diss. Amsterdam, 1915; Heidelberg: Rother, 1922.
- De Wikingen in de lage landen bij de zee, Haarlem, 1923.
- translation: Henrik Ibsen, Zes Voordrachten, Maastricht, 1924.
- De Germaansche oudheid, Haarlem, 1930.
- Contributions to the Study of Othin: Especially in his Relation to Agricultural Practices in Modern Popular Lore, FFC 94, Helsinki, 1931.
- The Problem of Loki, FFC 110, Helsinki, 1932.
- Altgermanische Religionsgeschichte, 2 vols. Vol. 1, (Grundriß der germanischen Philologie 12.1), Berlin-Leipzig: de Gruyter, 1935, 2nd rev. ed. 1956, Vol. 2 (Grundriß der germanischen Philologie 12.2), Berlin-Leipzig: de Gruyter, 1937, 2nd rev. ed. 1957 (3rd ed. 1970, repr. 2000).
- Wulfilae Codices Ambrosiani Rescripti, Epistularum Evangelicarum Textum Goticum Exhibentes, Phototypice editi et prooemio instructi a Jano de Vries, Bibliothecae Ambrosianae Codices quam simillime expressi, 3 vols., Turin, 1936.
- Edda, vertaald en van inleidingen voorzien, Amsterdam, 1938, 2nd rev. ed. Amsterdam, 1942, (3rd ed. 1943, 4th ed. 1944, 5th ed. 1952, 6th ed. 1978, 7th ed. 1980, 8th ed. 1988).
- De Germaansche oudheid, 1930; rev. ed. as De Germanen, Haarlem, 1941.
- De wetenschap der volkskunde (Hoekstenen onzer volkskultuur 1), Amsterdam, 1941.
- Altnordische Literaturgeschichte, 2 vols. Vol. 1 (Grundriß der germanischen Philologie 15), Berlin-Leipzig: de Gruyter, 1941, 2nd rev. ed. 1964 repr. 1970, Vol. 2 (Grundriß der germanischen Philologie 16), Berlin: de Gruyter, 1942, rev. ed. 1967 repr. 1970 (3rd ed. 1 vol. 1999 ISBN 3-11-016330-6 ).
- Die geistige Welt der Germanen, Halle a.d. Saale: Niemeyer, 1943 (2nd ed. 1945, 3rd ed. Darmstadt, 1964).
- De goden der Germanen, Amsterdam, 1944.
- Het Nibelungenlied, 2 vols. Vol 1 Sigfried, de held van Nederland, Vol. 2 Kriemhilds wraak, Antwerp, 1954.
- Etymologisch woordenboek: Waar komen onze woorden en plaatsnamen vandaan?, Utrecht-Antwerp, 1958; 2nd rev. ed. 1959.
- Heldenlied en heldensage, Utrecht-Antwerp, 1959; tr. as Heroic Song and Heroic Legend, Oxford, 1963.
- Kelten und Germanen (Bibliotheca Germanica 9), Bern, 1960.
- Altnordisches etymologisches Wörterbuch, Leiden, 1961 (2nd ed. 1963).
- Keltische Religion (Die Religionen der Menschheit 18), Stuttgart, 1961.
- Godsdienstgeschiedenis in vogelvlucht, Utrecht-Antwerp, 1961.
- Forschungsgeschichte der Mythologie (Orbis Academicus 1.7), Freiburg, 1961.
- (with Felicien de Tollenaere) Nederlands etymologisch woordenboek (NEW), Leiden: Brill, 1961–1971; 2nd edn. 1987 (all later editions (1992, 1997 etc.) are reprints).
- Woordenboek der Noord- en Zuidnederlandse plaatsnamen, Utrecht-Antwerp, 1962.

== See also ==
- Hector Munro Chadwick
- Gabriel Turville-Petre
- Sophus Bugge
- Magnus Olsen
- Birger Nerman
- Rudolf Much
- Otto Höfler
- Werner Betz
- Rudolf Simek
- René Derolez
- Gudmund Schütte
- Lee M. Hollander
- Winfred P. Lehmann
- Edgar C. Polomé
- Leo Weisgerber
- Vilhelm Grønbech
- Hermann Güntert
- Franz Rolf Schröder
- Wolfgang Krause
- Einar Haugen

== Sources ==
- Bolle, K. W. (1965). "Jan de Vries (1890-1964)". History of Religions. 5 (1). University of Chicago Press: 173–177. doi:10.1086/462520. JSTOR 1061809. S2CID 161502970.
- Bolle, Kees W. (2005) [1987]. "Vries, Jan de". In Jones, Lindsay (ed.). Encyclopedia of Religion. Vol. 14 (2 ed.). Macmillan Reference USA. pp. 9643–9644. ISBN 0-02-865983-X.
- Van der Hoeven, H. (November 12, 2013) [1985]. "Vries, Jan Pieter Marie Laurens de (1890-1964)". Biografisch Woordenboek van Nederland (in Dutch).
- Van der Stroom, Gerrold (January 2010). "Vries, Jan Pieter Marie Laurens de". Digital Library for Dutch Literature (in Dutch).
- Quak, Arend (2006). "Vries". Reallexikon der Germanischen Altertumskunde (in German). Vol. 32. Walter de Gruyter. pp. 651–654. ISBN 978-3-11-018387-0.
