= Peter Wiesinger =

Austrian philologist (1938–2023)

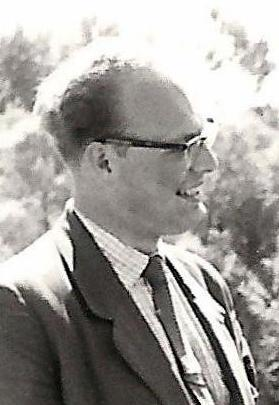
- Wiesinger in 1960
- Born: 15 May 1938; Vienna, Austria
- Died: 23 June 2023 (aged 85)

Academic background
- Education: University of Vienna; University of Marburg
- Doctoral advisor: Otto Höfler

Academic work
- Discipline: Germanic philology
- Institutions: University of Marburg; University of Vienna
- Main interests: History of the German language German dialects

Peter Wiesinger (15 May 1938 – 23 June 2023) was an Austrian philologist who specialized in Germanic studies.

== Biography ==
Peter Wiesinger was born in Vienna, Austria on 15 May 1938. He received his PhD at the University of Vienna, was subsequently a researcher on German at the University of Marburg. Wiesinger habilitated at Marburg in 1969 and was appointed a professor there in 1971.

From 1972 to 2006, Wiesinger was Professor of German Language and Old German Literature at the University of Vienna, succeeding Eberhard Kranzmayer. He was President of the International Association for Germanic Studies from 1995 to 2000, and served as its Honorary President from 2001. He was a member of the Austrian Academy of Sciences and the Polish Academy of Learning.

Wiesinger died on 23 June 2023, at the age of 85.

== See also ==
- Heinrich Beck
- Hermann Reichert
- Helmut Birkhan
- Rudolf Simek
- Wilhelm Heizmann
- Otto Gschwantler
