= Sophus Bugge =

Norwegian linguist (1833–1907)

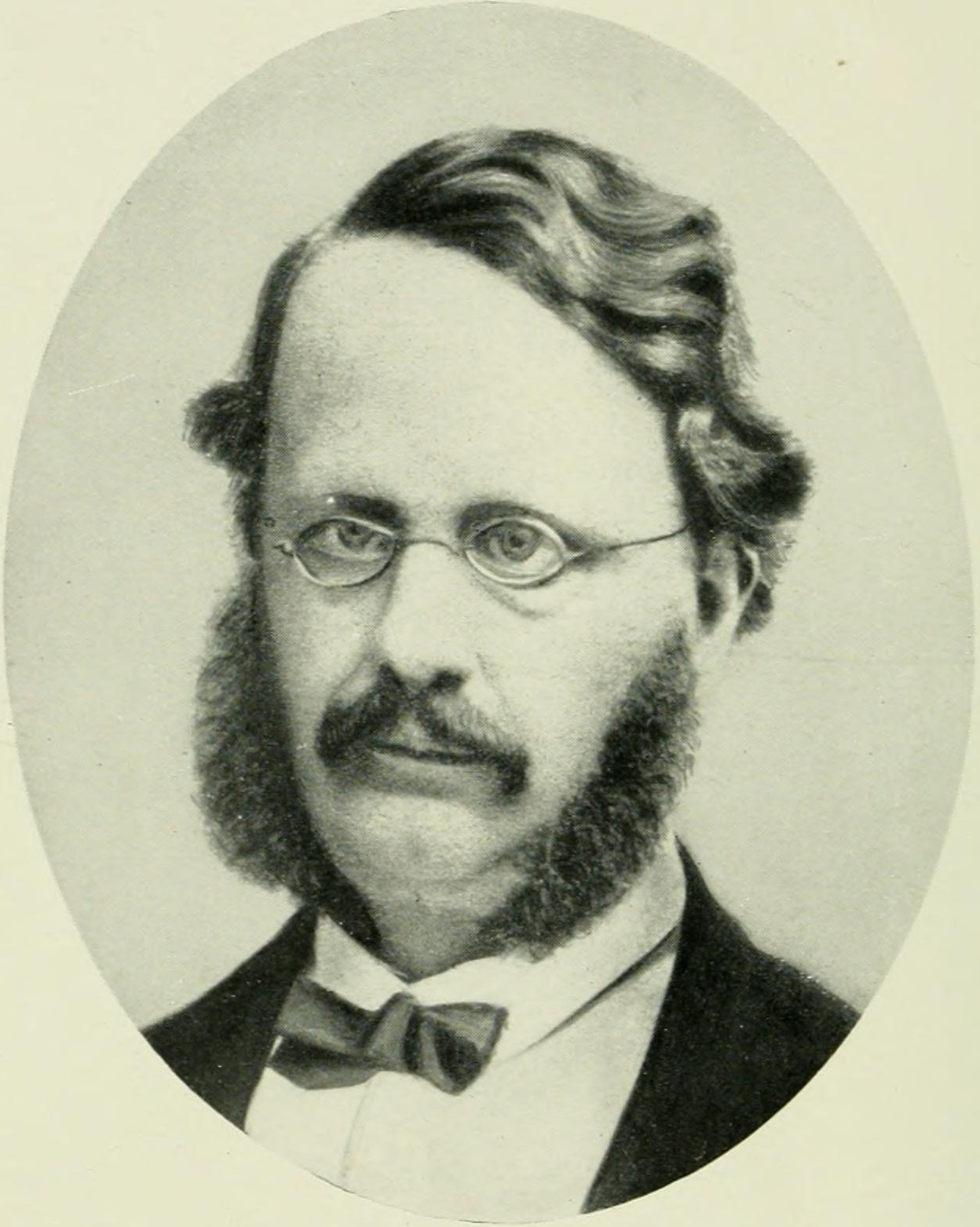
- Born: 5 January 1833; Larvik, Norway
- Died: 8 July 1907 (aged 74); Christiana, Norway
- Known for: Contributions to Norse philology; Bugge's canon; Bugge's rule
- Spouse: Karen Sophie Schreiner (m. 1869; died 1897)
- Scientific career
- Fields: linguistics, historical linguistics, Old Norse
- Institutions: Christiana University

Elseus Sophus Bugge (5 January 1833 – 8 July 1907) was a Norwegian philologist and linguist. His scholarly work was directed to the study of runic inscriptions and Norse philology. Bugge is best known for his theories and his work on the runic alphabet and the Poetic Edda and Prose Edda.

== Background ==
Bugge was born in Larvik, in Vestfold county, Norway. His ancestors had been merchants, ship owners and captains of the Larvik for several generations. Bugge was a Candidatus magisterii (1857) and research fellow in comparative linguistics and Sanskrit (1860). He was educated in Christiania, Copenhagen and Berlin.

== Career ==
In 1866, he became professor of comparative philology, comparative Indo-European linguistics and Old Norse at Christiania University now the University of Oslo. In addition to collecting Norwegian folksongs and traditions and writing on Runic inscriptions, he made considerable contributions to the study of the Celtic, Romance, Oscan, Umbrian and Etruscan languages. His scientific work was of fundamental importance for the Norse philology and runic research.

In his 1881 work, Studier over de nordiske Gude- og Heltesagns Oprindelse (Studies on the Origin of the Nordic Legends of Gods and Heroes), Bugge theorized that nearly all myths in Old Norse literature derive from Christian and late classical concepts. Bugge's theories were generally vehemently rejected, but have had some influence.

Bugge was the author of a very large number of books on philology and folklore. His principal work, a critical edition of the Poetic Edda (Norrœn Fornkvæði), was published at Christiania in 1867. He maintained that the Eddic poems and the earlier sagas were largely founded on Christian and Latin tradition imported into Scandinavian literature by way of England. His writings also include Gamle Norske Folkeviser (1858), a collection of Old Norse folk-songs; Bidrag til den ældste skaldedigtnings historie (Christiania, 1894); Helge-digtene i den Ældre Edda (Copenhagen, 1896, Eng. trans., The Home of the Eddic Poems, 1899); Norsk Sagafortælling og Sagaskrivning i Island (Christiania, 1901), and various books on runic inscriptions.

By 1902, Bugge's vision had become so poor that he could no longer read. Professor and linguist Magnus Olsen, who was Bugge's assistant and successor, read and described new discoveries of inscriptions. Bugge's final works regarding original rune scripture were not completed before he died. They were released between 1910 and 1913 through the efforts of Professor Olsen.

== Honors ==
Bugge was a member of the Scientific Society of Christiania (now The Norwegian Academy of Science) from 1858 (vice president 1884), The Royal Norwegian Scientific Society in Trondheim (1865) and a number of foreign societies. He was made honorary doctor at Uppsala University in 1877. He was appointed a Knight of the Royal Norwegian Order of St. Olav in 1877, Commander Grand Cross 1890 and 1896.

== Personal life ==
Bugge was married during 1869 to Karen Sophie Schreiner (1835–1897). His son, Alexander, was a historian of the mediaeval period.

== Selected works ==
- Gamle norske Folkeviser (1858)
- Norrøne Skrifter af sagnhistorisk Indhold (1864–73)
- Norrœn Fornkvæði (1867)
  - Fortale XLVI: Argument against Hrafna-galdr Óðins.
- Studier over de nordiske Gude- og Heltesagns Oprindelse. Første Række (1881–89)
- Om Runeindskrifterne paa Rök-stenen i Östergötland og paa Fonnaas-Spænden fra Rendalen i Norge, Stockholm (1888)
- Bidrag til den ældste Skaldedigtnings Historie (1894)
- Hønen-Runerne fra Ringerike, hf. 1 i Norges Indskrifter med de yngre Runer (1902)
- Runerne paa en sølvring fra Senjen, hf. 2 i Norges Indskrifter med de yngre Runer (1906)
- Norges Indskrifter med de ældre Runer. Indledning: Runeskriftens Oprindelse og ældste Historie (with M. Olsen), (posthumous) 1905–13
- Der Runenstein von Rök in Östergötland (with M. Olsen), (posthumous) 1910

== See also ==
- Peter Andreas Munch
- Jan de Vries (philologist)
- Gudmund Schütte
- Birger Nerman
- Gabriel Turville-Petre
- Hector Munro Chadwick
- Bertha Phillpotts
- Rudolf Much
- Otto Höfler
- René Derolez
- Lee M. Hollander
- Wolfgang Krause
- Georges Dumézil
- E. V. Gordon
- John Lindow
