= Edith Marold =

German philologist

- Born: 2 July 1942 (age 84); Salzburg, Reichsgau Salzburg, Germany

Academic background
- Education: University of Vienna
- Academic advisor: Otto Höfler

Academic work
- Discipline: Germanic studies
- Sub-discipline: Old Norse studies
- Institutions: Saarland University; University of Kiel
- Main interests: Germanic Antiquity

Edith Marold (born 2 July 1942) is an Austrian philologist who specializes in Germanic studies.

== Biography ==
Edith Marold was born in Salzburg, Germany on 2 July 1942. She received her Ph.D. in Germanic studies at the University of Vienna in 1967 with a thesis on blacksmiths in Germanic Antiquity. Marold subsequently worked at the Saarland University, where she habilitated in Germanic and Nordic philology in 1977. She subsequently served as Head of the Old Germanic Department of the Institute for Germanic Studies of the Saarland University. Since 1989, Marold was Professor of Old Germanic and Nordic Philology at the University of Kiel. She retired from Kiel in 2007, but has continued to teach and research.

== See also ==
- Rudolf Simek
- Klaus Düwel

== Sources ==
- Kürschners Deutscher Gelehrten-Kalender, 4 Teilbände. De Gruyter: Berlin (23. Ausgabe) 2011. ISBN 978-3-598-23630-3
