= René Derolez =

Belgian philologist

René Lodewijk Maurits Derolez
- Born: 7 September 1921; Aalst, Belgium
- Died: 24 March 2005 (aged 83); Bruges, Belgium

Academic background
- Education: Ghent University; Harvard University

Academic work
- Discipline: Philology
- Sub-discipline: Germanic philology
- Institutions: Ghent University
- Main interests: Germanic religion; Old English literature; Runology

René Lodewijk Maurits Derolez (7 September 1921 – 24 March 2005) was a Belgian philologist who was Professor of English and Germanic Philology at Ghent University. He specialized in runology and the study of Old English literature and Germanic religion.

== Biography ==
René Lodewijk Maurits Derolez was born in Aalst, Belgium on 7 September 1921. During the German occupation of Belgium during World War II, Derolez studied Germanic philology at Ghent University. He served in the Allied forces during the liberation of Belgium. Derolez subsequently received a scholarship from the Belgian American Educational Foundation, and studied at Harvard University from 1946 to 1948. He received an MA at Harvard and his PhD summa cum laude at Ghent in 1947. He gained his habilitation at Ghent in 1954 with the thesis Runica Manuscripta. Runica Manuscripta has remained a standard work on runology up to the present day.

After gaining his habilitation, Derolez became a lecturer at Ghent, and was in 1959 appointed Professor of English and Germanic Philology at the Ghent University. From 1962 to 1964, Delorez was also Dean of the Faculty of Philosophy at Ghent University. He retired from the Ghent University in 1984.

Delorez was elected a Member of the Royal Flemish Academy of Belgium for Science and the Arts in 1970. He was elected a Corresponding Member of the British Academy in 1971. Delorez was Co-Editor of Anglo Saxon England in 1972 and Co-Editor of English Studies from 1964 to 1979, serving as its Editor in 1970. In 1983 he was elected the founding President of the International Society of Anglo-Saxonists.

Delorez specialized in the study of early Germanic culture, particularly runes, Old English literature (particularly Beowulf) and Germanic religion and Germanic mythology. His books on Germanic religion won him wide acclaim, and were translated into several languages.

During his studies at Harvard, Delorez met Gabrielle von Steiger, daughter of Swiss politician Eduard von Steiger, and the two subsequently married. His brother Albert Derolez was a medievalist and professor at the Free University of Brussels.

Delorez died in Aalst on 24 March 2005.

== See also ==
- Jan de Vries
- Otto Höfler
- Edgar C. Polomé
- Rudolf Much
- Wolfgang Krause
- Georges Dumézil
- Franz Rolf Schröder
- Gabriel Turville-Petre

== Selected works ==
- Runica Manuscripta, 1953
- Götter und Mythen der Germanen , 1959
- Les Celtes et les Germains, 1965
- The Origin of the Runes, 1998

== Sources ==
- Albert Derolez: René Derolez (1921 – 2005). In: Alfred Bammesberger, Gabriele Waxenberger (eds.): Das fuþark und seine einzelsprachlichen Weiterentwicklungen, Ergänzungsbände zum Reallexikon der Germanischen Altertumskunde Vol. 51. De Gruyter, Berlin – New York 2006. ISBN 978-3-11-092298-1
- Vandenbergen, Anne-Marie (16 February 2015). "Derolez, René (1921-2005)". Ghent University (in Dutch).
