= Werner Betz =

German philologist

- Born: 1 September 1912; Frankfurt, Germany
- Died: 13 July 1980 (aged 67); Munich, Germany

Academic background
- Academic advisor: Theodor Frings
- Influences: Georges Dumézil

Academic work
- Discipline: Philology
- Sub-discipline: Germanic philology
- Institutions: LMU Munich

Werner August Josef Betz (1 September 1912 – 13 July 1980) was a German philologist who was Chair of German and Nordic Philology at LMU Munich.

== Biography ==
Werner Betz was born in Frankfurt, Germany on 1 September 1912. He gained a PhD in 1936 with a dissertation on Latin influence on Germanic. From 1937 to 1940, with a grant from the Deutsche Forschungsgemeinschaft, Betz was a research assistant of Theodor Frings. He served in the Kriegsmarine during World War II. After the war, Betz became Chair of German and Nordic Philology at LMU Munich. He died in Munich on 13 July 1980.

Betz was considered an expert on Germanic Antiquity. His writings on Germanic mythology were influenced by the theories of Georges Dumézil.

== Selected works ==
- Der Einfluss des Lateinischen auf den althochdeutschen Sprachschatz. 1: Der Abrogans, 1936
- Deutsch und Lateinisch: die Lehnbildungen der althochdeutschen Benediktinerregel, 1949
- (Publisher and Contributor) Taylor Starck: Festschrift; [... presented to Professor emeritus Taylor Starck by his friends, colleagues, and pupils on the occasion of his seventy-fifth birthday october fifteenth, nineteen hundred and sixty-four], 1964

== See also ==
- Otto Höfler
- Jost Trier
- Wolfgang Krause

== Sources ==
- Christina Bürger: Betz, Werner. In: Christoph König (ed.): Internationales Germanistenlexikon 1800–1950. Vol. 1: A–G. De Gruyter, Berlin/New York 2003 [Reprint 2011], ISBN 978-3-11-090805-3, pp. 169–170
- Strutynski, Udo (1974). "History and Structure in Germanic Mythology". In Larson, Gerald J.; Puhvel, Jaan; Littleton, C. Scott (eds.). Myth in Indo-European Antiquity. University of California Press. pp. 29–50. ISBN 0-520-02378-1.
