= Hermann Reichert =

Austrian philologist

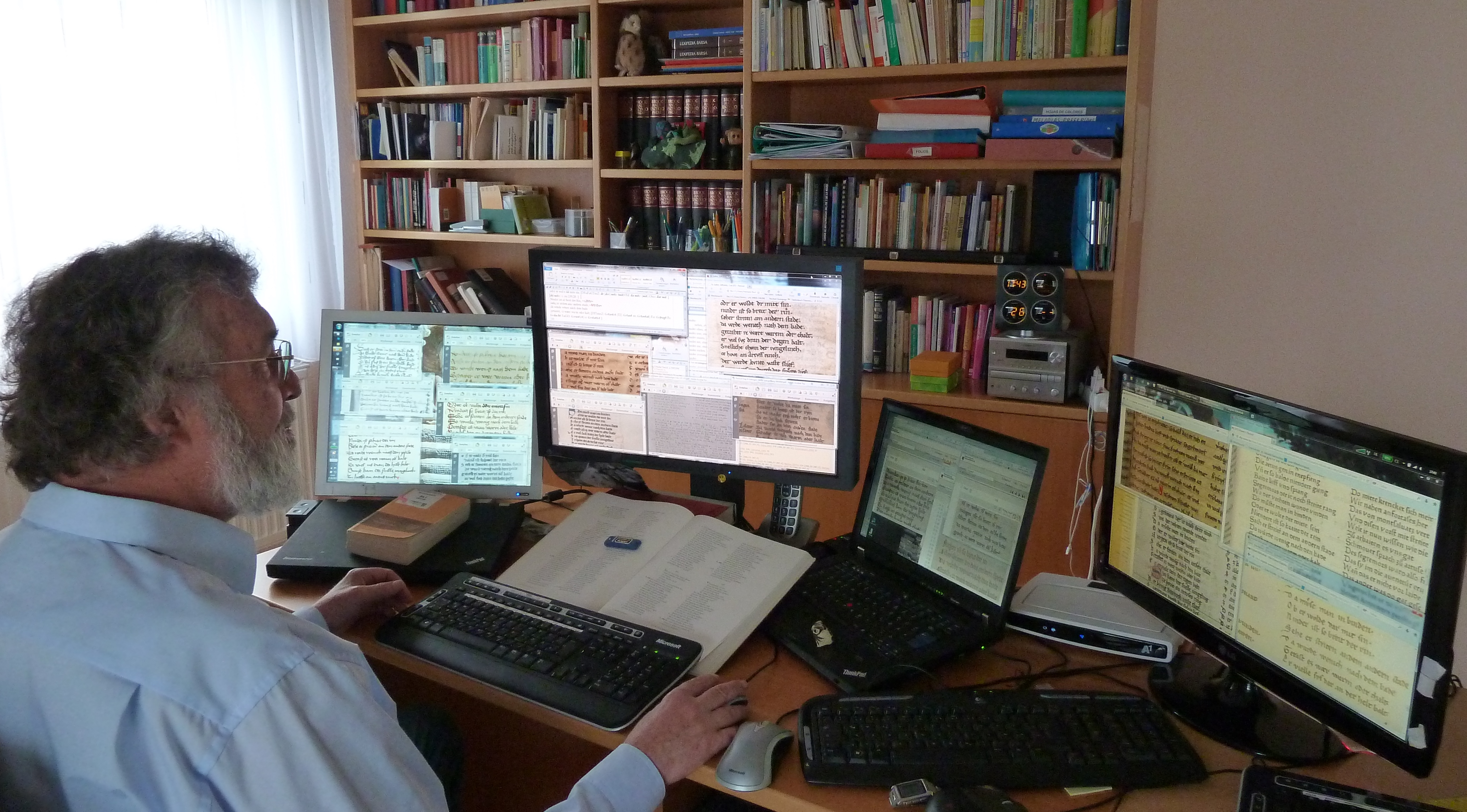
- Hermann Reichert at his desk, working on Wolfram von Eschenbach's Parzival
- Born: 7 April 1944 (age 82); Pernitz, Austria

Academic background
- Education: University of Vienna
- Doctoral advisor: Otto Höfler
- Other advisor: Helmut Birkhan

Academic work
- Discipline: Germanic philology
- Institutions: University of Vienna
- Main interests: Early Germanic culture
- Notable works: Lexikon der altgermanischen Namen (1984)

Hermann Reichert (born 7 April 1944) is an Austrian philologist at the University of Vienna who specializes in Germanic studies.

== Biography ==
Hermann Reichert was born in Pernitz, Austria, on 7 April 1944. He received his PhD in Germanic philology at the University of Vienna in 1971. His dissertation was supervised by Otto Höfler. He completed his habilitation in Old German and Nordic philology at the University of Vienna in 1984 under the supervision of Helmut Birkhan. Until his retirement in 2009, Reichert was associate professor at the Institute for German Studies at the University of Vienna, where he continues to teach and research.

== Research ==
Reicherts research focuses on Middle High German and Old Norse literature, Germanic names, runology and early Germanic culture. He is a known authority on the Nibelungenlied. His 1984 habilitation, Lexikon der altgermanischen Namen, is considered the standard reference work on Germanic names. Reichert has written a large number of books and articles, and was formerly an editor of Philologica Germanica. Reichert wrote many articles for the second edition of the Reallexikon der Germanischen Altertumskunde, of which he was co-editor.

== Selected works ==
- Wiedergabe der wulfilanischen Medien und Tenuen im späten Ostgermanischen, 1971
- Nibelungenlied und Nibelungensage, 1985
- Lexikon der Altgermanischen Personennamen, 1987
- Walther von der Vogelweide für Anfänger, 2009
- Heldensage und Rekonstruktion: Untersuchungen zur Thidrekssaga, 1992
- Das Nibelungenlied. Nach der St. Galler Handschrift, 2005
- Konkordanz zum Nibelungenlied nach der St. Galler Handschrift, 2006
- Wolfram von Eschenbach, Parzival für Anfänger, 2017
- Wolfram von Eschenbach, Parzival. Band 1: Text, 2019
- Wolfram von Eschenbach, Parzival. Band 2: Untersuchungen, 2019
- Nibelungenlied-Lehrwerk, 2019
- Minne. Eine Vorlesung, 2020

== See also ==
- Rudolf Much
- Otto Gschwantler
- Rudolf Simek
- Heinrich Beck (philologist)
- Dennis Howard Green
- Leslie Peter Johnson
- Brian O. Murdoch

== Sources ==
- "Hermann Reichert, Prof. Dr". German Academic Exchange Service.
