= Sabine Strasser =

Austrian anthropologist

- Born: 1962 (age 62–63); Wernstein am Inn, Austria
- Occupation: academic
- Years active: 1995–present
- Known for: Migration studies and the humanitarian treatment of migration and integration

Sabine Strasser (born 1962) is an Austrian social anthropologist who specializes in migration and gender issues. She evaluates the political nature of transnational relationships, particularly with regard to diversity and multiculturalism. She was one of the first researchers hired when the University of Vienna's founded its Inter-University Coordination Center of Women's Studies in 1993. She has taught at the University of Vienna and the Middle East Technical University in Ankara, Turkey. Since 2013, she has served as a professor at the University of Bern.

== Early life and education ==
Sabine Strasser was born in 1962 in Wernstein am Inn, Austria. In 1981, she began her undergraduate studies at the University of Vienna in social and cultural anthropology with an emphasis on African and Turkish studies. During the same time frame, she began working at the Birlikte Öğrenelim (Women's Association for Turkish Migrant Women) and continuing her studies at the University of Vienna, she graduated with a Ph.D. in social anthropology in 1994, completing her thesis on gender concerns and obsession, which analyzed observations in a Turkish village located on the Black Sea.

== Career ==
In 1995, Strasser began working as a researcher at the Inter-University Coordination Center of Women's Studies in Vienna. The office to coordinate women's studies had been founded in 1993 and Ingvild Birkhan was appointed as its director in 1994. That year, the inaugural staff, including Strasser, Margit Baier, Anette Baldauf, Andrea Eckhart, Renate Retschnig, and Susanne Rieser, were hired to begin work the following term. Though continuing to work at the Coordinating Center through 1999, Strasser began teaching as a lecturer at the University of Vienna in 1997. In 2002, she became a senior lecturer and in 2004, habilitated after completing a thesis evaluating how transnational politics impacted Turkish and Kurdish activists.

From 2007 to 2011, Strasser was an associate professor at the Middle East Technical University in Ankara, Turkey. In May 2011, she was awarded a full professorship at the University of Vienna in the faculty of social sciences. In 2013, she became the director of Social Anthropology Studies at the University of Bern and since 2021, has also served as co-chair, with Bilgin Ayata of the University of Basel, for the Research Association of Switzerland and Turkey.

== Research ==
From the beginning of her career, Strasser has evaluated the ethics and political implications of policy on migrant communities as they relate to class, cultural, and religious differences of women. She explores differing notions of citizenship and how those intersect with rights, particularly as changing means of policing borders impacts migrants. In works such as the anthology Multikulturalismus queer gelesen (Multiculturalism, Read Queer), Strasser evaluates how social concepts of tolerance play out with ethnic and gender minorities in a multicultural environment. The essays evaluate how cultural attitudes, practices, and norms are disrupted as society transforms. Drawing from field evidence collected in an Austrian village with decades of migration history, the collection focused on how knowledge of societal norms is integrated in native and migrant communities and disconnect forms with regard to integration. Covering issues ranging from forced marriage, to gender violence, to homophobia, and sexual autonomy, the study questioned whether tolerance and assimilation of varying cultural norms can occur when there are varying and complex views of arrangement, coercion, and self-determination within the scheme of equality and freedom.

== Selected works ==
- Strasser, Sabine; Kronsteiner, Ruth (1993). "Impure or Fertile?: Two Essays on the Crossing of Frontiers Through Anthropology and Feminism". In del Valle, Teresa (ed.). Gendered Anthropology. Translated by Gingrich, Michael. London: Routledge. pp. 162–192. ISBN 978-0-415-06127-8. OCLC 605952434.
- Strasser, Sabine (2009). Bewegte Zugehörigkeiten: nationale Spannungen, transnationale Praktiken und transversale Politik [Moving Affiliations: National Tensions, Transnational Practices and Transversal Affiliations] (in German). Vienna: Turia + Kant. ISBN 978-3-85132-539-3.
- Strasser, Sabine; Holzleithner, Elisabeth, eds. (2010). Multikulturalismus queer gelesen: Zwangsheirat und gleichgeschlechtliche Ehe in pluralen Gesellschaften [Multiculturalism, Read Queer: Forced Marriage and Same-Sex Marriage in Plural Societies] (in German). Frankfurt am Main: Campus Verlag. ISBN 978-3-593-39172-4.
- Strasser, Sabine (2012). "2. Rethinking Citizenship in Multicultural Europe: Critical Encounters with Feminist, Multicultural and Transnational Citizenship". In Halsaa, Beatrice; Roseneil, Sasha; Sümer, Sevil (eds.). Remaking Citizenship in Multicultural Europe. Basingstoke, Hampshire: Palgrave Macmillan. pp. 21–40. ISBN 978-1-349-32511-5. OCLC 6994598572.
- Perl, Gerhild; Strasser, Sabine (September 2018). "Transnational Moralities: The Politics of Ir/Responsibility of and against the EU Border Regime". Identities. 25 (5). London: Routledge: 507–523. ISSN 1070-289X. OCLC 7850356514.
