= Wolfgang Lange =

Wolfgang Lange may refer to:

- Wolfgang Lange (philologist) (1915–1984), German philologist
- Wolfgang Lange (general) (1898–1988), German general
- Wolfgang Lange (canoeist) (1938–2022), German canoeist
