= Waltraud Hunke =

Austrian philologist

- Born: 28 April 1915; Kiel, Germany
- Died: 2004; Kiel, Germany

Academic background
- Education: Ludwig-Maximilians-Universität München
- Doctoral advisor: Otto Höfler

Academic work
- Discipline: Germanic philology
- Sub-discipline: German philology
- Institutions: Reichsuniversität Straßburg
- Main interests: Medieval German literature

Waltraud Hunke (28 April 1915 – 2004) was a German philologist, publisher and philanthropist who specialized in Germanic studies.

== Biography ==
Waltraud Hunke was born in Kiel, Germany on 28 April 1915, the daughter of the publisher Heinrich Hunke (1879-1953) and Hildegard Lau (1879-1944). Her mother was the daughter of engineer Thies Peter Lau (1844-1933) and Walewska Berta Anna Artelt (1856-1943). She had two sisters, including Sigrid Hunke.

Hunke received her Ph.D. in Germanic philology at the Ludwig-Maximilians-Universität München in 1941 under the supervision of Otto Höfler. She subsequently worked as an assistant to the historian Ernst Anrich and philologist Siegfried Gutenbrunner at Reichsuniversität Straßburg. After World War II, Hunke returned to her hometown of Kiel, where she made a fortune as a publisher and bookstore owner. She donated large sums to the University of Kiel, particularly for the purpose of supporting female academics. Upon the death of Hunke in 2004, her estate was donated to the University.

== See also ==
- Heinrich Beck (philologist)

== Selected works ==
- Die Trojaburgen und ihre Bedeutung. Dissertation. München 1941.
- Goethe-Gesellschaft Kiel 1947–1987. Goethe-Gesellschaft, Kiel 1987.
- mit Oswald Hauser, Wolfgang J. Müller: Das Haus Glücksburg und Europa. Mühlau, Kiel 1988, ISBN 3-87559-058-9.
- mit Thiel J. Martensen: 100 Jahre Universitätsbuchhandlung Walter G. Mühlau. Eine Chronik. Mühlau, Kiel 2002, ISBN 3-87559-089-9.

== Sources ==
- Friedrich Schmidt-Sibeth: Hunke, Heinrich. In: Biographisches Lexikon für Schleswig-Holstein und Lübeck. Wachholtz, Neumünster 1982–2011. Bd. 9 – 1991. ISBN 3-529-02649-2, S. 154.
