= Wolfgang Lange (philologist) =

German philologist

- Born: 29 June 1915; Kiel, Germany
- Died: 29 July 1984 (aged 69); Göttingen, Germany

Academic background
- Education: Kiel University; Ludwig-Maximilians-Universität München
- Doctoral advisor: Otto Höfler
- Other advisors: Hans Kuhn; Wolfgang Krause; Eduard Neumann

Academic work
- Discipline: Germanic studies
- Sub-discipline: Old Norse studies
- Institutions: University of Göttingen
- Notable students: Klaus Düwel
- Main interests: Early Germanic literature; Germanic Antiquity; Old Norse literature

Wolfgang Friedrich-Karl Lange (29 June 1915 – 29 July 1984) was a German philologist who specialized in Germanic studies.

== Biography ==
Wolfgang Lange was born in Kiel, Germany on 29 June 1915. After gaining his abitur in Wilhelmshaven in 1934, Lange did labor service in the Wehrmacht. Since 1935, Lange studied German, history, philosophy, anthropology, music and art at Kiel University. At Kiel, Lange came under the influence of Otto Höfler, who inspired himself to specialize in Germanic studies, particularly Old Norse studies. In 1939, Lange accompanied Höfler to the Ludwig-Maximilians-Universität München, where he gained his Ph.D. under the supervision Höfler with a thesis on dragons in early Germanic literature.

Lange served as an officer in the Wehrmacht throughout World War II. He was imprisoned at the end of the war, and was a slave laborer in a Polish mine until 1949. Lange's enslavement interrupted his academic career and left him in permanently poor health.

Upon the recommendation of Wolfgang Krause, Lange was in 1950 made an assistant of Ulrich Pretzel at the University of Hamburg. At Hamburg, Lange came under the influence of Hans Kuhn, who had a strong influence on him. Upon the recommendation of Krause and Eduard Neumann, Lange habilitated at Kiel in 1955 with a thesis on Christian Skaldic poetry. The thesis was printed in 1956, and became a standard work on the subject.

Lange joined the faculty of the University of Göttingen in 1956, where he in 1963 was appointed a professor. After the retirement of Krause in 1964, Lange was appointed Director of the Scandinavian Seminar at the University of Göttingen.

Lange became known as one of Germany's foremost authorities in the study of Germanic Antiquity. His strongest expertise was in early Germanic literature, especially Old Norse literature. In the 1960s he worked with Herbert Jankuhn and Hans Fromm on the third edition of Rudolf Much's commentary on Germania. Lange's assistant Klaus Düwel was also involved in this work. Lange was also interested in modern Scandinavian literature, such as the works of Knut Hamsun.

The health issues rising from Lange's years a slave laborer worsened as he became older, and Lange retired prematurely from Göttingen in 1977. He continued to be continued to his field of study, both as a writer and researcher, and as the editor of the journal Skandinavistik. Lange died in Göttingen on 29 July 1984.

== Sources ==
- Klaus Düwel: Wolfgang Lange. In: Christoph König (Hrsg.), unter Mitarbeit von Birgit Wägenbaur u. a.: Internationales Germanistenlexikon 1800–1950. Band 2: H–Q. De Gruyter, Berlin/New York 2003, ISBN 3-11-015485-4, S. 1053–1054 (kostenpflichtig bei de Gruyter Online).
- Fritz Paul: Wolfgang Lange (1915–1984) in memoriam. In: Skandinavistik 15, 2 (1985), S. 157–160.
