= Alfred Ebenbauer =

Austrian philologist

- Born: 13 October 1945; Sankt Michael in Obersteiermark, Austria
- Died: 11 August 2007 (aged 61); Vienna, Austria

Academic background
- Education: University of Vienna

Academic work
- Discipline: Germanic philology
- Sub-discipline: German philology; Old Norse philology
- Institutions: University of Heidelberg; University of Vienna
- Main interests: Medieval German literature; Old Norse literature

Alfred Ebenbauer (13 October 1945 – 11 August 2007) was an Austrian philologist who specialized in Germanic studies.

== Biography ==
Alfred Ebenbauer was born in Sankt Michael in Obersteiermark, Austria on 13 October 1945. He was the first of five children of an agrarian. He completed his Matura with distinction in Judenburg, and subsequently studied German literature and German history at the University of Vienna. He graduated Sub auspiciis Praesidentis in 1970 with a thesis on Old Norse literature.

From 1970 to 1978, Ebenbauer was a university assistant and lecturer at the Institute for Germanic Studies at the University of Vienna. He completed his habilitation in early Germanic languages and literature at Vienna in 1978. Ebenbauer subsequently lectured at the universities of Innsbruck and Heidelberg. In 1980, Ebenbauer was appointed Professor of Old German and Germanic Philology at the University of Heidelberg.

From 1981, Ebenbauer served as Chair of Old German Language and Literature at the University of Vienna. At Vienna, Ebenbauer also served as Dean of the Faculty of Social Sciences (1987-1990), and Rector (?-1998).

Ebenbauer was involved in many scholarly societies, and played an instrumental role in integrating the University of Vienna with the Erasmus Programme and the Socrates programme. From 2000 to 2006, Ebenbauer was President of the Österreichische Austauschdienst-Gesellschaft. He played a significant role in shaping the modern university system of Austria. For these services, Ebenbauer received the Grand Decoration of Honour in Gold for Services to the Republic of Austria in April 2005.

Ebenbauer committed suicide in Vienna on 11 August 2007. His farewell ceremony was conducted at the Feuerhalle Simmering on 23 August 2007. Ebenbauer was buried in an honorary grave at the Stammersdorfer Zentralfriedhof in Vienna.

== Selected works ==
- (Editor) Die Juden in ihrer mittelalterlichen Umwelt, Böhlau Wien 1991, ISBN 3-205-05342-7, zusammen mit Klaus Zatloukal
- (Editor) Universitätscampus Wien: Historie und Geist, Holzhausen Verlag 1998, ISBN 3-900518-97-1, zusammen mit Caspar Einem und Michael Häupl
- (Editor) Ältere deutsche Literatur: Eine Einführung, Literas 2000, 6. Auflage, ISBN 3-85429-171-X, zusammen mit Peter Krämer
- (Editor) Lexikon der antiken Gestalten in deutschen Texten des Mittelalters, de Gruyter, Berlin, New York 2003, ISBN 3-11-016257-1, zusammen mit Manfred Kern
- (Editor) Heinrich von dem Türlin: Die Krone, Verse 12288-30042, Max Niemeyer Verlag, Tübingen 2005, ISBN 3-484-20218-1, zusammen mit Florian Kragl

== Sources ==
- "Alfred Ebenbauer, o. Univ.-Prof. Dr. phil". University of Vienna.
- "Alfred Ebenbauer". University of Vienna.
