= Otto Höfler =

Austrian philologist (1901–1987)

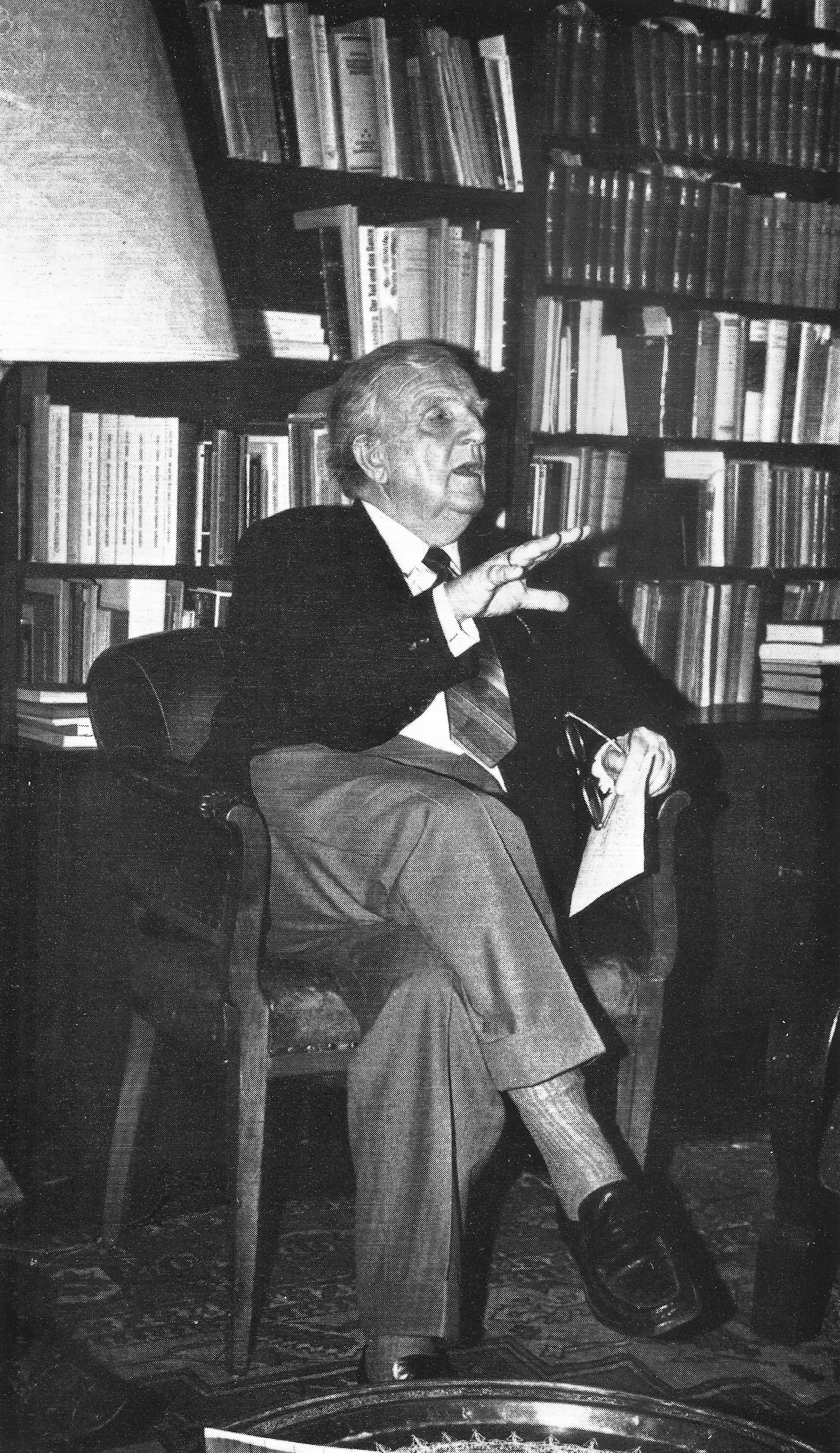
- Born: Otto Eduard Gottfried Ernst Höfler; 10 May 1901; Vienna, Austria-Hungary
- Died: 25 August 1987 (aged 86); Vienna, Austria

Academic background
- Education: University of Vienna
- Thesis: Altnordische Lehnwortstudien (1926)
- Academic advisors: Rudolf Much; Andreas Heusler
- Influences: Georges Dumézil

Academic work
- Discipline: Philology
- Sub-discipline: Germanic philology
- Institutions: University of Vienna; Ludwig-Maximilians-Universität München
- Doctoral students: Otto Gschwantler; Helmut Birkhan; Peter Wiesinger; Edith Marold; Hermann Reichert; Waltraud Hunke; Wolfgang Lange
- Notable students: Heinrich Beck; Klaus Düwel
- Main interests: Early Germanic culture; Medieval German literature; Old Norse literature
- Influenced: Stig Wikander; Georges Dumézil

Otto Eduard Gottfried Ernst Höfler (10 May 1901 – 25 August 1987) was an Austrian philologist who specialized in Germanic studies. A student of Rudolf Much, Höfler was Professor and Chair of German Language and Old German Literature at the University of Vienna. Höfler was also a Nazi from 1922 and a member of the SS Ahnenerbe before the Second World War. He was a close friend of Georges Dumézil and Stig Wikander, with whom he worked closely on developing studies on Indo-European society. He tutored a significant number of future prominent scholars at Vienna and was the author of works on early Germanic culture. Julia Zernack refers to him as the "perhaps most famous and probably most controversial representative" of the "Vienna School" of Germanic studies founded by Much.

== Early life and education ==
Otto Höfler was born in Vienna on 10 May 1901 to a highly educated upper middle class family. His father, Alois Höfler, was Professor of Philosophy and Pedagogy at the University of Vienna. Alois was a passionate admirer of Richard Wagner, and the author of a book on the Germanic god Odin. Otto's mother, Auguste Dornhöffer, was from Bayreuth and also a Wagner admirer. (Note: Perhaps more than this, Otto's mother was acquainted with Wagner's wife, Cosima, and personally corresponded with the wife of notorious racial theorist Houston Stewart Chamberlain.)

Höfler studied German and Nordic philology at the University of Vienna from 1920 to 1921 under Rudolf Much; the latter gaining notoriety for his study of Tacitus's Germania. Höfler joined the Wiener Akademischer Verein der Germanisten, a völkisch group of German academics in 1921. He joined the Austrian Nazi Party in 1922 after hearing Hitler speak in Vienna. Sometime in 1922, Höfler also became a member of the SA.

Between September 1921 and April 1922, Höfler was a guest student at Lund University in Sweden, where he studied modern Scandinavian languages and Nordic philology. He also studied at Kiel (under Andreas Heusler), Marburg, Basel, and completed his PhD at the University of Vienna in 1926 with the dissertation Altnordische Lehnwortstudien, which examined loanwords in Old Norse. Höfler's scholarly interests encompassed a wide array of intellectual disciplines that included history, philology, religion, cultural morphology, folklore studies, and historical linguistics.

== Career ==
From 1928 to 1934, Höfler was a lecturer in German at Uppsala University. At Uppsala, Höfler befriended the fellow philologists Stig Wikander and Georges Dumézil, who all remained lifelong friends and intellectual collaborators. He completed his habilitation at the University of Vienna in 1931 with the dissertation Kultische Geheimbünde der Germanen, which examined secret societies of the early Germanic peoples. It had a major influence on the future research of Wikander and Dumézil, who would later examine similar societies among Indo-Iranians and Indo-Europeans.

From 1935, he lectured at Kiel University, where he had been appointed chair of German philology, a promotion that was facilitated and influenced by both Walther Wüst—curator of the SS Ahnenerbe—and SS Reichsführer Heinrich Himmler, who was impressed by Höfler's research. Höfler was considered an "ideal candidate for the SS" for having provided expert opinions and lectures at SS training camps. In that same year he became a member of the selection committee for the Reichsberufswettkampf, an organization associated with the SS.

From 1938, Höfler was Professor and Chair of Germanic Philology and Ethnology at the Ludwig-Maximilians-Universität München. Much like his appointment at Kiel University, Wüst and Himmler made the necessary political maneuvers on Höfler's behalf to ensure he obtained his prestigious post at the Ludwig-Maximilians-Universität München. Also in 1938, Höfler became a leader of the SS Ahnenerbe, an organization he had joined in 1937, and which was also partially responsible for him receiving his position at the Ludwig-Maximilians-Universität München.

Höfler's ongoing research centered on early Germanic culture, particularly early Germanic religion and literature. German historian, Frank-Rutger Hausmann wrote that as a main player among the German Cultural Institutes, Höfler provided language courses for "Danish Gestapo agents". Höflers Deutsche Heldensage (1941), which examined Medieval German literature, was highly influential, and republished in 1961. Höfler argued in favor of cultural continuity between modern Germans and early Germanic peoples.

Sometime in 1945, Höfler was fired from the Ludwig-Maximilians-Universität München and was subsequently prohibited from teaching. In 1950, he received a license to teach Scandinavian studies. In 1954, Höfler was appointed Associate Professor of Nordic Philology and Germanic Antiquity at the Ludwig-Maximilians-Universität München. Although nominally Associate Professor, Höfler was for all practical purposes a full Professor during this time. Among his notable students at the Ludwig-Maximilians-Universität München were Heinrich Beck and Otto Gschwantler.

In 1957, Höfler was appointed Professor and Chair of German Language and Old German Literature at the University of Vienna. Gschwantler accompanied him as an assistant, and would eventually become a full professor. Höfler taught and supervised a number of scholars at Vienna, including Helmut Birkhan, Hermann Reichert, Peter Wiesinger, Erika Kartschoke, Edith Marold, Klaus Düwel, Waltraud Hunke and Wolfgang Lange. A group of Höfler's most dedicated students, which included Gschwantler, Birkhan, Wiesinger and Kartschoke, were known as the Drachenrunde ("dragon club"). Höfler played a notable role at the university as a host of seminaries and parties at his vineyard, and arranged excursions to Ravenna and other places, which were attended by his students and fellow professors and friends, such as Richard Wolfram and Eberhard Kranzmayer.

== Retirement and death ==
Höfler retired from teaching 1971, but continued to teach and research. After his retirement, Höfler worked on refining his earlier theories, and authored extensive studies on Dietrich von Bern and Siegfried, the two most important characters in Medieval German literature. He argued that Siegfried was derived from the Germanic chieftain Arminius, who defeated the Roman army in the Battle of the Teutoburg Forest in 9 AD.

Höfler died in Vienna on 25 August 1987.

== Legacy ==
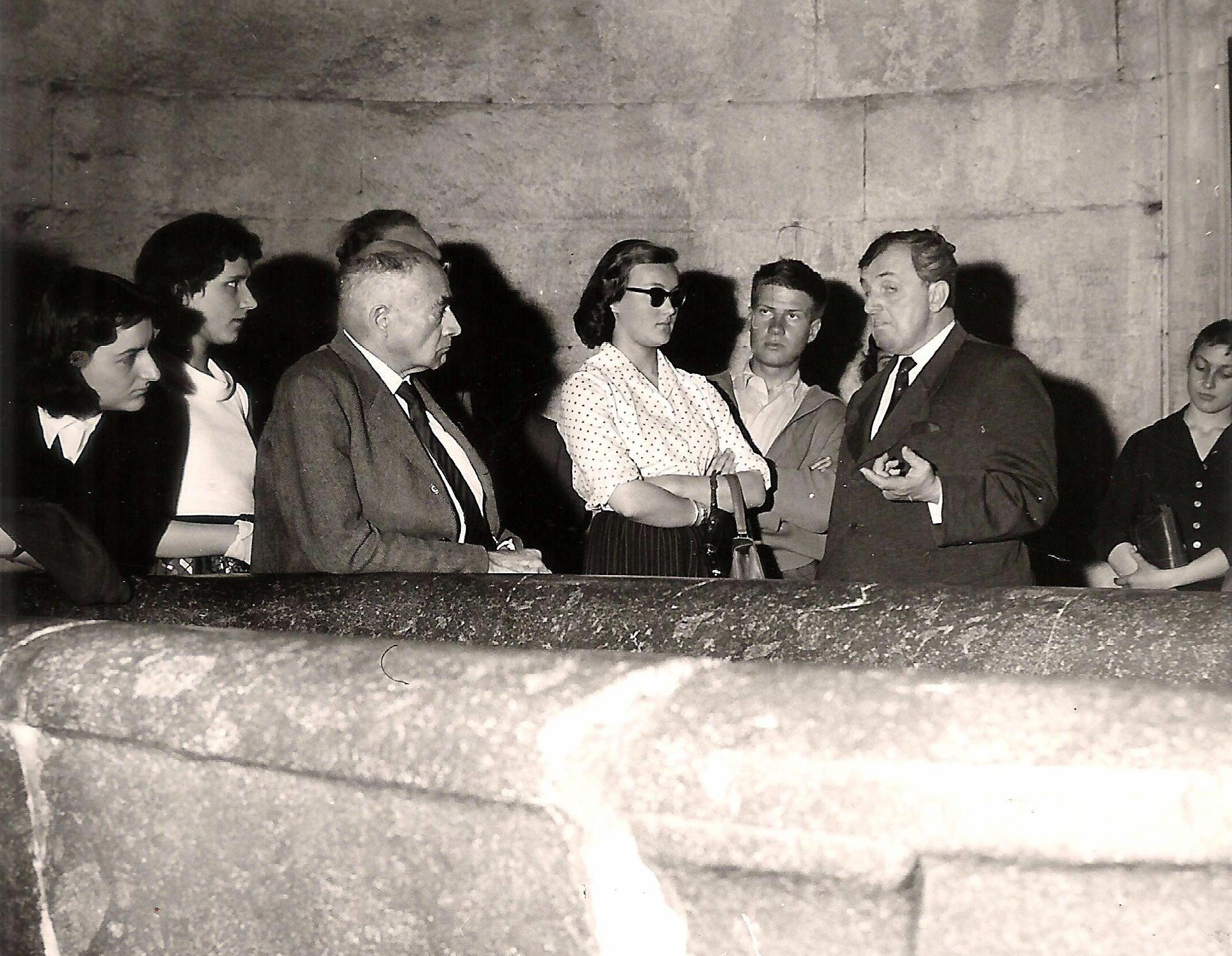
Otto Höfler lecturing his predecessor Dietrich Kralik and students during an excursion to the Mausoleum of Theodoric in Ravenna, Italy

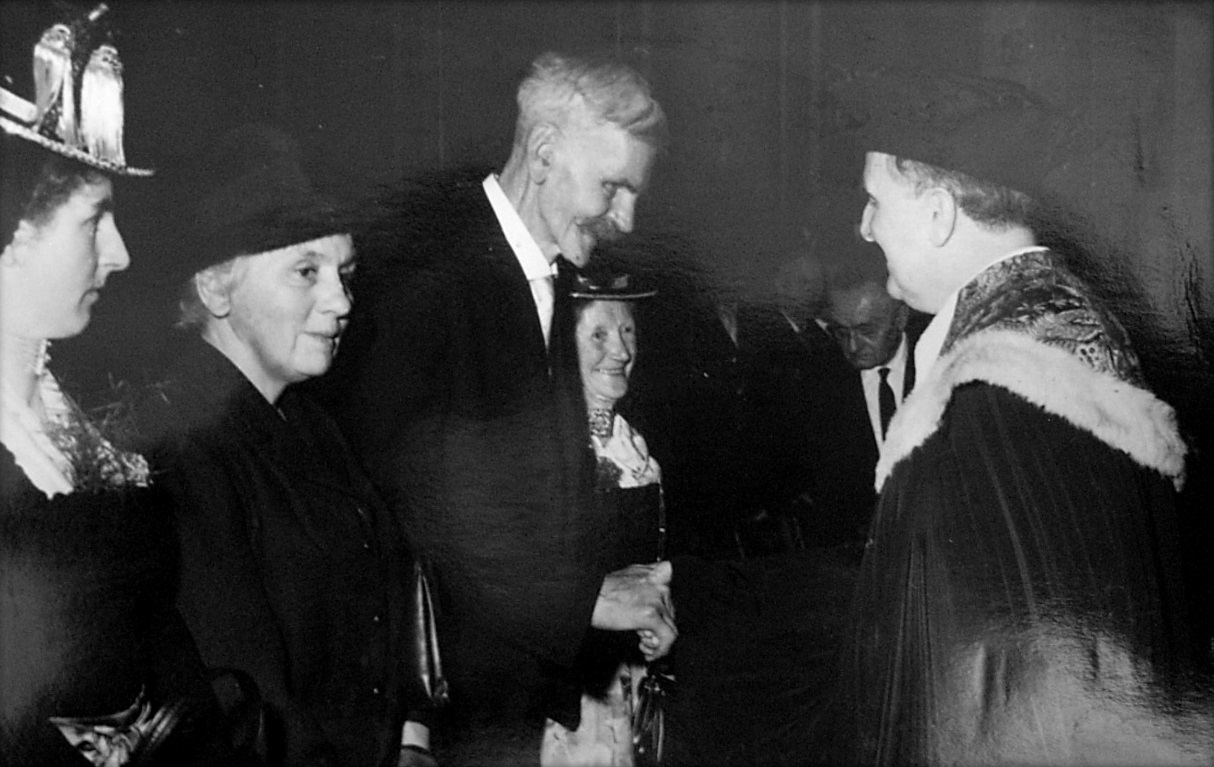
Otto Höfler congratulating the family of his student Otto Gschwantler as Gschwantler is awarded the Sub auspiciis Praesidentis by President Adolf Schärf for outstanding scholarship

Höfler's scholarship and legacy are controversial. Höfler had a major influence on Georges Dumézil's trifunctional hypothesis of Indo-European society. He worked closely with Dumézil and scholars such as Stig Wikander, Émile Benveniste and Jan de Vries on developing study on Indo-European mythology, and has been credited with having significantly contributed to reviving the field of comparative mythology.

According to archaeologist Neil Price, Höfler's early career may have been shaped by the political changes of the times, but the actual content of his works were of high quality and not tainted by political bias. (Note: To this end, Price claims that Höfler's "Kultische Geheimbunde der Germanen... is in many ways a work of brilliance... The direction of Höfler’s research was deliberate in the political climate of the times, but its actual content is generally free from such bias and is indeed of serious quality. Höfler’s work is still very relevant today...") Historian Elizabeth A. Rowe says that though criticized by some, Höfler's key theories have never been refuted. (Note: Rowe explicitly writes on Höfler's cultist beliefs, avowing that his "argument for the existence of a cult group of warriors linked with Óðinn has found objections but no real refutation.") Price argues Höfler's research has continued to be of great relevance up to the present day.

On the other hand, Julia Zernack argues that Höfler’s work is "an example of the self-subjugation of Germanic scholarship to völkisch-nationalistic and National Socialistic ideologies." Jan Hirschbiegel argues that Höfler's work served less to uncover new academic knowledge than to create an ideological foundation for the National Socialist state, that Höfler's cultic group of Odin's warriors was meant as spiritual predecessor of the National Socialist "death cult" and its "death symbolism", and that Höfler never distanced himself from the völkisch elements of his earlier work.

Wolfgang Behringer and Klaus von See similarly point to his Kultische Geheimbünde der Germanen as, in Behringer's words, a "sensationalist apology for the SS". Courtney Marie Burrell writes that while several of Höfler's ideas have become popular or achieved consensus in scholarship as of 2023, the scholars who have accepted them ignore the ideological background of Höfler's theories, the essentially unprovable nature of his main theses, and the objections of other folklorists.

== Selected works ==
- Kultische Geheimbünde der Germanen, Frankfurt am Main, 1934
- Das germanische Kontinuitätsproblem, Hamburg 1937
- Die politische Leistung der Völkerwanderungszeit, 1937
- Friedrich Gundolf und das Judentum in der Literaturwissenschaft, 1940
- Deutsche Heldensage, 1941
- Germanisches Sakralkönigtum, 1952
- Balders Bestattung und die nordischen Felszeichnungen, 1952
- Zur Diskussion über den Rökstein, 1954
- Das Opfer im Semnonenhain und die Edda, 1952
- Der Sakralcharakter des germanischen Königtums, 1956
- Goethes Homunculus, 1963
- Verwandlungskulte, Volkssagen und Mythen, 1973
- Theoderich der Große und sein Bild in der Sage, 1975
- Siegfried, Arminius und der Nibelungenhort, 1978
- Kleine Schriften, 1992

== See also ==
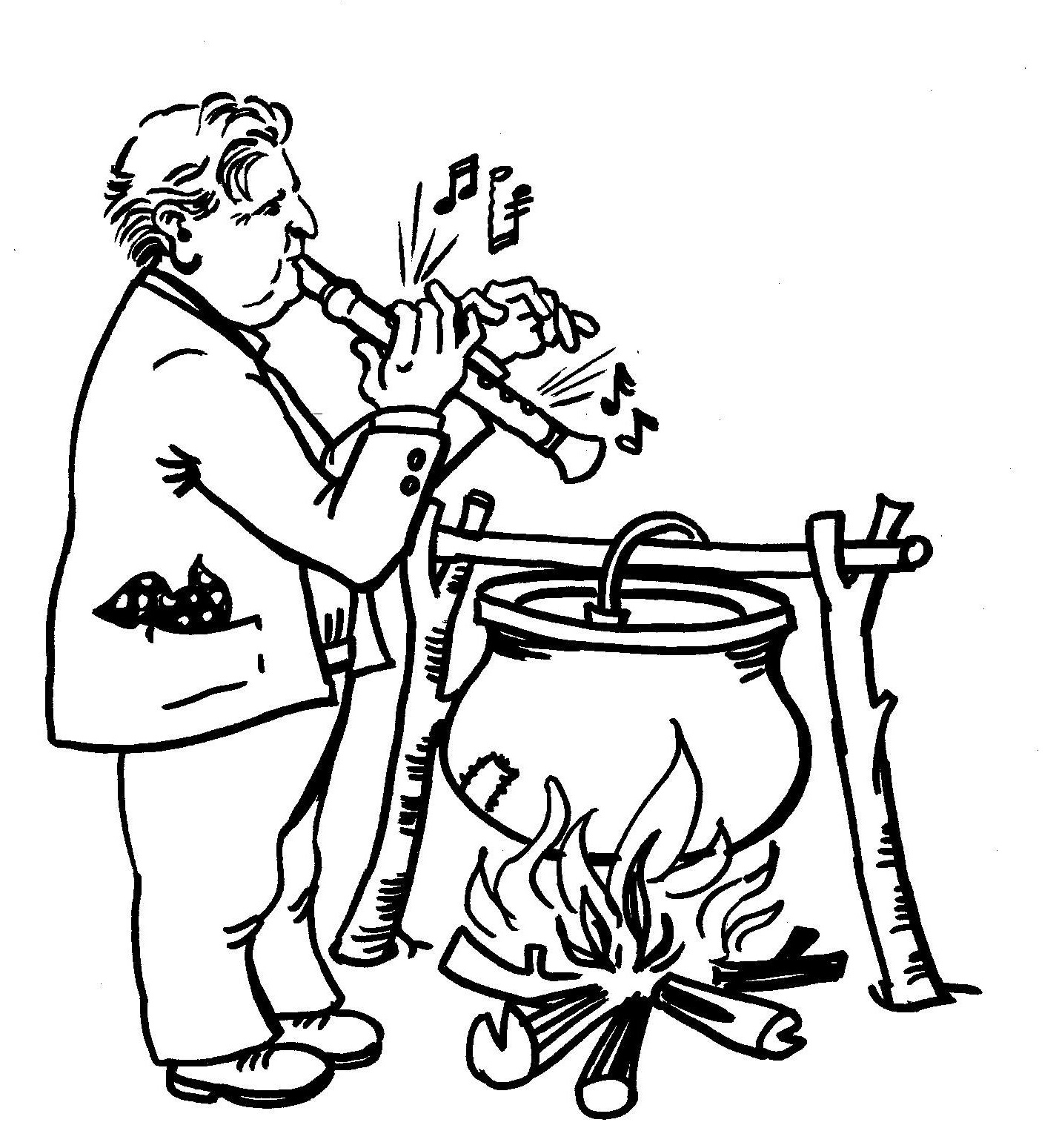
Sketch of Otto Höfler playing the flute like Orpheus

- Helmut Birkhan
- Robert Nedoma
- Rudolf Simek
- Herwig Wolfram
- Walter Steinhauser
- Franz Rolf Schröder
- Hans Kuhn (philologist)
- Werner Betz
- Kurt Schier
- Dietrich Kralik
- Friedrich Ranke
- Dennis Howard Green

== Sources ==
- Beck, Heinrich (2000). "Höfler". Reallexikon der Germanischen Altertumskunde (in German). Vol. 15. Walter de Gruyter. pp. 30–34. ISBN 3110166496.
- Behringer, Wolfgang (1998). "Das "Ahnenerbe" der Buchgesellschaft. Zum Neudruck einer Germanen-Edition des NS-Ideologen Otto Höfler". SoWi. Sozialwissenschaftliche Informationen. Das Journal für Geschichte, Politik, Wirtschaft und Kultur. 27 (4): 283–290.
- Birkhan, Helmut; Gschwantler, Otto, eds. (1968). Festschrift für Otto Höfler Zum 65. Geburtstag (in German). Verlag Notring.
- Birkhan, Helmut, ed. (1976). Festgabe für Otto Höfler zum 75. Geburtstag. Philologica Germanica (in German). Vol. 3. W. Braumüller. ISBN 3700301316.
- Birkhan, Helmut (13 November 2016). "Nachrufe auf Univ.-Prof. Dr. Otto Gschwantler". University of Vienna.
- Burrell, Courtney Marie (2023). Otto Höfler's Characterisation of the Germanic Peoples: From Sacred Men's Bands to Social Daemonism. de Gruyter. doi:10.1515/9783111032917. ISBN 978-3-11-103291-7.
- Hausmann, Frank-Rutger (2005). "The "Third Front": German Cultural Policy in Occupied Europe, 1940–1945". In Haar, Ingo; Fahlbusch, Michael (eds.). German Scholars and Ethnic Cleansing, 1920–1945. New York and Oxford: Berghahn Books. pp. 213–235. ISBN 1-57181-435-3.
- Hirschbiegel, Jan (1992). "Die 'germanische Kontinuitätstheorie' Otto Höflers". Zeitschrift der Gesellschaft für Schleswig-Holsteinische Geschichte. 117: 181–198.
- Klee, Ernst (2016). Personenlexikon zum Dritten Reich: Wer war was vor und nach 1945 (in German). Hamburg: Nikol Verlag. ISBN 978-3-86820-311-0.
- Lincoln, Bruce (1999). Theorizing Myth: Narrative, Ideology, and Scholarship. University of Chicago Press. ISBN 0226482022.
- Price, Neil (2019). The Viking Way: Magic and Mind in Late Iron Age Scandinavia. Oxbow Books. ISBN 978-1842172605.
- Rowe, Elizabeth Ashman (2005). "Germanic Religion: History of Study". In Jones, Lindsay (ed.). Encyclopedia of Religion. Vol. 5 (2 ed.). Macmillan Reference USA. pp. 3458–3461. ISBN 0-02-865997-X.
- Zernack, Julia (2018). "On the Concept of 'Germanic' Religion and Myth". In Clunies Ross, Margaret (ed.). The Pre-Christian Religions of the North: Research and Reception, Volume II: From c. 1830 to the Present. pp. 527–542.
