= Klaus Düwel =

German philologist (1935–2020)

- Born: 10 December 1935; Passau, Germany
- Died: 31 December 2020 (aged 85)
- Awards: Cross of the Order of Merit of the Federal Republic of Germany (2014)

Academic background
- Education: University of Göttingen
- Doctoral advisor: Wolfgang Lange
- Other advisors: Otto Höfler; Hans Neumann; Percy Ernst Schramm; Hermann Heimpel

Academic work
- Discipline: Germanic studies
- Institutions: University of Göttingen
- Main interests: Early Germanic literature; Germanic Antiquity; Germanic religion; Runology

Klaus Düwel (10 December 1935 – 31 December 2020) was a German philologist who specialized in Germanic studies. A professor at the University of Göttingen, he was recognized as one of the world's leading experts on Germanic Antiquity.

== Biography ==
Klaus Düwel was born in Hannover on 10 December 1935. Since 1956 he studied history and the German language at the University of Göttingen with the aim of becoming a teacher. Düwel transferred to the University of Tübingen in 1958, and to the University of Vienna in 1969. At Vienna, Düwel was strongly influenced by philologist Otto Höfler, who introduced him to the field of Germanic studies. Upon his return to Göttingen, Düwel studied Germanic philology under Wolfgang Lange and Hans Neumann, and medieval history under Percy Ernst Schramm and Hermann Heimpel. He also studied Protestant theology.

Düwel received his Ph.D. in 1965 under the supervision of Lange. With Lange, Düwel worked on the third revision of Rudolf Much's commentary on Germania. He completed his habilitation in 1972 with a thesis on Germanic religion. The preparation for his habilitation was funded with a grant from the Deutsche Forschungsgemeinschaft, which enabled him to conduct research in Scandinavia.

Following his habilitation, Düwel returned to the University of Göttingen, where he was appointed a professor in 1974. From 1978 to 2001, Düwel was a professor at the Seminator for German Philology at the University of Göttingen.

Düwel's research centered on Germanic Antiquity, particularly runology and the study of early Germanic literature. He was recognized as one of the world's leading authorities in this discipline. Düwel contributed a large number of articles to the second edition of Reallexikon der Germanischen Altertumskunde.

Düwel was a member of the Royal Gustavus Adolphus Academy, the Royal Norwegian Society of Sciences and Letters, the Norwegian Academy of Science and Letters, and a corresponding member of the Austrian Academy of Sciences. On 5 May 2014 he received the Cross of the Order of Merit of the Federal Republic of Germany.

== Selected works ==
- Werkbezeichnung der mittelhochdeutschen Erzähliteratur (1050-1250), 1965
- Runenkunde, 1983
- Werkbezeichnungen der mittelhochdeutschen Erzählliteratur (1050 - 1250), 1983
- (Editor) Der Reinhart Fuchs des Elsässers Heinrich / Heinrich [der Glîchezâre] 1985
- (Co-editor) Untersuchungen zu Handel und Verkehr der vor- und frühgeschichtlichen Zeit in Mittel- und Nordeuropa, 1985–1989
- Das Opferfest von Lade: quellenkritische Untersuchungen zur germanischen Religionsgeschichte, 1985
- (Editor) Runische Schriftkultur in kontinental-skandinavischer und -angelsächsischer Wechselbeziehung, 1994
- Schmuck und Waffen mit Inschriften aus dem ersten Jahrtausend, 1995
- (Editor) Runeninschriften als Quellen interdisziplinärer Forschung, 1998
- (Co-editor) Von Thorsberg nach Schleswig, 2001
- (With Rudolf Simek and John S. McKinnel) Runes, magic and religion, 2004
- Runica minora, 2015

== See also ==
- Wilhelm Heizmann
- Heinrich Beck (philologist)
- Rudolf Simek
- Robert Nedoma
- Kurt Schier
- François-Xavier Dillmann

== Sources ==
- Wilhelm Heizmann, Astrid van Nahl (2003), "Vorwort", in Wilhelm Heizmann, Astrid van Nahl (ed.), Runica – Germanica – Medievalia. Festschrift für Klaus Düwel., Reallexikon der Germanischen Altertumskunde - Ergänzungsbände (in German), vol. 37, Berlin/New York: de Gruyter, pp. vii–x, ISBN 9783110894073
  - Ebenda: Schriftenverzeichnis Klaus Düwel (1964–2002), S. 1008–1024.
- Kürschners Deutscher Gelehrten-Kalender 2015. Bio-bibliographisches Verzeichnis deutschsprachiger Wissenschaftler der Gegenwart (in German) (27. ed.), Berlin u. a.: de Gruyter, 2014, ISBN 978-3-11-033717-4
- "Nachruf auf Professor Dr. Klaus Düwel" (in German). University of Göttingen.
