= Sigrid Hunke =

German writer and SS personnel

Sigrid Hunke (26 April 1913 – 15 June 1999) was a German author and representative of a unitarian neopaganism. Hunke is regarded as a critic of Christianity while at the same time admiring Islam and Arabism and as a pioneer of the New Right. She is known for her work in the field of religious studies.

== Biography ==
Sigrid Hunke was born in Kiel, Germany, on 26 April 1913, the daughter of the publisher Heinrich Hunke (1879–1953) and Hildegard Lau (1879–1944). Her mother was the daughter of engineer Thies Peter Lau (1844–1933) and Walewska Berta Anna Artelt (1856–1943). She had two sisters, including Waltraud Hunke.

Sigrid Hunke received her PhD in religious studies from the Friedrich-Wilhelms-Universität Berlin in 1941. Her tutor was Ludwig Ferdinand Clauss, who later became associated with the ideology of the Neue Rechte. Hunke joined the "Germanischer Wissenschaftseinsatz", the German Sciences Service of the SS, the organization established by Heinrich Himmler to oversee the Germanization of Northern Europe. Her job was to research racial psychology. After 1957, she went to Morocco and stayed two years in Tangier (Tanja), after which she returned to Bonn. According to the historian Felix Wiedemann, Hunke was a pioneer for the religious concepts of right-wing intellectual circles of the "New Right". She had a major influence on Alain de Benoist and the French Nouvelle Droite. Hunke had an impact on part of the so-called "New Right" with her construction of an "allegedly pro-European paganism" and her "decidedly pro-Arab attitude." Hunke, as a new-right pioneer, claims that the Enlightenment is a non-European "foreign body" that must be fought. According to the psychologist Birgit Rommelspacher, Hunke is an influential theorist of the "New Right" with regard to the role of the "Nordic woman" in society. For the theologian Marie-Theres Wacker, Hunke was "the most prominent German-speaking representative of the New Right." Pierre Krebs, himself a pioneer of the "New Right" in Germany and founder of the Thule Seminar, emphasized the identity-political work of his colleague Hunke and called her a "magician of life, as a sacred keeper of identity, origin and heritage". Hunke was a pagan Unitarian. She was also known for her claims of Muslim influence over Western values. In her book, "Allahs Sonne über dem Abendland" (1960; "Allah's sun over the Occident") she asserts that "the influence exerted by the Arabs on the West was the first step in freeing Europe from Christianity." The scholar Sylvain Gouguenheim includes a lengthy description of her work in an appendix to his book Aristote au Mont-Saint-Michel under the heading “The Legacy of Sigrid Hunke”. He refers to her book on Islam and Europe, Allahs Sonne über dem Abendland, in this way: “This text, which extols the superiority of Islam over Christianity, is the work of a Nazi intellectual. At its origin lies the political commitment of the author, who joined the NSDAP (the German National Socialist Party) on May 1, 1937 and was an active member of the Berlin section of the National Socialist Student Association (Nationalsozialistischer Studentenbund) from 1938 onwards.”

== Awards and honors ==
- 1981: Kant Plaque (German Academy for Education and Culture in Munich, right-wing extremist)
- 1985: Schiller Prize of the Deutsches Kulturwerk Europäisches Geist (right-wing extremist)
- 1988: Egyptian Order Pour le Mérite for science and art.

== Works ==
- Training letter "Racial Psychology", 1935
- Origin and effect of foreign role models on the German people, dissertation Berlin 1941
- In the beginning there were man and woman. Role models and changes in gender relations, Hamm 1955
- Allah's sun over the West - Our Arabic heritage, Stuttgart 1960 (paperback edition: Fischer, Frankfurt am Main 2001, ISBN 3-596-15088-4)
- The Reich is dead - long live Europe. A European ethics, Hanover 1965
- Europe's other religion. Overcoming the Religious Crisis, Düsseldorf 1969
- The end of the discord. Diagnosis and therapy of a sick society, Bergisch Gladbach 1971
- The Post-Communist Manifesto. The dialectic unitarianism as an alternative, Stuttgart 1974
- Camels on the imperial mantle. German-Arab encounters since Charlemagne, Stuttgart 1976
- Belief and knowledge. The unity of European religion and science, Düsseldorf 1979
- Europe's own religion. The faith of the heretics, Bergisch Gladbach 1983
- Death - what is your meaning?, Pfullingen 1986
- From the fall of the West to the rise of Europe. Change of consciousness and future perspectives, Rosenheim 1989
- Allah is very different. Unveiling of 1001 prejudices about the Arabs, Bad König 1990

=== Allah's sun over the West ===
Dr. Sigrid Hunke, first published this book in German in 1963. It was afterwards translated into French, Turkish, Arabic, and Persian (Istanbul, 1972), Arabic (Cairo & Beirut, 1964), and French (Paris, 1963). (Tehran: 1981). The Culture of Islam in Europe is the title of its Persian translation. This is the main source for this book review.

The English translation of the original German title, Allahs Sonne über dem Abendland Unser Arabisches Erbe, is Allah's Sun over the Occident: Our Arabian Heritage. This book discusses the factors that have contributed to the expansion of Arab culture, and give a thorough description of what happened in Spain and Sicily, two regions of Europe that were governed by Muslims for centuries. She refers to the Spanish and Sicilian bridges that linked the East and West and mentions Frederick II as the person who brought the East and West together. in her argument that earlier Muslim advancements in these fields served as the basis for later scientific and technological achievements in Europe. She also discusses how other disciplines, such as art, music, and literature, grew in Europe in this book.
