= Ingvild Birkhan =

Austrian philosopher and germanist

Ingvild Birkhan née Bach (born 7 May 1940, Griffen, Carinthia) is an Austrian philosopher and women's studies researcher.

== Life ==
Ingvild Bach studied at the University of Vienna In 1965 she married Helmut Birkhan, with whom she has two daughters born in 1969 and 1974. In 1966, while still using her maiden name, she completed her doctorate with a dissertation on Die Voraussetzungen des Humors bei Wolfram von Eschenbach.

She resigned from her position as an assistant at the I. Philosophical Institute of the University of Vienna with the birth of her second daughter in favour of her children and a family member, However, she repeatedly gave university courses for foreign women during this time. In 1986, she resumed her academic work and was then a lecturer in women's studies and philosophy in Vienna. As a university lecturer for philosophy at the University of Vienna, she worked there in the initiative for strengthening women's studies and its anchoring in teaching. Among other things, she published in the journal L'Homme Z.F.G. From 1994 she was head of the inter-university coordination centre for women's studies in Vienna for many years.

== Works ==
- Ingvild Bach: Die Voraussetzungen des Humors bei Wolfram von Eschenbach. 1966 (Diss.).
- Ingvild Birkhan: Überlegungen zum Geschichtsbegriff und zu Foucaults „Archäologie“. In: Wiener Jahrbuch für Philosophie, Bd. 20, Wien 1988.
- Anette Baldauf; Ingvild Birkhan; Andrea Griesebner: Die Initiative für die Stärkung der Frauenforschung und ihrer Verankerung in der Lehre. In: L’Homme Z.F.G., 1. Jg/ 1 .H, 1990, S. 89–97.
- Ingvild Birkhan: Verändertes Ethos der Geschlechterbeziehung. In: Anton Grabner-Haider; Kurt Weinke (Hg.): Lebenswerte im Wandel. Graz 1990.
- Ingvild Birkhan; Mile Babić: Od "moći" dame ljubavi do nemoći idola žene. Zeitschrift Izraz, 3467, 2–3, 1990, S. 248–257.
- Das Wien der Jahrhundertwende. Eine Wende für oder gegen die Frauen? Überlegungen zu Weininger und Freud. In: Herta Nagl-Docekal; Herlinde Pauer-Studer (Hg.): Denken der Geschlechterdifferenz. Internationales Symposion, Wien 1990.
- Elisabeth Mixa; Elisabeth Malleier; Mariane Springer-Kremser; Ingvild Birkhan; et al.: Körper – Geschlecht – Geschichte. Historische und aktuelle Debatten in der Medizin. StudienVerlag, Innsbruck; Wien 1996.
- Ingvild Birkhan (Österreichische Gesellschaft für Hochschuldidaktik: Feministische Kontexte. Institutionen, Projekte, Debatten und der neue Frauenförderungsplan. StudienVerlag, Innsbruck 1995 (Zeitschrift für Hochschuldidaktik, Jg. 19, H. 2.).
- Gerda Fassel; Ingvild Birkhan; Heidi Pataki; Sigrid Weigel: Weibsbilder. Plastiken/Zeichnungen. Gesellschaft für Kunst und Volksbildung (Hrsg.), Wien 1996.
- Ingvild Birkhan (Koordinationsstelle für Frauenforschung und Frauenstudien Wien); Barbara Hey (Koordinationsstelle für Frauenforschung und Frauenstudien Graz): Innovationen. Standpunkte feministischer Forschung und Lehre. BMWV (Hrsg.),Print Media, 1999 (Materialien zur Förderung von Frauen in der Wissenschaft, Band 9).
- Ingrid Bennewitz; Ingvild Birkhan: Der Frauwen Buoch. Versuche zu einer feministischen Mediävistik. Kümmerle, Göppingen 1989 (Göppinger Arbeiten zur Germanistik; Nr. 517).
- Ingrid Bennewitz; Ingvild Birkhan: Lektüren der Differenz. Studien zur Mediävistik und Geschlechtergeschichte gewidmet Ingvild Birkhan. P. Lang, Bern; New York 2002.
