= Maatschappij der Nederlandse Letterkunde =

Dutch literary society

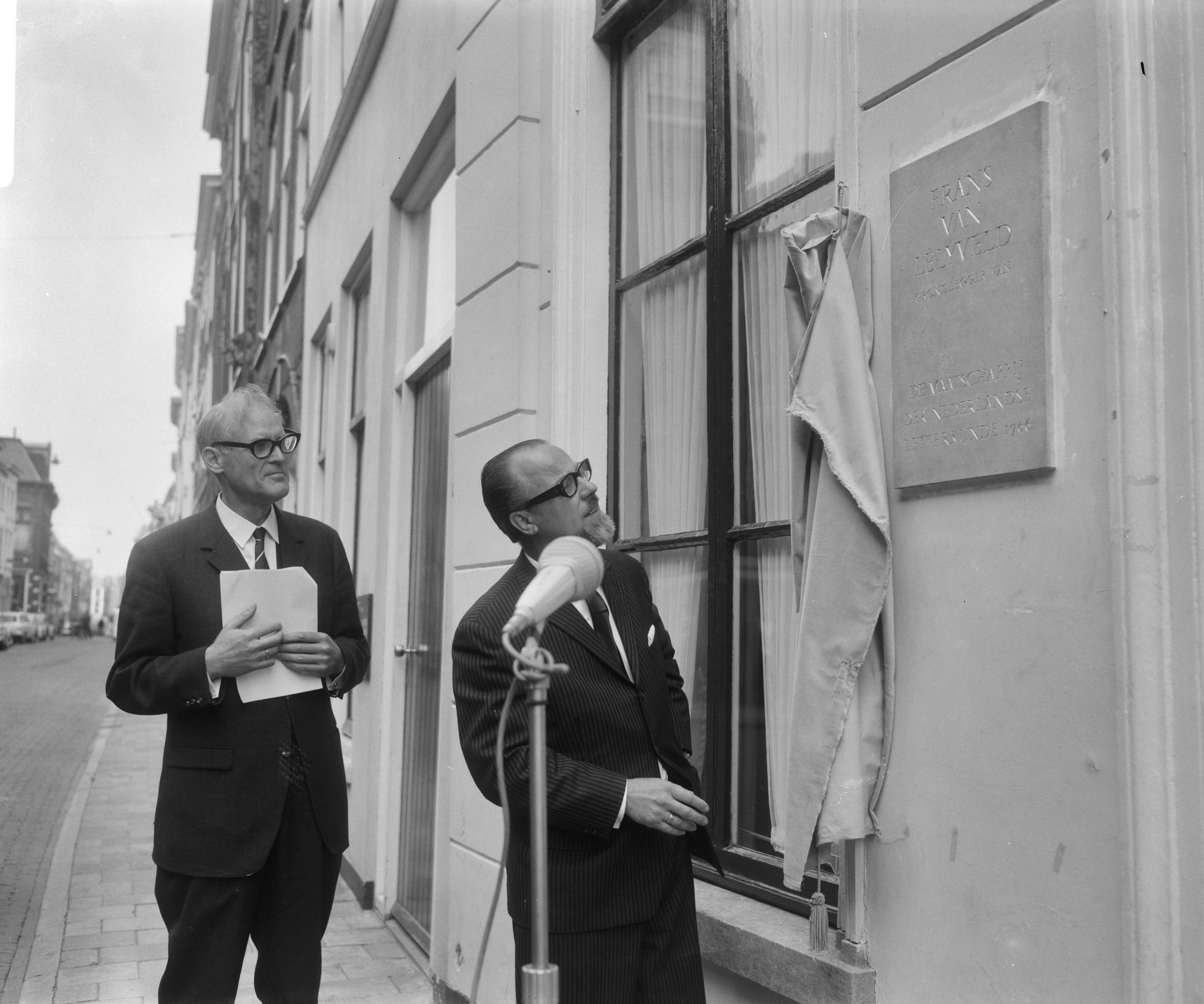
Memorial stone in Leiden (1966)

The Maatschappij der Nederlandse Letterkunde (Dutch pronunciation: [ˌmaːtsxɑˈpɛi dɛr ˈneːdərlɑntsə ˈlɛtərkʏndə], lit. 'Society of Dutch Literature', often abbreviated MNL) is an exclusive literary society. The MNL was established in Leiden in 1766 and is still located there. At the moment, the society has approximately 1,600 members, mainly (although not exclusively) Dutch scholars. New members can only be elected after they are introduced by existing members. The MNL has two regional branches, for the Northern and the Southern part of the Netherlands, and also a representative in South Africa. King Willem-Alexander is the patron of the MNL.

Activities of the MNL include organizing literary and scholarly events, publishing (or supporting the publication of) books and several journals, granting several awards, and maintaining its library.

The library of the MNL contains over a hundred thousand items, including thousands of unique letters and manuscripts, and the collections of several important Dutch literary figures. It has been located inside the Leiden University Library since October 1876.

The MNL has founded the Digitale Bibliotheek voor de Nederlandse Letteren (abbreviated DBNL), a digital database of thousands of primary and secondary sources and works of most Dutch writers, in 1999. The Digital Library is as of 2020 being maintained by a collaboration of the Taalunie, Flanders Heritage Library, and the Royal Library of the Netherlands.

To celebrate its 250th anniversary the MNL commissioned a history of the Maatschappij published in 2016 by Leiden University Press: Al die onbekende beroemdheden. 250 jaar Maatschappij der Nederlandse Letterkunde edited by Ton van Kalmthout, Peter Sigmond & Aleid Truijens. ISBN 9789087282585

== See also ==
- Koninklijke Hollandsche Maatschappij der Wetenschappen
- Royal Netherlands Academy of Arts and Sciences
- Dutch literature
- Books in the Netherlands
