= Wolfgang Krause =

German philologist (1895–1970)

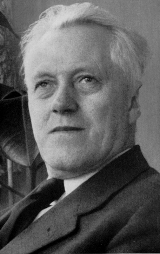
- Born: 18 September 1895; Steglitz, German Empire
- Died: 14 August 1970 (aged 74); Göttingen, West Germany

Academic background
- Education: University of Berlin; University of Göttingen
- Doctoral advisor: Eduard Hermann

Academic work
- Discipline: Linguistics
- Sub-discipline: Indo-European linguistics
- Institutions: University of Königsberg; University of Göttingen
- Main interests: Runology

Wolfgang Krause (18 September 1895 – 14 August 1970) was a German philologist and linguist. A professor at the University of Göttingen for many years, Krause specialized in comparative linguistics, and was an authority on Celtic studies, Tocharian languages, Germanic studies, Old Norse and particularly runology.

== Life and career ==
Wolfgang Krause was born in Steglitz, Germany, since 1920 part of Berlin, on 18 September 1895. Beginning in 1914, he studied classical philology and Indo-European at the University of Berlin under Ulrich von Wilamowitz-Moellendorff, Wilhelm Schulze, Julius Pokorny and Gustav Neckel, and at the University of Göttingen under Jacob Wackernagel and Eduard Hermann. At Göttingen, under Hermann's supervision, Krause completed his PhD in Indo-European in 1920, and his habilitation in Old Norse in 1923.

In 1928, Krause was appointed an associate professor at Göttingen. He was subsequently made Chair of Comparative Linguistics at the University of Königsberg. While at Göttingen, he became increasingly interested in runology.

Krause returned to Göttingen in 1937 to succeed Hermann as Chair of Indo-European Linguistics. In 1938, he was made Chair of Indo-European Studies and Runology and also succeeded Neckel as Director of the Department for Old Norse Philology. The same year he founded a separate Institut für Runenforschung (Institute for Runology) at the university. In 1938 he was elected a member of the Göttingen Academy of Sciences and Humanities.

In 1940, troubled by the dwindling resources for independent academic institutions in wartime, he placed the institute under the sponsorship of the SS cultural and educational organisation, the Ahnenerbe, and it became the Zentralstelle des Ahnenerbes für Runenforschung (Central Location of the Ahnenerbe for Runic Research), which distinguished it from a similar institute directed by Krause's rival Helmut Arntz. In 1943, he was made Director of the Runic Division of the Ahnenerbe; however, his institute was renamed the Lehr- und Forschungsstätte für Runen- und Sinnbildkunde (Teaching and Research Institute for Runic and Symbological Studies) and he was forced to accept as assistant director for Symbology Karl Theodor Weigel, whom he had long criticised as a dilettante, and who outranked him in the Ahnenerbe despite having never completed his doctorate. Krause never became a member of the Nazi party.

Krause remained in his position after World War II. In 1950, his Department for Nordic Philology was combined with his Institute for Runic Studies to form a Scandinavian Seminar under his leadership. In 1963, he retired as Professor Emeritus, after which the directorship of the two departments was again divided. A Festschrift was published in his honor on his 65th birthday, and on his 70th birthday, students at the University of Göttingen honoured him with a torchlight procession. He died in Göttingen on 14 August 1970.

For more than thirty years, Krause had been one of the most influential personalities at the University of Göttingen, not only because of his scientific achievements, but also because of his abilities as an educator. He was known for his ability to present complicated problems in a clear manner. A large number of students earned their PhDs and habilitations under his supervision, and many went on to become prominent scholars in the field of Old Norse studies. His research on runology formed an important basis for the field of modern runology and Germanic studies.

== Personal life ==
Krause had an eye ailment from early childhood. During the 1930s, his sight deteriorated considerably, and in the postwar years he became completely blind. He used Braille texts and in deciphering runic inscriptions was assisted by his wife, Agnes. Students of his such as Hertha Marquardt also received stipends to assist him.

== Selected publications ==
- Die Wortstellung in den zweigliedrigen Wortverbindungen. Dissertation, Göttingen 1920
- Die Frau in der Sprache der altisländischen Familiengeschichte. Habilitation thesis, 1923
- Die Kelten. Tübingen 1929
- Was man in Runen ritzte. Halle 1935
- Runeninschriften im älteren Futhark. Halle 1937, rev. ed. Göttingen 1966
- Das irische Volk: Seine rassischen und kulturellen Grundlagen. Göttingen 1940
- Westtocharische Grammatik. Heidelberg 1952
- Handbuch des Gotischen. Munich 1953, 3rd ed. 1968
- Tocharisches Elementarbuch volume 1, Grammatik. Heidelberg 1960
- "Zum Namen des Lachses". In Nachrichten der Akademie der Wissenschaften in Göttingen, philologisch-historische Klasse, Göttingen 1961, pp. 83–89
- Runen. Berlin 1970
- Die Sprache der urnordischen Runeninschriften. Heidelberg 1971

== Sources ==
- Düwel, Klaus [in German] (2000). "Krause". In Beck, Heinrich; Geuenich, Dieter; Steuer, Heiko (eds.). Reallexikon der Germanischen Altertumskunde (in German). Vol. 17. Walter de Gruyter. pp. 320–324. ISBN 3110166496.
- Indogermanica: Festschrift für Wolfgang Krause: Zum 65. Geburtstage am 18. September 1960 von Fachgenossen und Freunden dargebracht. Heidelberg: Winter, 1960. OCLC 5664269
- Hunger, Ulrich (1984). Die Runenkunde im Dritten Reich: Ein Beitrag zur Wissenschafts- und Ideologiegeschichte des Nationalsozialismus. Frankfurt: Lang. ISBN 3-8204-8072-2.
- Paul, Fritz [in German] (1985). "Zur Geschichte der Skandinavistik an der Georg-August-Universität Göttingen Eine vorläufige Skizze (1985)". University of Göttingen (in German).
