= Rudolf Simek =

Austrian philologist and religious studies scholar

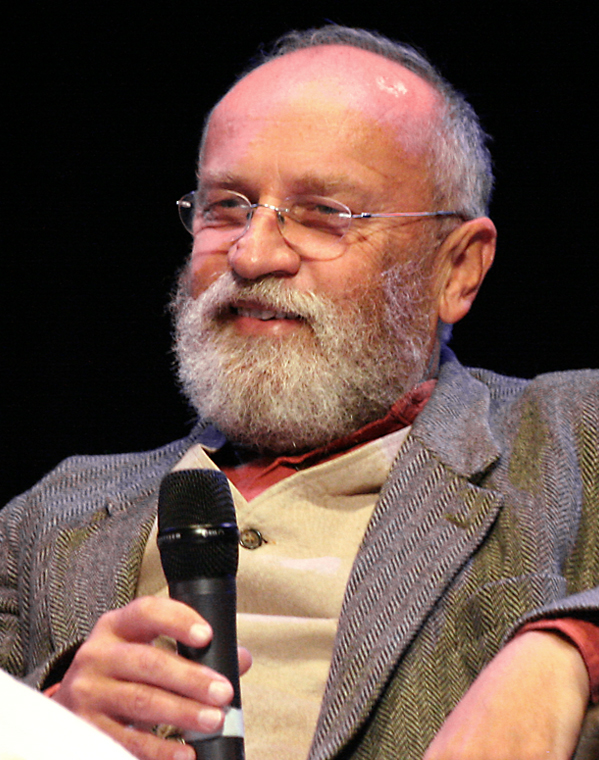
- Photographed in October 2012
- Born: 21 February 1954 (age 72); Eisenstadt, Austria

Academic background
- Education: University of Vienna
- Academic advisors: Otto Gschwantler; Helmut Birkhan

Academic work
- Discipline: Germanic studies
- Institutions: University of Bonn
- Main interests: Germanic religion and mythology; Medieval science and popular religion; Old Norse literature; Old Norse religion and mythology; Vikings and the Viking Age
- Notable works: Dictionary of Northern Mythology (1993)

Rudolf Simek (born 21 February 1954) is an Austrian philologist and religious studies scholar who is Professor and Chair of Ancient German and Nordic Studies at the University of Bonn. Simek specializes in Germanic studies, and is the author of several notable works on Germanic religion and mythology (including Old Norse religion and mythology), Germanic peoples, Vikings, Old Norse literature, and the culture of Medieval Europe.

== Biography ==
Since 1995, Simek has been Professor and Chair of Ancient German and Nordic Studies at the University of Bonn. Simek was appointed Professor of Comparative Religion at the University of Tromsø in 1999, and Professor of Old Nordic Studies at the University of Sydney in 2000. Simek has held a number of visiting professorships, having had long research stays at the universities of Reykjavik, Copenhagen, London, Oxford and Sydney. From 2000 to 2003, Simek was Chairman of the International Saga Society (German: Internationale Saga-Gesellschaft). Simek is a member of many additional learned societies, including the International Arthurian Society, the Österreichische Gesellschaft für Germanistik, the Viking Society for Northern Research, the Society for Northern Studies, and the Royal Gustavus Adolphus Academy.

== Research ==
Simek researches a wide variety of topics connected to the Middle Ages. This includes Germanic religion and mythology (including Old Norse religion and mythology), Vikings and the Viking Age, Old Norse literature, and medieval science (including astronomy) and popular religion. Simek has published a number of notable works on these subjects, several of which have been translated into multiple languages.

== Selected works ==
- Lexikon der germanischen Mythologie, Stuttgart, Kröner, 1984 ISBN 3-520-36801-3 (translations to English, French and Icelandic)
- Lexikon der altnordischen Literatur (with Hermann Pálsson), Stuttgart, Kröner, 1987 ISBN 3-520-49001-3
- Altnordische Kosmographie. Studien und Quellen zu Weltbild und Weltbeschreibung in Norwegen und Island vom 12. bis zum 14. Jahrhundert, Berlin/New York, de Gruyter, 1990 (Reallexikon der germanischen Altertumskunde. Ergänzungsbände, Bd. 4) ISBN 3-11-012181-6
- Erde und Kosmos im Mittelalter. München, C.H. Beck, 1992. ISBN 3-406-35863-2
- Die Wikinger, München, C.H. Beck, 1998 ISBN 3-406-41881-3 (translation to Spanish)
- Religion und Mythologie der Germanen, Stuttgart, Theiss 2003 ISBN 3-8062-1821-8
- Götter und Kulte der Germanen, München, C.H. Beck, 2004 ISBN 3-406-50835-9
- Runes, Magic and Religion: A Sourcebook (with John McKinnell und Klaus Düwel), Wien, Fassbaender, 2004 ISBN 978-3-900538-81-1
- Mittelerde – Tolkien und die germanische Mythologie, München, C.H. Beck, 2005 ISBN 3-406-52837-6
- Der Glaube der Germanen, Limburg und Kevelaer, Lahn-Verlag, 2005 ISBN 3-7867-8495-7
- Die Germanen, Stuttgart, Reclam, 2006. ISBN 3-15-017051-6
- Die Edda. C. H. Beck, München 2007, ISBN 978-3-406-56084-2 (C. H. Beck Wissen).
- Ewige Orte. Reliquien und heiligen Stätten in Wien. Metro, Wien 2007, ISBN 978-3-902517-64-7.
- Artus-Lexikon. Mythos und Geschichte, Werke und Personen der europäischen Artusdichtung. Reclam, Stuttgart 2012, ISBN 978-3-15-010858-1.
- Die Schiffe der Wikinger. Reclam, Stuttgart 2014, ISBN 978-3-15-010999-1.
- Monster im Mittelalter. Die phantastische Welt der Wundervölker und Fabelwesen. Böhlau, Köln, Weimar, Wien 2015. ISBN 978-3-412-21111-0.
- Vinland! Wie die Wikinger Amerika entdeckten. C. H. Beck, München 2016, ISBN 978-3-406-69720-3.
- Trolle. Ihre Geschichte von der Mythologie bis zum Internet. Böhlau, Köln/Weimar/Wien 2018, ISBN 978-3-412-50743-5.
- Die Geschichte der Normannen. Von Wikingerhäuptlingen zu Königen Siziliens. Reclam, Ditzingen 2018, ISBN 978-3-15-011174-1.
- Monster im Mittelalter. Köln und Wien: Böhlau 2019, ISBN 978-3412514037

== See also ==
- Hilda Ellis Davidson – English folklorist (1914–2006)
- Georges Dumézil – French philologist and historian (1898–1986)
- John Lindow – American philologist (born 1946)
- Robert Nedoma – Austrian philologist (born 1961)
- Andy Orchard – British academic (born 1964)
- Edgar C. Polomé – Belgian-American scholar (1920–2000)
- Gabriel Turville-Petre – English philologist
- Jan de Vries (philologist) – Dutch philologist (1890–1964)
