= Germanic philology =

Philology study of Germanic languages

Germanic philology or Germanic studies is the philological study of the Germanic languages, particularly from a comparative or historical perspective.

== History ==
=== 16th–17th centuries ===
The beginnings of research into the Germanic languages began in the 16th century, with the discovery of literary texts in the earlier phases of the languages. Early modern publications dealing with Old Norse culture appeared in the 16th century, e.g. Historia de gentibus septentrionalibus (Olaus Magnus, 1555) and the editio princeps of the 13th century Gesta Danorum by Saxo Grammaticus, in 1514.

In 1603, Melchior Goldast made the first edition of Middle High German poetry, Tyrol and Winsbeck, including a commentary which focused on linguistic problems and set the tone for the approach to such works in the subsequent centuries.

He later gave similar attention to the Old High German translation of the Benedictine Rule. In Elizabethan era and Jacobean England, Robert Cotton's collection and studies of the manuscripts now in the Cotton Library marks the beginnings of scholarship of the Old English language and Anglo-Saxon literature.

The pace of publications started by the Gutenberg Revolution increased during the 17th century with Latin translations of the Edda (notably Peder Resen's Edda Islandorum of 1665).

=== 19th and 20th centuries ===
Germanic philology, together with linguistics as a whole, emerged as a formal academic discipline in the early 19th century, pioneered particularly in Germany by linguists such as Jacob Grimm, the German author, philologist, and folklorist who discovered the Grimm's law, documenting the sound shift across all Germanic languages. Important 19th-century scholars include Henry Sweet, Matthias Lexer, and Joseph Wright. One of the most famous and respected 20th-century scholars, whose work as a Germanic philologist heavily influenced his poetry, fiction, and high fantasy writing, was Oxford University professor J.R.R. Tolkien.

== Subfields ==
- Comparative linguistics (Common Germanic)
- Dutch studies
- English studies
- German studies
- Germanic languages
- Runology
- Scandinavian studies

== See also ==
- Germanic peoples
- The Journal of Comparative Germanic Linguistics
