= Early Germanic culture =

Early culture of the Germanic peoples

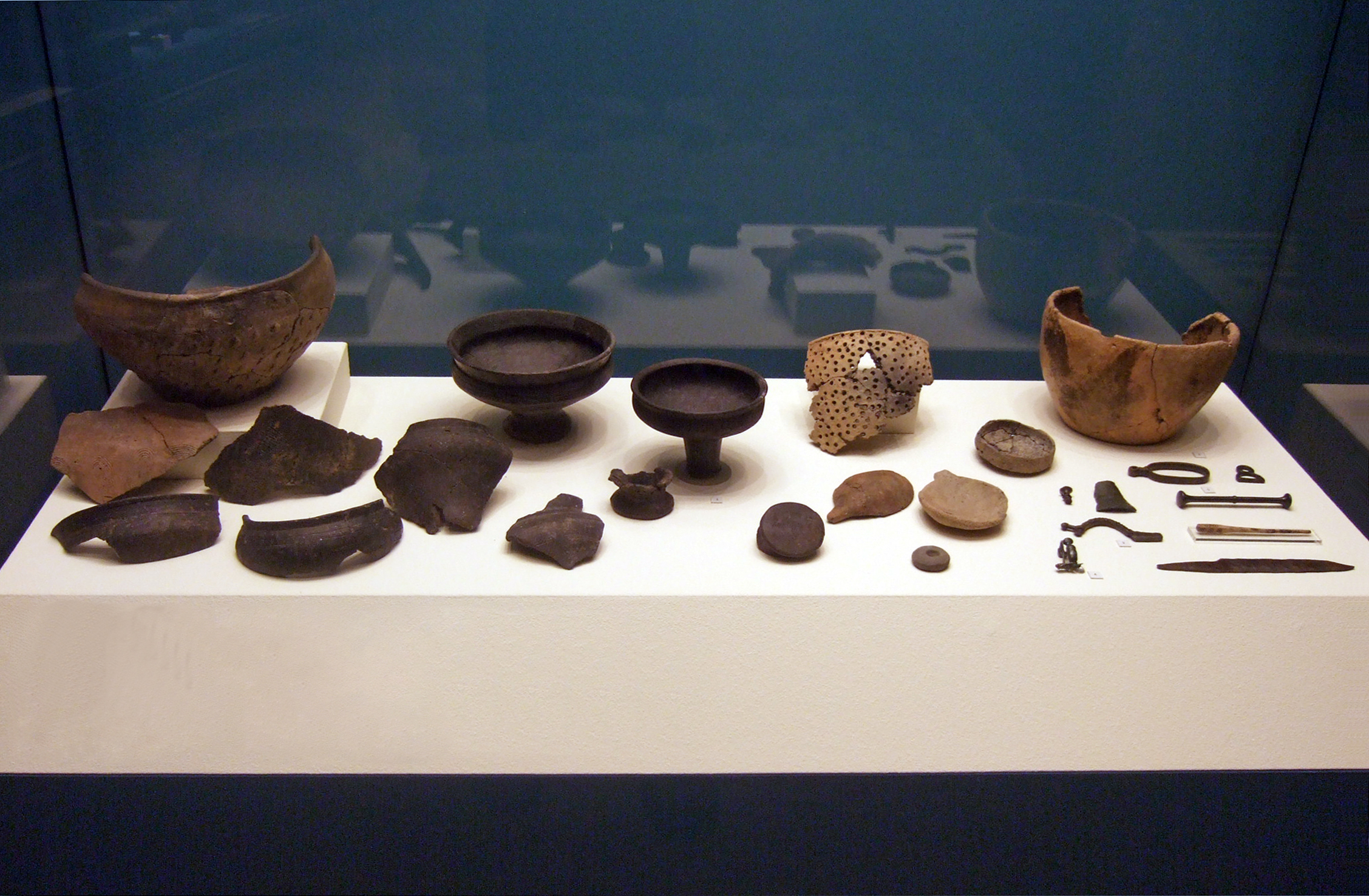
Grave goods from the settlement area of the Elbe Germanic peoples near Biesdorf, 9th century BCE to 2nd century CE

Early Germanic culture is the name given to describe the lifestyle of the early Germanic peoples. Researchers trace a distinctive Germanic identity as far back as the 6th-century BCE Jastorf culture located along the central part of the Elbe River in present-day central Germany. From there Germanic influence spread north to the ocean, east to the Vistula River, west to the Rhine River, and south to the Danube River. It came under significant external influence during the Migration Period, particularly from ancient Rome.

Germanic society was patriarchal. Roman sources described how the Lombard men owned their women, and how all women not beholden to a man were owned by a king. The Germanic peoples spoke mutually intelligible dialects, some of which developed in to modern times.

Germanic peoples eventually overwhelmed the Western Roman Empire. In the Middle Ages Greco-Roman and Irish influences gradually converted them from paganism to Christianity, and they abandoned their tribal way of life. Certain traces of early Germanic culture have survived among the Germanic peoples up to the present day.

== Languages ==
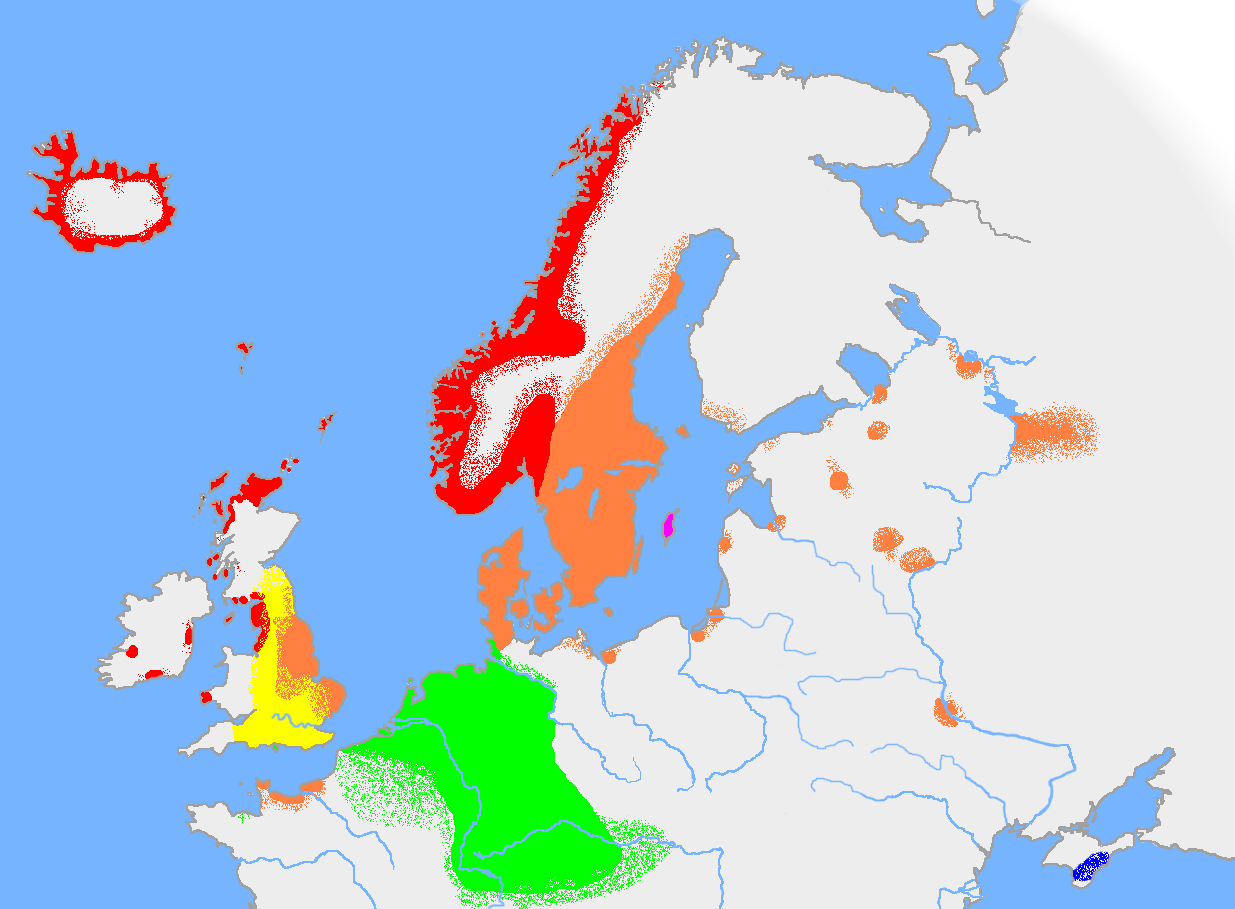
The approximate extent of Germanic languages in northern Europe in the early 10th century: Old West Norse Old East Norse Old Gutnish Old English Continental West Germanic (Old Frisian, Old Saxon, Old Dutch, Old High German). Crimean Gothic (East Germanic)

Linguists postulate that an early Proto-Germanic language existed and was distinguishable from the other Indo-European languages as far back as 500 BCE.

From what is known, the early Germanic tribes may have spoken mutually intelligible dialects derived from a common parent language but there are no written records to verify this fact.

The Germanic tribes moved and interacted over the next centuries, and separate dialects among Germanic languages developed down to the present day. Some groups, such as the Suebi, have a continuous recorded existence, and so there is a reasonable confidence that their modern dialects can be traced back to those in classical times.

By extension, but sometimes controversially, the names of the sons of Mannus, Istvaeones, Irminones, and Ingvaeones, are sometimes used to divide up the medieval and modern West Germanic languages. The more easterly groups such as the Vandals are thought to have been united in the use of East Germanic languages, the most famous of which is Gothic. The dialect of the Germanic people who migrated to Scandinavia is not generally called Ingvaeonic, but is classified as North Germanic, which developed into Old Norse. Within the West Germanic group, linguists associate the Suebian or Hermionic group with an "Elbe Germanic" which developed into Upper German, including modern German. More speculatively, given the lack of any such clear explanation in any classical source, modern linguists sometimes designate the Frankish language (and its descendant Dutch) as Istvaeonic, although the geographical term "Weser–Rhine Germanic" is often preferred. However, the classical "Germani" near the Rhine, to whom the term was originally applied by Caesar, may not have even spoken Germanic languages, let alone a language recognizably ancestral to modern Dutch. The close relatives of Low German, English and Frisian, are sometimes designated as Ingvaeonic, or alternatively, "North Sea Germanic". Frankish, (and later Dutch, Luxembourgish and the Frankish dialects of German in Germany) has continuously been intelligible to some extent with both "Ingvaeonic" Low German, and some "Suebian" High German dialects, with which they form a spectrum of continental dialects. All these dialects or languages appear to have formed by the mixing of migrating peoples after the time of Julius Caesar. So it is not clear if these medieval dialect divisions correspond to any mentioned by Tacitus and Pliny.

Despite their common linguistic framework, by the 5th century CE, the Germanic peoples were linguistically differentiated and could no longer easily comprehend one another. Nonetheless, the line between Germanic and Romance peoples in central Europe remained at the western mouth of the Rhine river and while Gaul fell under Germanic domination and was firmly settled by the Franks, the linguistic patterns did not move much. Further west and south in Europe-proper, the linguistic presence of the Germanic languages is almost negligible. Despite the fact that the Visigoths ruled a kingdom in what is now Spain and Portugal for upwards of 250 years, there are almost no recognizable Gothic words borrowed into Spanish or Portuguese. Conversely, many common given names in the Iberian peninsula, and the surnames derived from them, are of Germanic origin (Álvaro – Álvarez; Fernando – Fernández/Hernández; Gonzalo – González; Rodrigo – Rodríguez, etc.).

By 500 CE, the West Germanic speakers had apparently developed a distinct language continuum with extensive loaning from Latin (due to their ongoing contact with the Romans), whereas the East Germanic languages were dying out. (Note: Of the Germanic languages, the only well-attested East Germanic language is Gothic.)

== Literature ==
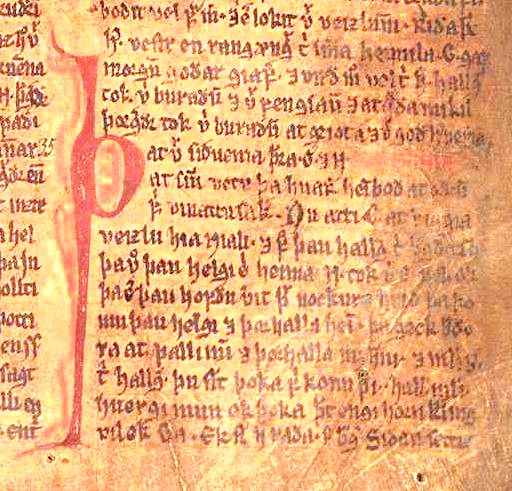
Excerpt from Njáls saga in the Möðruvallabók (AM 132 folio 13r), c. 1350

Germanic literature includes all the oral and written literature which was common to the early Germanic peoples, in respect to form and nature of content. It was generally intended to honor the gods or to praise tribal ancestors.

The general public plays an insignificant role in Germanic literature, which revolves almost exclusively around chieftains, warriors and their associates. Wives and other female relatives of such leaders and warriors figure prominently in many pieces of Germanic literature.

Germanic literature is divided into literature transferred orally from generation to generation and literature written down at a later date. Some of this literature, such as the Grottasöngr, appears to have been passed down from a very early time.

Much of what is known about Germanic literature was passed down by skalds and scops, who were poets employed by a chieftain to memorize his deeds and those of his ancestors. Priscus notes that such skalds were also prominent at the court of Attila.

The structure of the verse and the rime system shows that Germanic poetry followed a distinct poetic form. A significant characteristic is the alliterative verse.

Riddles figure prominently in both Anglo-Saxon and early Scandinavian literature.

Important works are Germanic literature are Beowulf, the Nibelungenlied, and the Icelandic Eddas and sagas.

Powerful individuals of the distant past figure prominently in Germanic literature. Such individuals include Julius Caesar, Attila, Ermanaric, Theodoric the Great and Charlemagne. Accounts of the history of the Goths play and important role in Germanic literature, and although the Goths themselves disappeared, their deeds were remembered for centuries afterwards among Germanic peoples living as far as Iceland.

The works of Jordanes, Gregory of Tours, Paul the Deacon, Priscus and Saxo Grammaticus were written in Latin and Greek, but since their authors were of Germanic origin and because their works show traces of Germanic heritage, philologist Francis Owen considers these works part of Germanic literature as well.

A large amount of Germanic epic literature must have been produced during the violent years of the Migration Period, but few of these accounts appear to have been preserved.

During his reign, Charlemagne ordered a collection of the old heroic songs to be made, but this collection was later destroyed by order of Louis the Pious.

A common theme in Germanic literature is the consequences of failing to live up to one's moral principles, and the moral dilemma faced by an individual struggling to maintain his loyalty under difficult conditions. A key theme is the attempt of the individual to overcome his fate, referred to as wyrd by the Anglo-Saxons. In Germanic literature, dark humor figures prominently.

== Scripts ==
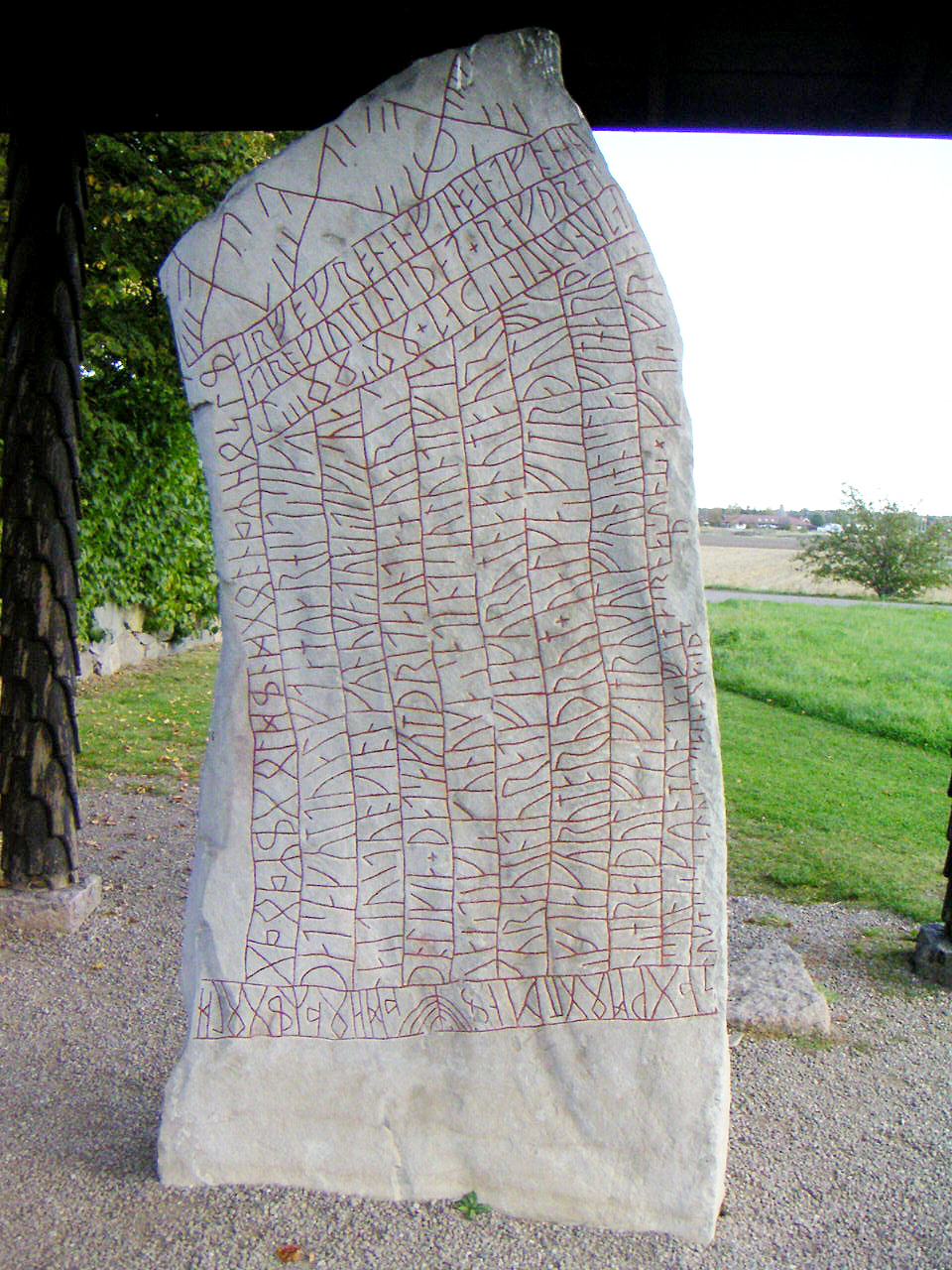
An inscription using cipher runes, the Elder Futhark, and the Younger Futhark, on the 9th-century Rök runestone in Sweden

The earliest known Germanic inscription was found at Negau (in what is now southern Austria) on a bronze helmet dating back to the first century BCE.

Some of the other earliest known physical records of the Germanic language appear on stone and wood carvings in Runic script from around 200 CE.

Runes had a special significance in early Germanic culture, and each runic letter had a distinct name associated with a particular subject. The origins of runes has been a source of controversy.

Runic writing likely disappeared due to the concerted opposition of the Christian Church, which regarded runic text as heathen symbols which supposedly contained inherent magical properties that they associated with the Germanic peoples' pagan past. Unfortunately, this primitive view ignores the abundance of "pious runic writing found on church-related objects" (ranging from inscriptions in the doorways of churches, on church bells and even those found on baptismal fonts) when Christianity was introduced into the Germanic North. As late as the 10th century there is evidence of runic writing on a stone monument erected by the first Christian king of Denmark, Harald Bluetooth. In the text, Harald honors his parents using runic script and on the other side of the stone is a depiction of 'Christ in His Glory', incorporating a runic inscription which extolls Harald for acquiring Denmark and Norway and for converting the Danes into Christians.

An important linguistic step was made by the Christian convert Ulfilas, who became a bishop to the Thervingi Goths in CE 341; he subsequently invented a Gothic alphabet and translated the scriptures from Greek into Gothic, creating a Gothic Bible, which is the earliest known translation of the Bible into a Germanic language.

== Religion ==
Prior to the Middle Ages, Germanic peoples followed what is now referred to as Germanic paganism: "a system of interlocking and closely interrelated religious worldviews and practices rather than as one indivisible religion" and as such consisted of "individual worshippers, family traditions and regional cults within a broadly consistent framework".

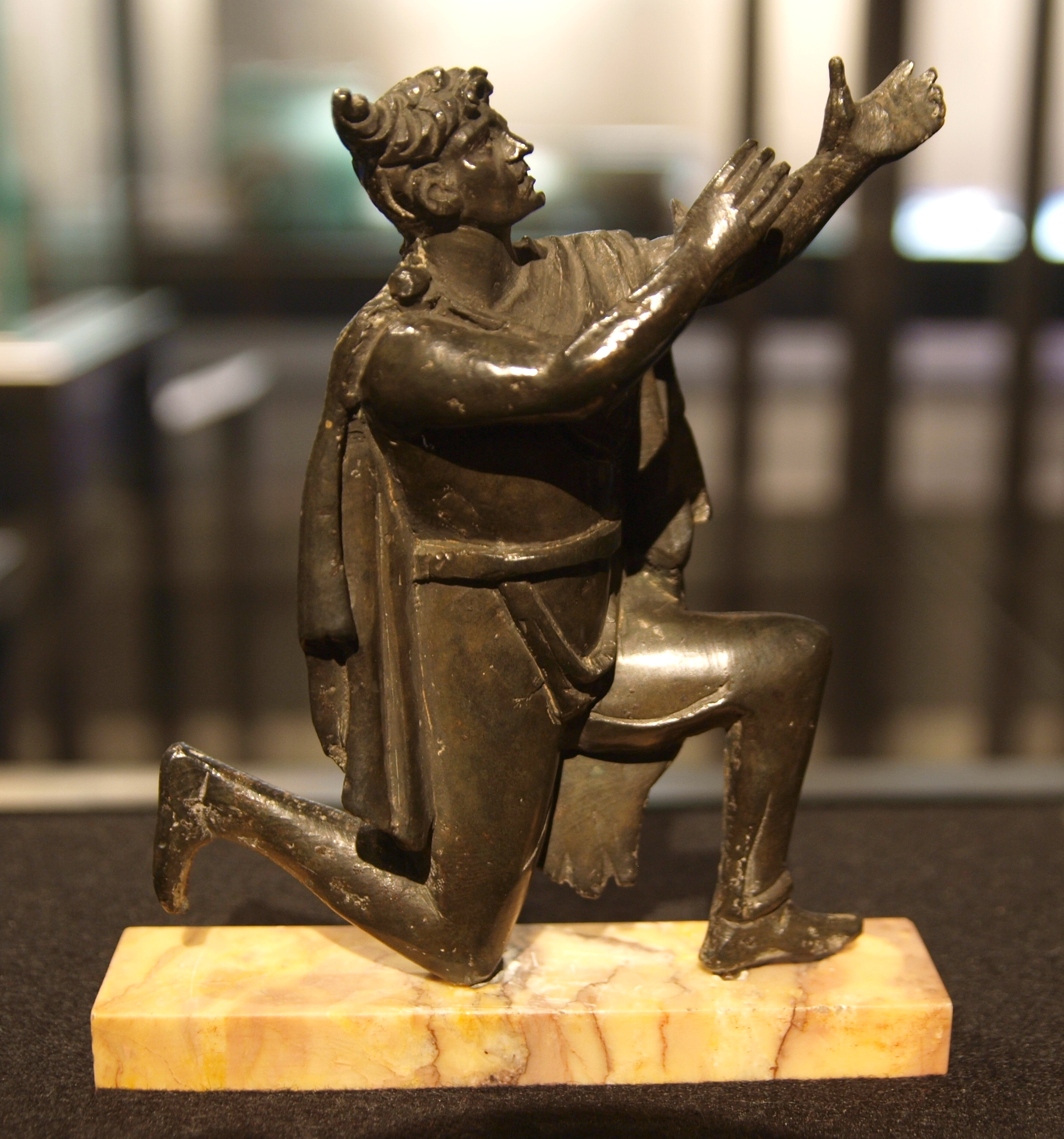
Roman bronze statuette dated to the late 1st century – early 2nd century CE, representing a Germanic man praying

Germanic religion was polytheistic in nature, with some underlying similarities to other European and Indo-European religions. Despite the unique practices of some tribes, there was a degree of cultural uniformity among the Germanic peoples concerning religion. (Note: Many groups of Germanic peoples shared one form or another of a creation story where a divine being emerges from nothingness only to be sacrificed and torn to pieces; the bones of this divine creature (named Ymir) produced the rocks, his flesh became the earth, his blood formed the seas, the clouds emerged from his hair, and his skull made up the sky. In this creation story, a mighty tree called Yggdrasill is situated at the center of the earth, its top touching the sky, its branches covering the earth, and the great tree's roots plunging into hell. Connecting the three planes of "Heaven, Earth, and Hades", this "Universal Tree" symbolized the universe itself.)

From its earliest descriptions by Roman authors in antiquity to the Icelandic accounts written in the Middle Ages, Germanic religion appears to have changed considerably.

=== Deities ===
Many of the deities found in Germanic paganism appeared under similar names across the Germanic peoples, most notably the god known to the Germans as Wodan or Wōden, to the Anglo-Saxons as Woden, and to the Norse as Óðinn, as well as the god Thor – known to the Germans as Donar, to the Anglo-Saxons as Þunor and to the Norse as Þórr.

Tacitus writes that the Germanic peoples primarily worshipped "Mercury", but also "Hercules" and "Mars". These have generally been identified with Odin, Thor and Týr, the gods of wisdom, thunder and war respectively.

=== Rituals ===
Archaeological findings suggest that the early Germanic peoples practiced some of the same 'spiritual' rituals as the Celts, including human sacrifice, divination, and the belief in spiritual connection with the natural environment around them.

In Germanic religion, one distinguishes between household worship and community worship. This was similar to religious worship in Roman religion. In household worship the male head of the household would act as the "priest".

Spiritual rituals frequently occurred in consecrated groves or upon islands on lakes where perpetual fires burned. The Germanic peoples did not construct temples to carry out their religious rites.

=== Priests ===
Unlike the Celts, who had their druids, there does not appear to have been a priestly caste among the Germanic peoples. There were however individuals who performed certain religious duties. This included carrying out sacrifices and punishing those found guilty of crimes against the tribe.

Germanic priestesses were feared by the Romans; according to Plutarch, these tall women with glaring eyes, wearing flowing white gowns often wielded a knife for sacrificial offerings. Captives might have their throats cut and be bled into giant cauldrons or have their intestines opened up and the entrails thrown to the ground for prophetic readings.

=== Afterlife ===
Germanic ideology and religious practices were pervaded and colored to a large degree by war, particularly the notion of a heroic death on the battlefield, as this brought the god(s) a "blood sacrifice." (Note: The principle shared deity among the Germanic tribes, Odin-Wodan, (in varying name forms) was not only the god of war, but of the dead as well. Odin protected great heroes in combat but often killed his "protégés", who were led to him by the Valkyries and gathered together at Valhalla to practice fighting in preparation for the final eschatological battle of the Ragnarök.)

=== Conversion to Christianity ===
Germanic peoples were largely ignorant of the Christian religion until their contact with Rome.

Pagan beliefs amid the Germanic tribes were reported by some of the earlier Roman historians and in the 6th century CE another instance of this appears when the Byzantine historian and poet, Agathias, remarked that the Alemannic religion was "solidly and unsophisticatedly pagan."

The Ostrogoths, Visigoths, and Vandals were Christianized while they were still outside the bounds of the Empire; however, they converted to Arianism rather than Roman Catholicism, and were soon regarded as heretics by Catholics. The one great written remnant of the Gothic language is the Gothic Bible made by Wulfila, the Arian missionary who converted them. Goths, Vandals, and other Germanic peoples often offered political resistance prior to their conversion to Christianity. The Lombards were not converted until after their entrance into the Empire, but received Christianity from Arian Germanic tribes sometime during the 5th century.

The Franks were converted directly from paganism to Catholicism under the leadership of Clovis I in about CE 496 without an intervening time as Arians. The Visigoths converted to Roman Catholicism in 589 AD. Several centuries later, Anglo-Saxon and Frankish missionaries and warriors undertook the conversion of their Saxon neighbors. A key event was the felling of Thor's Oak near Fritzlar by Boniface, apostle of the Germans, in CE 723. When Thor failed to strike Boniface dead after the oak hit the ground, the Franks were amazed and began their conversion to the Christian faith.

Eventually for many Germanic tribes, the conversion to Christianity was achieved by armed force, successfully completed by Charlemagne, in a series of campaigns (the Saxon Wars), that also brought Saxon lands into the Frankish empire. Massacres, such as at Verden, where as many as 4,500 people were beheaded according to one of Charlemagne's chroniclers, were a direct result of this policy.

In Scandinavia, Germanic paganism continued to dominate until the 11th century in the form of Old Norse religion, when it was gradually replaced by Christianity.

== Folklore ==
The folklore of early Germanic peoples was intimately intertwined with their natural surroundings. Legendary creatures of Germanic folklore include elves, who inhabited the woods, foundations and streams; dwarves, who inhabited the caves of the earth; serpents, who inhabited the sea; and the neck, who inhabited the marshes.

Remnants of early Germanic folklore has survived unto the present day.

== Festivals ==
Festivals in early Germanic culture included the autumn festival (Winter Nights), the New Year festival (Yule), the spring festival (Easter), and Midsummer's Day.

Yule was intended to induce the sun to regain its former strength. Easter celebrated the renewal of nature. The Midsummer's Day was the greatest festival of all, in which it was celebrated that the sun had regained its full power. On this occasion numerous tribes would come together to celebrate and a general peace would sometimes be declared. Meanwhile, the autumn festival was a period of mourning.

== Calendar ==
The early Germanic calendars were the regional calendars used among the Germanic peoples before they adopted the Julian calendar in the Early Middle Ages. The calendars were an element of early Germanic culture. The Germanic peoples had names for the months that varied by region and dialect, but they were later replaced with local adaptations of the Julian month names. Records of Old English and Old High German month names date to the 8th and 9th centuries, respectively. Old Norse month names are attested from the 13th century. As with most pre-modern calendars, the reckoning used in early Germanic culture was likely lunisolar. As an example, the Runic calendar developed in medieval Sweden was lunisolar, fixing the beginning of the year at the first full moon after winter solstice.

== Funerary practices ==
During the Pre-Roman Iron Age, the possessions of the deceased was sometimes placed in a hollowed-out grave without an urn. During the Roman period, urns were typically placed in flat graves.

The deceased was buried along with his possessions so that he could bring them to the afterlife. Such possessions included weapons, personal adornments and other belongings, sometimes including the owner's horse and even his boat. In certain rare cases the deceased was even buried along with several of his servants, who would be slain for the purpose.

Tacitus reports that certain Germanic individuals were inhumated in mound graves. Archaeological evidence does not suggest that this was a common practice.

Cremation appears to have been much more common and long lasting in Scandinavia than in other Germanic territories.

Among the coastal and island peoples of the north, the deceased was often placed with all his possessions in his boat, and then set on fire. Boat burials remained common in later times, even when inhumation was reintroduced. In such burials, the body was often placed in a boat over which a burial mound was erected.

Inhumation became common again during the Migration period. Since such graves were often arranged in long rows, they have been called row-graves. They are not distinguished by mounds. Often they were arranged on either side of a high-way.

== Symbols ==
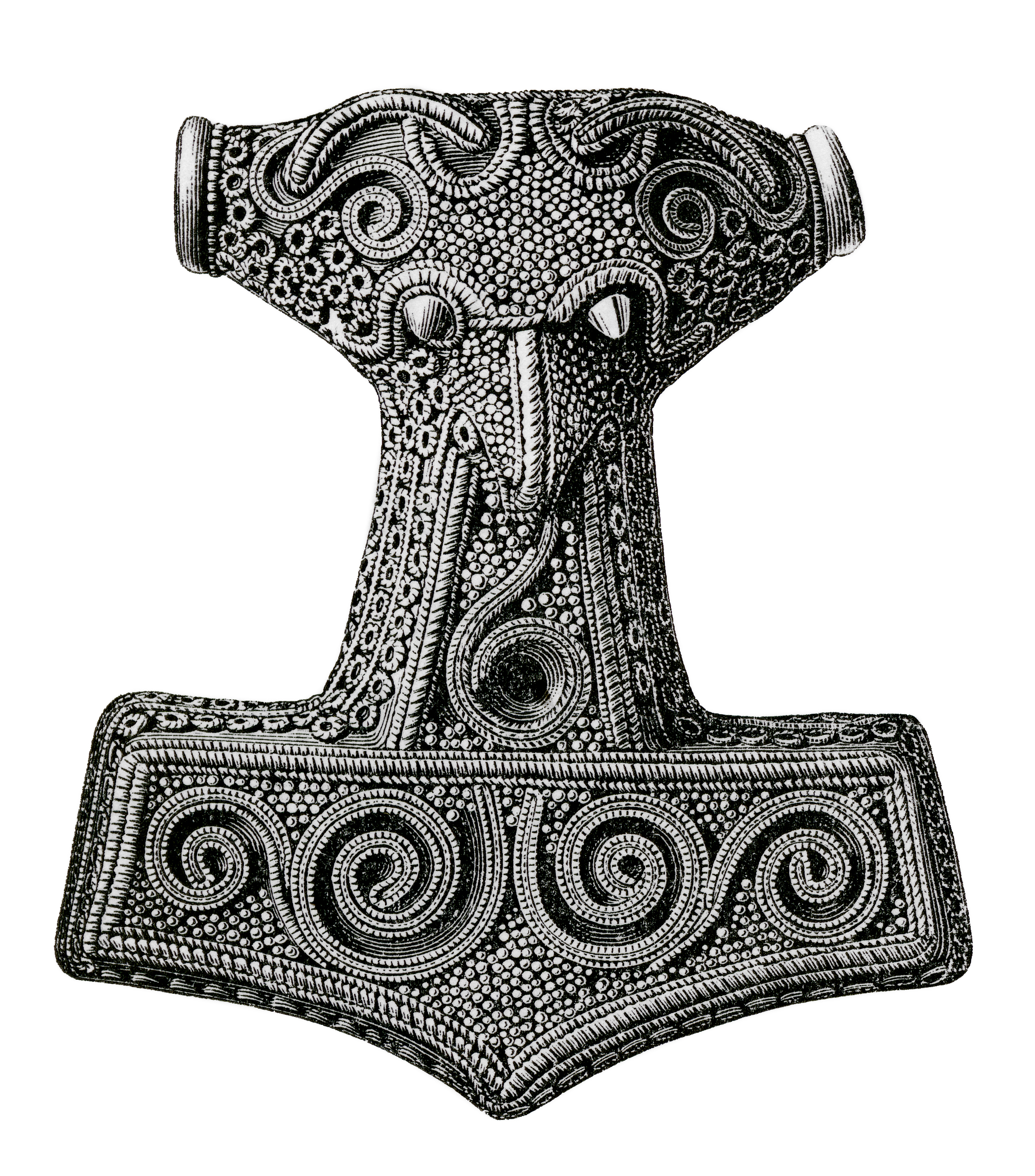
This Thor's hammer in silver with filigree ornamentation was found in Scania. It was donated to the Swedish History Museum in 1895.

There were many symbols of importance in early Germanic culture, including the sun cross and the swastika. Such symbols are attested from the Nordic Bronze Age up to the Viking Age.

== Patterns of thought ==
Early Germanic society was characterized by a rigorous code of ethics, which above all valued trust, loyalty and courage. (Note: "The rigorous ethics of early Germanic society, based on trust, loyalty, and courage, and the perhaps somewhat idealized picture of the moral code given by Tacitus, had a divine sanction...") The environment in which the Germanic peoples emerged, notably their attachment to the forest and the sea, played a major role in shaping such values. Germanic literature is filled with scorn for characters who failed to live the Germanic ideals.

Although Germanic society was highly stratified between leaders, freemen and slaves, their culture still emphasized equality. On occasion, the freemen of the tribe would overrule the decisions of their own leaders.

== Law ==
Common elements of Germanic society can be deduced both from Roman historiography and comparative evidence from the Early Medieval period.

=== Kingship ===
A main element uniting Germanic societies was kingship, in origin a sacral institution combining the functions of military leader, high priest, lawmaker and judge. Germanic monarchy was elective; the king was elected by the free men from among eligible candidates of a family (OE cynn) tracing their ancestry to the tribe's divine or semi-divine founder. Under the influence of the Roman Empire, the power of Germanic kings over their own people increased throughout the centuries, partially because mass-migrations of the time required more stern leadership.

Caesar notes that in wartime, Germanic tribes would select a "magistrate" with supreme authority to wage war. Those who refused to follow him were considered traitors, and were subjected to social isolation:

When a nation either defends itself in war or wages it, magistrates are selected to be in charge of the war with power of life and death... Those unwilling to follow are thought as deserters and traitors and are no longer trusted in anything. (Note: "When a nation either defends itself in war or wages it, magistrates are selected to be in charge of the war with power of life and death... Those unwilling to follow are thought as deserters and traitors and are no longer trusted in anything.")

=== Assemblies ===
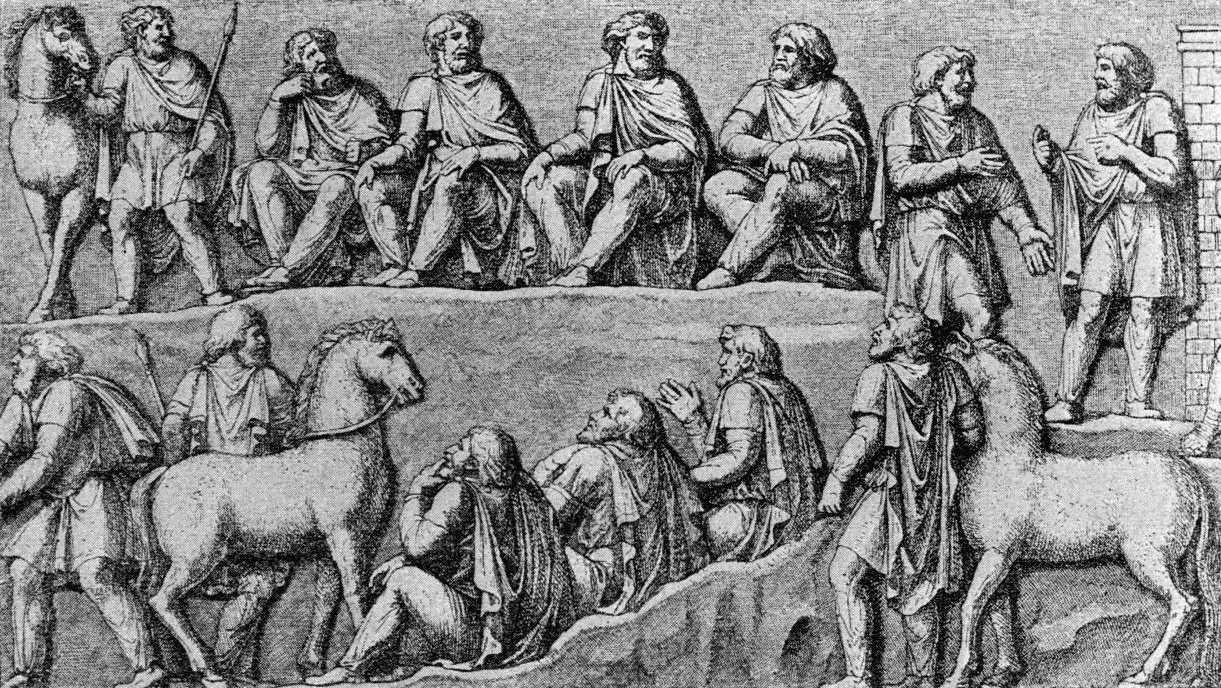
Germanic thing, drawn after the depiction in a relief of the Column of Marcus Aurelius (193 CE)

All freemen had the right to participate in general assemblies or things, where disputes between freemen were addressed according to customary law.

In the federalist organization of Switzerland, where cantonal structures remained comparatively local, the Germanic thing survived into the 21st century in the form of the Landsgemeinde, albeit subject to federal law.

=== Legal codes ===
The king was bound to uphold ancestral law, but was at the same time the source for new laws for cases not addressed in previous tradition. This aspect was the reason for the creation of the various Germanic law codes by the kings following their conversion to Christianity: besides recording inherited tribal law, these codes have the purpose of settling the position of the church and Christian clergy within society, usually setting the weregilds of the members of the clerical hierarchy parallel to that of the existing hierarchy of nobility, with the position of an archbishop mirroring that of the king.

Generally speaking, Roman legal codes eventually provided the model for many Germanic laws and they were fixed in writing along with Germanic legal customs. Traditional Germanic society was gradually replaced by the system of estates and feudalism characteristic of the High Middle Ages in both the Holy Roman Empire and Anglo-Norman England in the 11th to 12th centuries. The same effect of political centralization took hold in Scandinavia slightly later, in the 12th to 13th century (Age of the Sturlungs, Consolidation of Sweden, Civil war era in Norway), by the end of the 14th century culminating in the giant Kalmar Union.

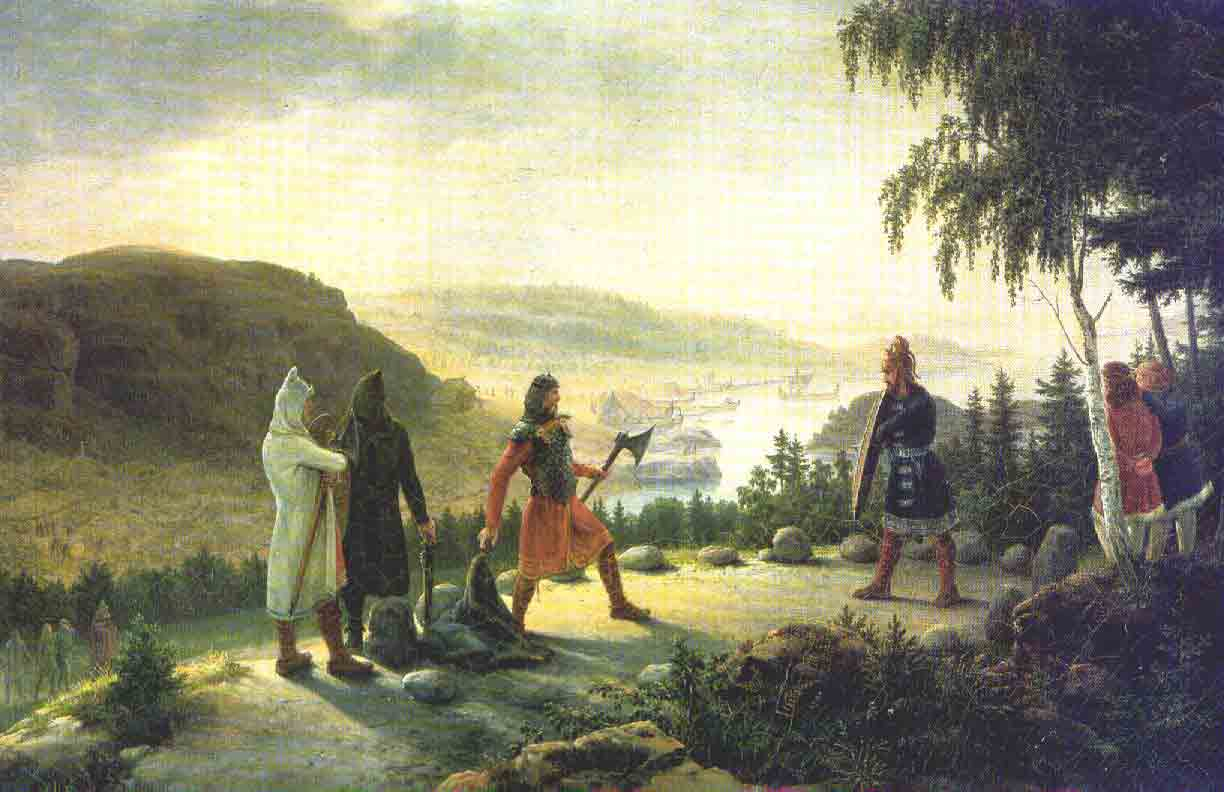
Egill Skallagrímsson engaging in holmgang with Berg-Önundr, painting by Johannes Flintoe

Elements of tribal law, notably the wager of battle, remained in effect throughout the Middle Ages, in the case of the Holy Roman Empire until the establishment of the Imperial Chamber Court in the early German Renaissance.

=== Punishment ===
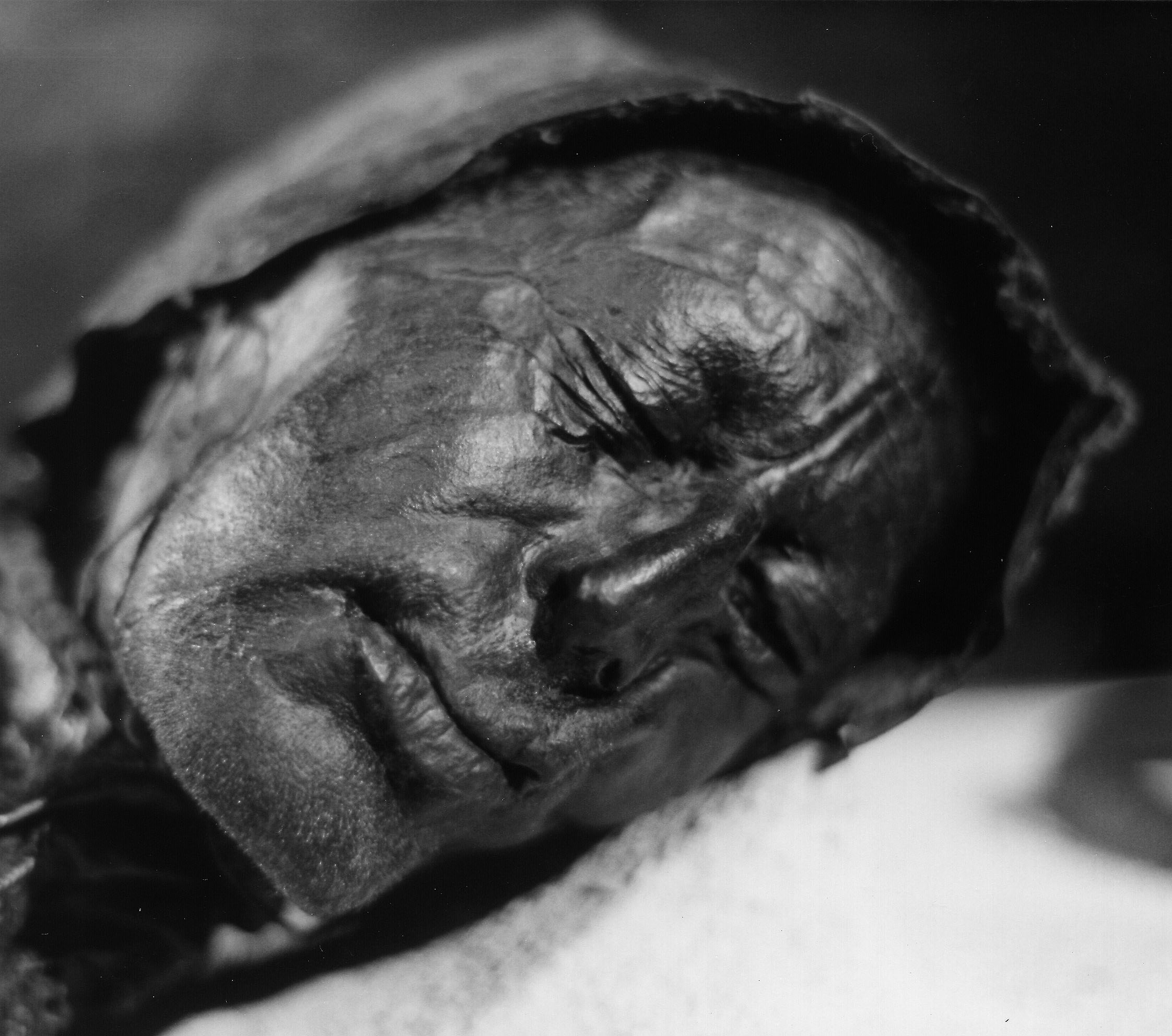
The Tollund Man of the 4th century BCE is one of the best studied examples of a bog body. Such bodies are often the remains of Germanic individuals subjected to capital punishment.

Capital crimes in early Germanic culture included treason, cowardice in battle, desertion, assassination, degenerate magical practices and robbery. Tacitus notes that traitors were on occasion hanged in trees, while cowards were disposed of by drowning them in swamps:

"Traitors and deserters are hanged on trees. Cowards, those who will not fight, and those who have defiled their bodies, are plunged into a boggy mire, with a wicker hurdle pressed on top of them."

Some bog bodies appear to have been bound, and it is possible that they were buried alive.

=== Weregild ===
Early Germanic law reflects a hierarchy of worth within the society of free men, reflected in the differences in weregild. The weregild was instituted as a way to prevent the blood feuds. It was a sum of money which was to be paid to the injured party as compensation for damage to person or property.

The amount of weregild to be paid depended upon the damage done and the position of the persons involved. It was generally regulated by the tribal assembly.

A fascinating component of early Germanic laws were the varying distinctions concerning the physical body, as each body part had a personal injury value and corresponding legal claims for personal injury viewed matters like gender, rank and status as a secondary interest when deliberating cases.

Among the Anglo-Saxons, a regular free man (a ceorl) had a weregild of 200 shillings (i.e. solidi or gold pieces), classified as a twyhyndeman "200-man" for this reason, while a nobleman commanded a fee of six times that amount (twelfhyndeman "1200-man").

Among the Alemanni the basic weregild for a free man was 200 shillings, and the amount could be doubled or tripled according to the man's rank. Unfree serfs did not command a weregild, and the recompense paid in the event of their death was merely for material damage, 15 shillings in the case of the Alamanni, increased to 40 or 50 if the victim had been a skilled artisan.

The social hierarchy is not only reflected in the weregild due in the case of the violent or accidental death of a man, but also in differences in fines for lesser crimes. Thus the fines for insults, injury, burglary or damage to property differ depending on the rank of the injured party. (Note: E.g. "If a freeman steal from the king, let him pay ninefold", in the Law of Æthelberht, paragraph 4.) They do not usually depend on the rank of the guilty party, although there are some exceptions associated with royal privilege. (Note: E.g. reduction of the weregild to half the regular amount if the man responsible for the killing is employed by the king in the laws of Æthelberht of Kent, paragraph 7.)

Free women did not have a political station of their own but inherited the rank of their father if unmarried, or their husband if married. The weregild or recompense due for the killing or injuring of a woman is notably set at twice that of a man of the same rank in Alemannic law.

=== Property ===
To a large degree, many of the extant legal records from the Germanic tribes seem to revolve around property transactions.

In early Germanic society, the free men of property each ruled their own estate and were subject to the king directly, without any intermediate hierarchy as in later feudalism. Free men without landed property could swear fealty to a man of property who as their lord would then be responsible for their upkeep, including generous feasts and gifts. This system of sworn retainers was central to early Germanic society, and the loyalty of the retainer to his lord generally replaced his family ties.

== Warfare ==
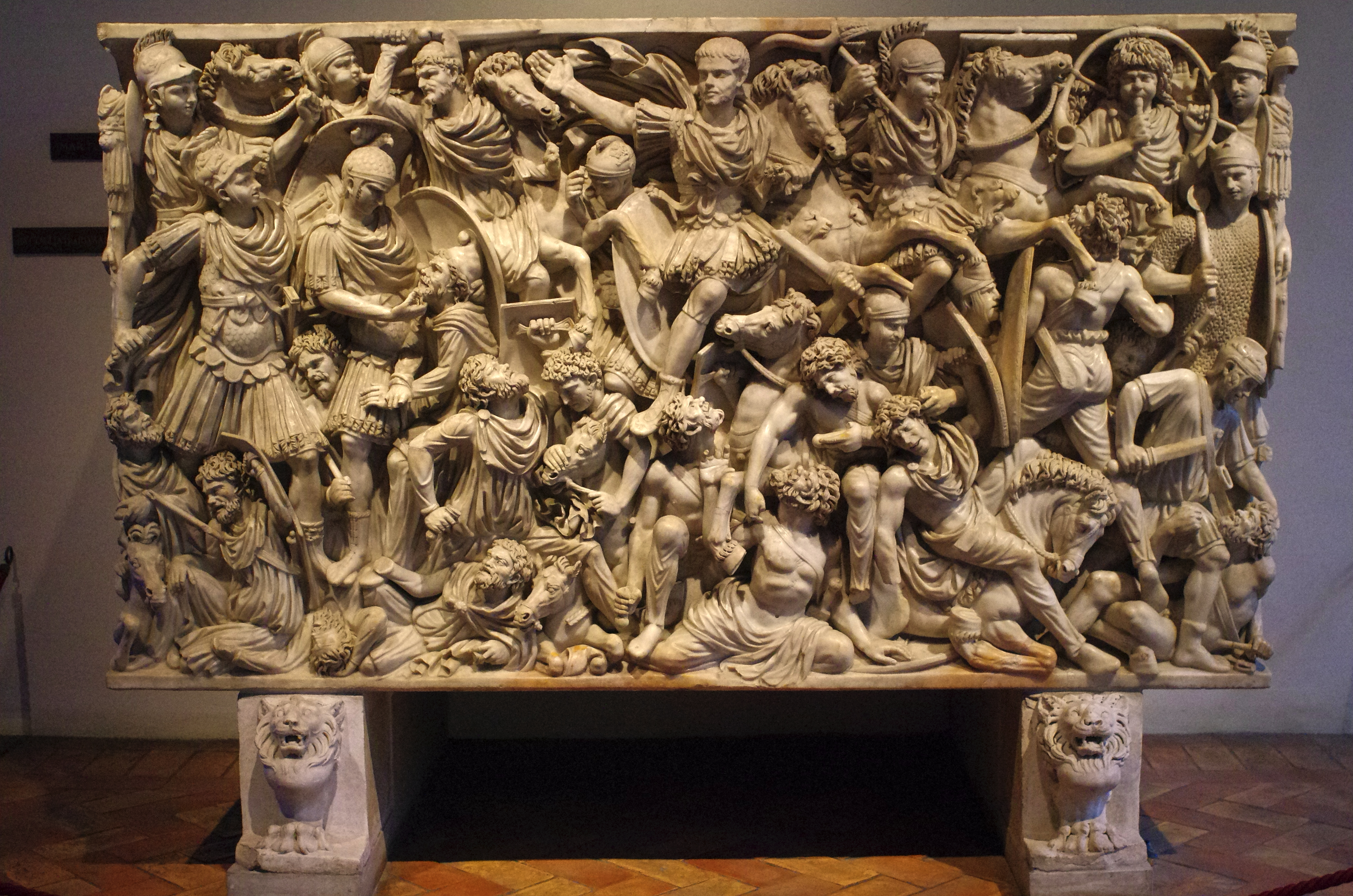
The 3rd-century Great Ludovisi sarcophagus depicts a battle between Goths and Romans.

Although the arrival of the Corded Ware culture in Northern Europe in the 3rd millennium BCE must have been accompanied by widespread conflict, Germanic society during the Nordic Bronze Age of the 2nd millennium BCE appears to have been largely peaceful. With the introduction of iron to northern Europe however, Germanic society became heavily characterized by war.

Germanic weapons were usually spears, javelins, shields and sometimes broad slashing swords, known as Spathae to the Romans. Shields were round, oval or hexagonal, often painted with tribal or clan symbols. Body armour and helmets were rare, being reserved for chiefs and their inner circle of warriors, many Germanic warriors often fought naked.

Even iron is not plentiful with them, as we infer from the character of their weapons. But few use swords or long lances. They carry a spear [hasta] (framea is their name for it), with a narrow and short head, but so sharp and easy to wield that the same weapon serves, according to circumstances, for close or distant conflict. As for the horse-soldier, he is satisfied with a shield and spear; the foot-soldiers also scatter showers of javelins each man having several and hurling them to an immense distance, and being naked or lightly clad with a little cloak.

— Tacitus, Germania

Germanic warfare largely emphasized offensive infantry warfare. Armies would typically attack in a wedge formation, with chieftains leading from the front fighting side by side with their immediate family members. Germanic warriors would eventually also excel at horse-powered warfare and naval warfare. Fortifications were rarely used, and as a result, there was little use for siege equipment. Raids by small war bands led by a charismatic leader, a so-called comitatus, was a common occurrence. Military training was started from an early age. During the time of the Roman Empire, large number of Germanic mercenaries served in the Roman army, some even gaining prominent positions. Early Germanic peoples believed that heroic death in battle would enable a warrior admittance to Valhalla, a majestic hall presided over by Odin, chief of the Germanic pantheon.

In times of distress, a Germanic tribe would on occasion embark on a wholesale mass-migration, in which the entire able-bodied population became engaged in war. In a series of Germanic Wars, invading Germanic peoples overwhelmed the Western Roman Empire and established themselves as the foremost military powers of Western Europe in its place.

== Economy ==
=== Agriculture ===
Germanic agriculture emphasized cereal production and animal husbandry. This depended on the nature of the area.

Cereals produced by Germanic agriculturalists was normally used for home consumption, rather than being sold or exported. Cattle hides was however an important export for Germanic merchants.

==== History ====
Traces of the earliest pastoralism of the Germanic peoples appear in central Europe in the form of elaborate cattle burials along the Elbe and Vistula Rivers from around 4000–3000 BCE.

==== Roman descriptions ====
Caesar writes that the Germanic tribes were not agricultural people, and that tribal leaders instituted active measures to prevent members of the tribe from becoming settled agriculturalists. Archaeological research has however discovered that this observation by Caesar is not entirely correct. Agriculture was and had been for a long time a key component in Germanic life. Caesar's observations were made from warlike tribes on the move near the Roman borders, and are thus not representative of all the Germanic peoples. That agriculture was an important part of Germanic life is attested by Caesar, when he writes that the Usipetes and Tencteri had been forced to migrate from their lands after the Suebi had sabotaged their crops.

Tacitus writes that the Germanic peoples were more of a pastoral people than an agricultural people. Wealth was in a large part measured by the amount of cattle owned. He noted that Germanic cattle was of smaller size than Roman cattle.

==== Crop raising ====
The chief cereal grains produced were wheat and barley. In later times oats and rye were also cultivated. Garden products such as beans, beets, peas and turnips were well known.

Evidence from a Saxon village known as Feddersen Wierde near Cuxhaven, Germany (which existed between BCE 50 to CE 450) shows that the Germanic peoples cultivated oats and rye, used manure as fertilizer, and that they practiced crop rotation.

==== Husbandry ====
Germanic agriculturalists primarily emphasized the raising of cattle, but goats, pigs, horses and sheep also played an important role. There were plenty of chickens, ducks and geese in Germanic farmyards. A Germanic farm was typically inhabited by a large number of dogs.

Germanic farmers harvested wool from their sheep, and used it for clothing. Oxen were used to plow the fields and for drawing wagons. This was the main means of transport. Horses were used for riding, and also later as a draft animal.

In areas along the North Sea coast, cattle raising appears to have been prevalent. This was because the high probability of flooding made agriculture risky. Similarly, in mountainous areas with good pasture but poor soil, husbandry was prevalent.

==== Agricultural settlements ====
Archaeological research has uncovered two forms of Germanic agricultural settlements. There were the farm village and the individual farm. The prevalence of either of these forms of settlements depended upon the nature of the land.

The prevalence of the individual farm among Germanic peoples has sometimes been ascribed to their love of independence. Such individual farms depended upon a plentiful supply of water. Areas with poor soil or where the area was broken up by hills also encouraged the prevalence of individual farms. In the Icelandic sagas only individual farms are mentioned, and this also appears to have been the case in Norway, from where most of the Icelanders came.

The establishment of agricultural villages was more common in areas with rich soil or a poor water supply. Such settlements were typically grouped around a common water supply. Such settlements required a more sophisticated form or communal organization.

==== Equipment ====
The plough was the most important form of agricultural equipment for the early Germanic peoples, who had abandoned the hoe in Neolithic times. The Germanic words for plough are of distinct Indo-European origin.

The plough was typically drawn by oxen, as shown in Bronze Age rock carvings. The wheel plough was eventually introduced to them from the south. It significantly improved the efficiency of Germanic agriculture.

The Germanic tribes appear to have been the first peoples to use the heavy plough, which enabled them to farm the rough forested lowlands of Northern Europe. In this respect their technology was superior to that of the Romans. (Note: "Teutonic tribes who moved into a large part of western Europe did not come empty-handed, and in some respects their technology was superior to that of the Romans. It has already been observed that they were people of the Iron Age, and although much about the origins of the heavy plow remains obscure these tribes appear to have been the first people with sufficiently strong iron plowshares to undertake the systematic settlement of the forested lowlands of northern and western Europe, the heavy soils of which had frustrated the agricultural techniques of their predecessors. The invaders came thus as colonizers. They may have been regarded as "barbarians" by the Romanized inhabitants of western Europe who naturally resented their intrusion, and the effect of their invasion was certainly to disrupt trade, industry, and town life. But the newcomers also provided an element of innovation and vitality.")

The Germanic word for harrow is of Indo-European origin, indicating that this tool was introduced at an early time. The sickle was used for the reaping of grain, while the ancient practice of beating out grain with sticks or tramping it out remained prevalent for a long time.

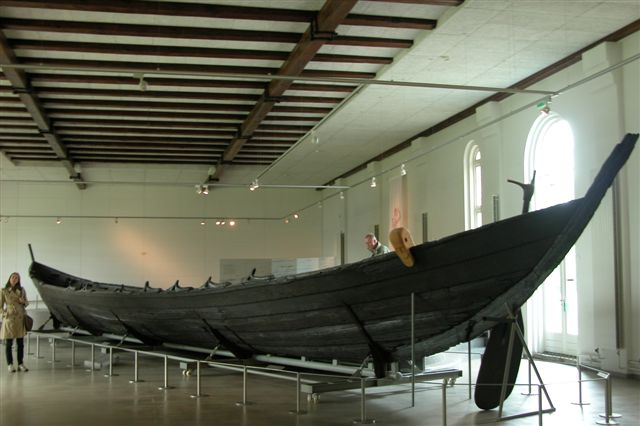
Iron Age oak boat discovered at Nydam Mose in Sønderborg, Denmark

The fields were tilled with a light-weight wooden ard, although heavier models also existed in some areas.

=== Fishing ===
Among Germanic peoples living along the coasts, fishing was an important business.

=== Trade ===
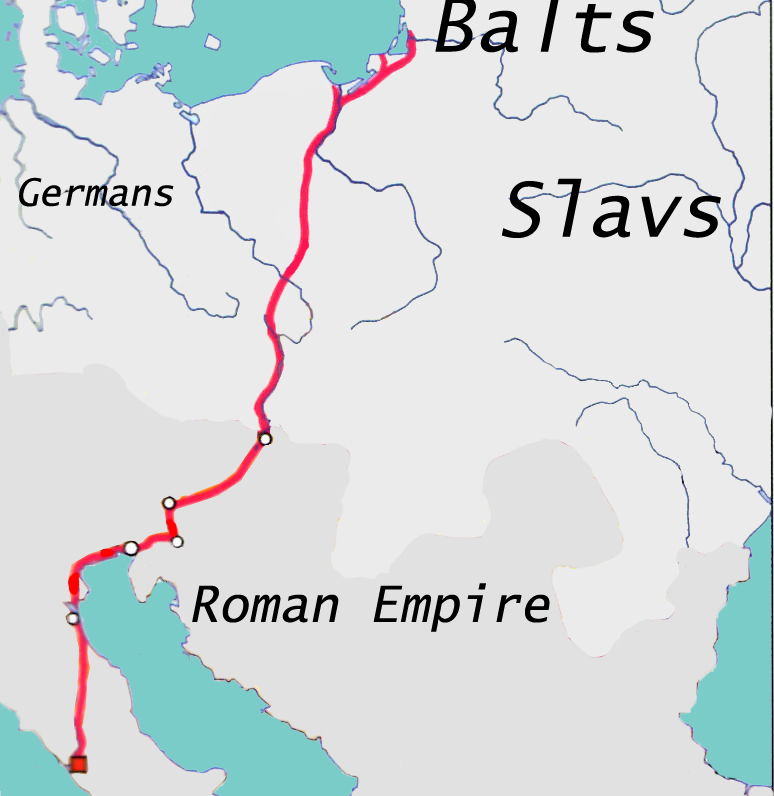
The Amber Road from the Baltic Sea to Rome

The presence of amber in Mycenaean graves, and the presence of Italian bronze daggers in Northern European graves, attest to trade relations between early Bronze Age Germanic peoples and the Mediterranean Sea. Such trade further increased in volume through the Iron Age.

Large amounts of amber has been discovered at sites of the Hallstatt culture. From the Hallstatt culture, this amber found its way to the Villanovan culture.

Roman goods exported by the Romans to Germanic territories include beads, coins, glassware, silverware and weapons. In turn the Romans received amber, cattle, fur and slaves. By the 4th century, wine became a very important Roman export to the Germanic world. It became a luxury product widely consumed by Germanic leaders.

The two most important trade routes between Rome and the Germanic world went either along the North Sea coast or along the Vistula towards the Adriatic. Significant trade routes were also located along the Oder and Elbe rivers.

Trade relations between Rome and the Germanic peoples increased throughout the history of the Roman Empire. This trade also facilitated increased cultural contacts. As the Germanic peoples became more and more acquainted with Roman industrial products, their appreciation of Roman coinage increased. The importation of Roman coins into Germanic territories reduced the importance of amber in Germanic society. Large collections of Roman coinage have been found deep into Germanic territories, even in Scandinavia.

Returning Germanic mercenaries in the Roman army brought back many Roman products to their communities.

One of the reasons the Romans may have drawn borders along the Rhine, besides the sizable population of Germanic warriors on one side of it, was that the Germanic economy was not robust enough for them to extract much booty nor were they convinced they could acquire sufficient tax revenue from any additional efforts of conquest. Drawing a distinctive line between themselves and Germanic people also incentivized alliances and trade as the Germanic people sought a share of the imperial wealth.

=== Finance ===
In early Germanic society, amber was an important medium of exchange.

Early Germanic peoples are recorded as being intensely opposed to taxation. For this reason, it is noted by Salvian, native Romans in many cases preferred "barbarian" rule over Roman rule.

"For in the Gothic country the barbarians are so far from tolerating this sort of oppression that not even Romans who live among them have to bear it. Hence all the Romans in that region have but one desire, that they may never have to return to the Roman jurisdiction. It is the unanimous prayer of the Roman people in that district that they may be permitted to continue to lead their present life among the barbarians."

Roman coinage was coveted by the Germanic people who preferred silver to gold coins, mostly likely indications that a market economy was developing. Tacitus does mention the presence of a bartering system being observable among the Germanic people, but this was not exclusive, as he also writes of their use of "gold and silver for the purpose of commerce", adding rather sardonically in his text, that they preferred silver for buying cheap everyday goods. Such observations from Tacitus aside, fine metalwork, iron and glassware was soon being traded by the Germanic peoples along the coast of the North Sea of Denmark and the Netherlands.

=== Slavery ===
Slavery was common among the early Germanic peoples. Slaves were both captured during war and purchased. Certain slaves had on the contrary lost their freedom through gambling. Such individuals were however generally expelled from the community. As the Germanic peoples were frequently engaged in war, there was a constant supply of cheap slaves, although slavery was never as important an institution as it became in ancient Rome.

In the Germanic economy, slaves performed both domestic work and farm labor. Attractive female slaves would often end up as concubines for leaders and wealthy landowners. Gladiator games between slaves, such as those carried out in ancient Rome, is not mentioned as having been common among Germanic peoples, although it is possible that such games were arranged among the Germanic peoples living on the Roman border.

According to Tacitus, Germanic peoples treated slaves more mildly than contemporary peoples. Although the master had complete power of life and death over his slave, mistreatment of slaves is not recorded in early Germanic literature.

=== Craftsmanship ===
[W]ith their great ferocity [Germans] combine great craft, to an extent scarcely credible to one who has had no experience with them, and are a race to lying born...

— Marcus Velleius Paterculus

After 1300 BCE the societies of Northern Europe experienced a major revolution in technology during the Late Bronze Age, shaping tools, containers and weapons through the improved techniques of working bronze. Both the sword and the bow and arrow as well as other weaponry proliferate and an arms race of sorts between the tribes ensued as they tried to outpace one another. Trade was taking place to a greater degree and simple gems and amber from the Mediterranean indicate that long-distance exchange of goods was occurring.

Important small-scale industries in Germanic society were weaving, the manual production of basic pottery and, more rarely, the fabrication of iron tools, especially weapons.

When the Iron Age arrived, the Germanic people showed greater mastery of ironworks than their Celtic contemporaries but they did not have the extensive trade networks during this period that their western neighbors enjoyed with the Greco-Roman world. (Note: "The Teutonic tribes who conquered and divided the Roman Empire were little versed in the monumental arts and unskilled in figure representation; but in metalworking, in the making of weapons and other utilitarian objects, and in the delicate ornament of the goldsmith's art they excelled..") In many cases in fact, ancient Germanic smiths and other craftsmen produced products of higher quality than the Romans. (Note: "Some smiths were able to rework iron into high-quality steel and make sword blades with a core of softer steel for flexibility and harder steel on the exterior to keep a sharp edge, far finer weapons than those used in the Roman army at the time.") (Note: "Furthermore, the skills of Germanic smiths and other craftsmen were as good as, or better than those found inside the Roman empire.")

Germanic metalworkers must have held very important positions in their societies. This is attested by the respect accorded to master craftsmen in Germanic literature, such as Wayland the Smith.

== Architecture ==
=== Mead hall ===
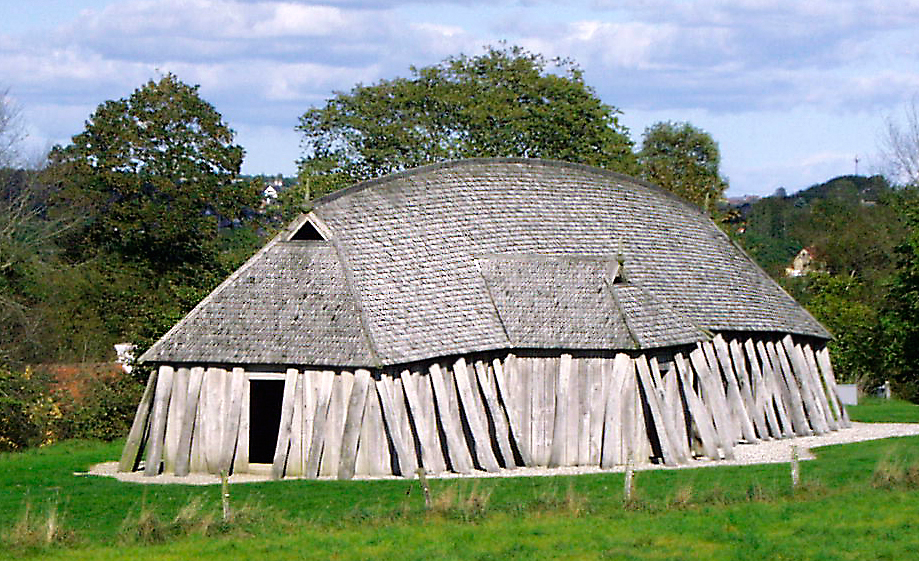
A reconstructed Viking Age mead hall, 28.5 metres (94 ft) long

A significant structure in Germanic architecture was the mead hall. It was designed for the purpose of serving as a dining-hall, sleeping-room and assembly for the chieftain and his followers. Such hall are vividly described in the Germanic epics.

In Beowulf, which takes place in 6th century Scandinavia, the mead hall is described as a quadrilateral structure of wood with a raised platform on either side within. In the center on one side of the mead-hall, there was a high-seat and a secondary high-seat, which were reserved for the chieftain and his guest of honor respectively. In front of the high-seats were long tables upon which heavy planks were raised. The chief's followers would sleep in the hall at raised platforms during the night, with their equipment hanging above on the wall ready for use.

The king would normally sleep in a separate structure. A blazing hearth was placed in the center of the hall.

=== Infrastructure ===
Archaeologists have discovered a number of well-constructed roads across moors in Germanic territories. Although the Germanic peoples were not road-builders, paths and wagon tracks were created. They later learned the art of road-building from Roman engineers.

Germanic peoples did not build bridges. Rivers were instead crossed at fords or by boats. This is vividly described in the Nibelungenlied.

=== Dwellings ===
The dwelling houses of the Germanic tribes varied by locality and time period. Typically, they were of timber and constructed rectangularly with walls of upright posts. Intervening spaces were filled with interwoven twigs and branches, and then smeared with clay. When dry this had the same effect as modern stucco. Roofs were thatched with grass or straw.

Early Germanic houses were typically unitary, housing both humans and animals. Buildings often had upright logs or posts as walls, long crossed rafters at the top and thatched saddle roofs, with the interior of the house being divided into three parts by two rows of posts. The entrance was typically on the side and there was an exit in the roof for the smoke from the hearth. The living quarters were generally in one part of the building, while the stalls for cattle were in the side areas.

Round houses were not uncommon in Germanic architecture, but was more frequent among the Celts. On the Column of Marcus Aurelius, Roman soldiers are depicted setting fire to such round houses belonging to the Marcomanni.

A more simple Germanic construction were log huts with thatched roofs at an angle of ca. 45 degrees. Such structures are described by Strabo and Pliny, who claim that those could be loaded on wagons and established at a new place. These constructions were probably utilized during times of war or migration.

Germanic houses were frequently constructed on artificial mounds as a measure against flooding. This form of construction was particularly common along the North Sea coast, where floods were frequent.

Houses belonging to powerful members of the community were normally quite spacious.

=== Settlements ===
Germanic settlements were typically small, rarely containing much more than ten households, often less, and were usually located by clearings in the woods. (Note: This and the following information is based on Geary and Innes.) Settlements remained of a fairly constant size throughout the period.

Germanic settlements were typically along the coasts and rivers.

=== Other buildings ===
The more simple structures in Germanic villages were often dug-out shelters with dung-covered roofs. These were generally used as supply-rooms, work-rooms or dwelling places for the poor.

=== Feddersen Wierde ===
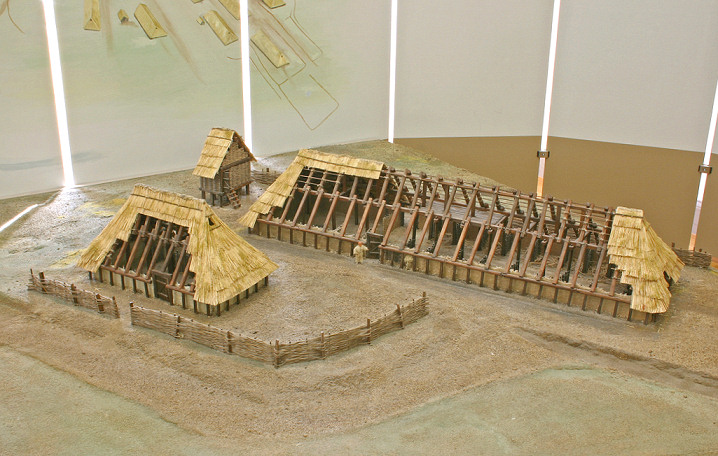
A reconstructed house from Feddersen Wierde in the Lower Saxon State Museum Hanover

The best known settlements are the wurts, or warfts in North Germany. The classic site is Feddersen Wierde, near Cuxhaven at the mouth of the River Weser. This was inhabited from the first century BCE until the fifth century CE, when due to the rising sea level, they probably emigrated to England. A comprehensive archaeological excavation between 1954 and 1963 yielded valuable knowledge about prehistoric settlements in North Germany.

== Cuisine ==
=== Diet ===
Although the Germanic tribes practiced both agriculture and husbandry, the latter was extremely important both as a source of dairy products and as a basis for wealth and social status, which was measured by the size of an individual's herd.

Caesar writes that the Germanic peoples mainly consumed milk, cheese and meat.

The diet consisted mainly of the products of farming and husbandry and was supplied by hunting to a very modest extent. Barley and wheat were the most common agricultural products and were used for baking a certain flat type of bread as well as brewing beer.

Beowulf and the Icelandic sagas describe a society with a plentiful supply of food.

Many of the famous Germanic mass-migrations carried out appear to have been motivated by famine, often induced by crop failures.

=== Drinks ===
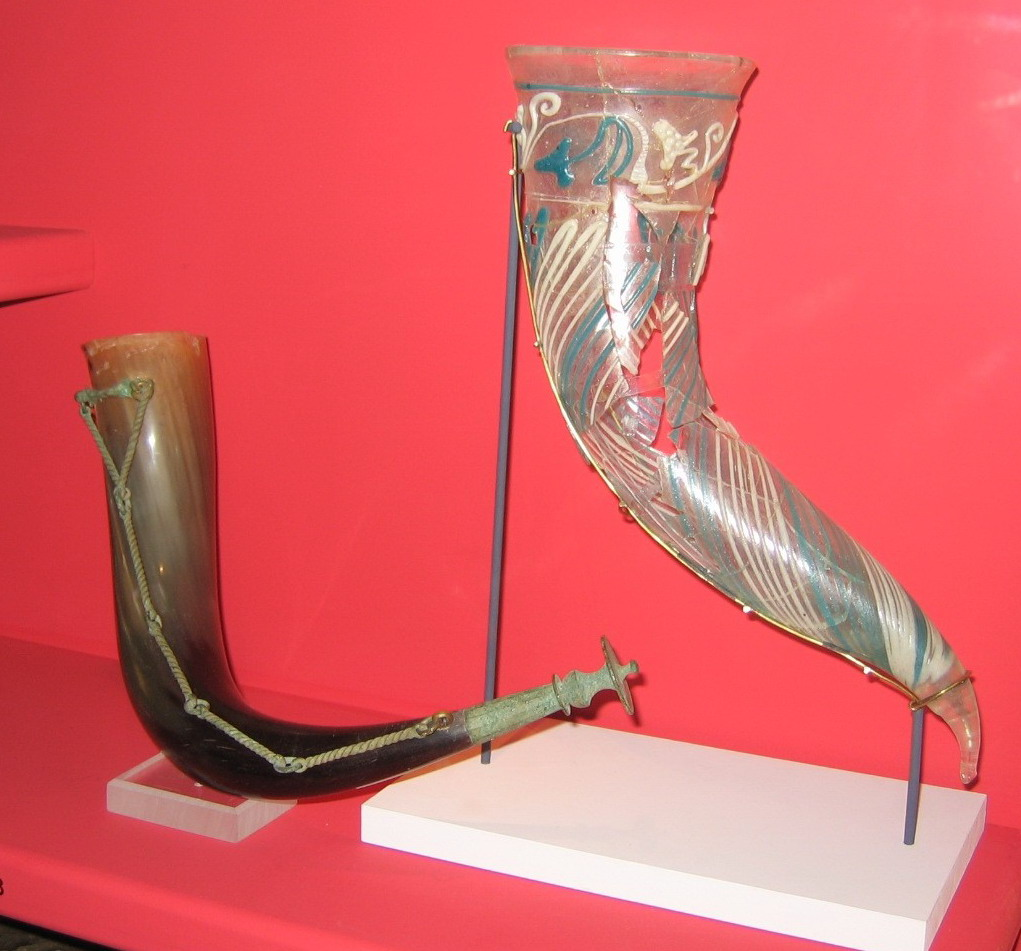
Vendel Period bronze horn fittings and 3rd century glass drinking horn on display at the Swedish Museum of National Antiquities

Early Germanic peoples prepared both ale, mead, beer and wine. The importance of drinking at social functions is vividly described in pieces of Germanic literature such as Beowulf, the Nibelungenlied and the Poetic Edda.

Both the words beer and ale are of distinct Germanic origin, having no cognates in other Indo-European languages.

Tacitus notes that the Germanic drink was "a liquid made from barley or wheat fermented into a faint resemblance of whine."

Evidence from Germanic literature and the Germanic vocabulary show that mead played a particularly important role in early Germanic culture. The oldest mentioning of mead being drunk by the Germanic tribes is from the 5th century writer Priscus, who writes that mead was being consumed at the court of Attila. Mead was prepared through boiling a mixture of water and honey and leaving it to ferment. In later times wine was added to the mead.

Wine seems to have been introduced to the Germanic tribes at a late date, as this drink could not be produced in Northern Europe, and had to be imported.

Contrary to Caesar, Tacitus writes that several Germanic tribes were known to drink excessively. Germanic drinking bouts were often accompanied with violence. Tacitus adds in this connection that the Germanic peoples were more easily defeated through exploiting their vices than by attacking them militarily.

Caesar notes that certain warlike and powerful Germanic tribes, such as the Nervii and Suebi, practiced teetotalism, banning the import of alcoholic beverages to their territories in order to combat degeneracy. (Note: "[T]hey allowed import of no wine or other luxury goods, because they thought these things weakened spirits and diminished courage...") (Note: "They do not let wine be imported to them, for they think it softens men for hard work and makes them womanly.")

== Family life ==
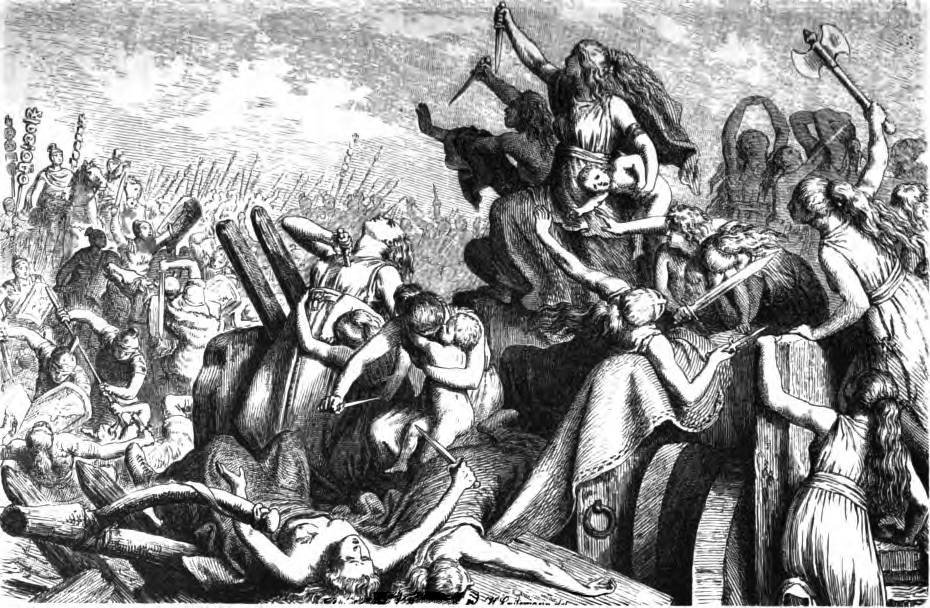
"The Women of the Teutons Defend the Wagon Fort" (1882) by Heinrich Leutemann

The most important family relationships among the early Germanic peoples were within the individual household, a fact based on the archaeological evidence from their settlements where the long-houses appeared to be central in their existence. Within the household unit, an individual was equally bound to both the mother and the father's side of the family.

Fathers were the main figures of authority, but wives also played an important and respected role. Children were valued, and according to Tacitus, limiting or destroying one's offspring was considered shameful.

Besides parents and children, a household might include slaves, but slavery was uncommon, and according to Tacitus, slaves normally had households of their own. Their slaves (usually prisoners of war) were most often employed as domestic servants.

=== Extended family ===
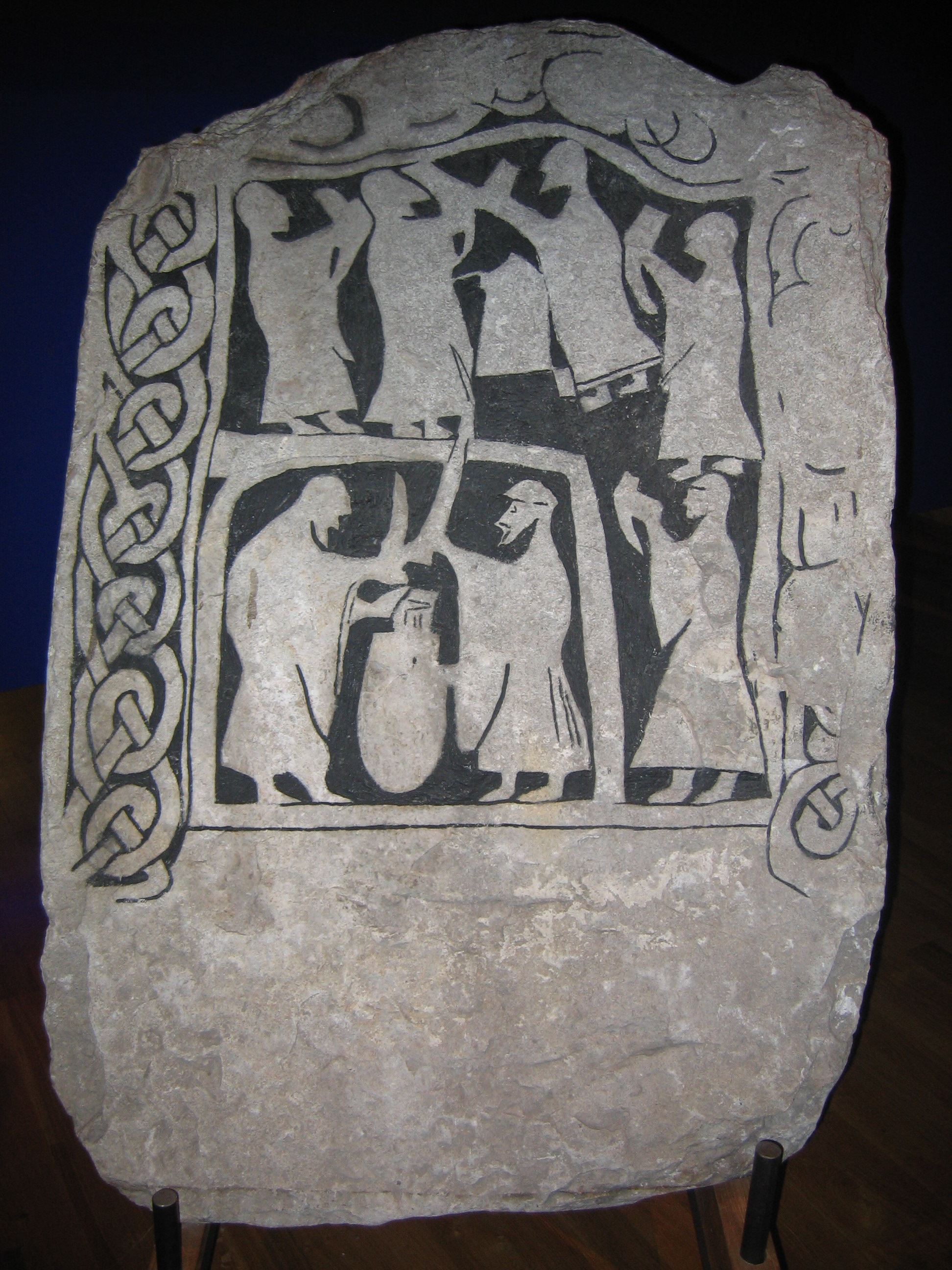
A drinking scene on an image stone from Gotland, in the Swedish Museum of National Antiquities in Stockholm

A Germanic family was part of an extended family known as the sippe, which was the basis for the organization of Germanic society. The sippe provided the basis for the organization of the "hundreds" in times of war, and determined the amount of weregild to be paid in disputes. A family was the core of the household, which also included slaves and others who worked on the estate.

The writings of Tacitus allude to the Germanic peoples being aware of a shared ethnicity, in that, they either knew or believed that they shared a common biological ancestor with one another. Just how pervasive this awareness may have been is certainly debatable, but other factors like language, clothing, ornamentation, hair styles, weapon types, religious practices and shared oral history were likely just as significant in tribal identity for the Germanic peoples.

Members of a Germanic tribe told tales about the exploits of heroic founding figures who were more or less mythologized. Village life consisted of free men assembled under a chieftain, all of whom shared common cultural and political traditions. Status among the early Germanic tribes was often gauged by the size of a man's cattle herd or by one's military prowess.

Before their conversion to Christianity, the Germanic peoples of Europe were made up of several tribes, each functioning as an economic and military unit and sometimes united by a common religious cult. Outsiders could be adopted into a new tribe. Kinship, especially close kinship, was very important to life within a tribe but generally was not the source of a tribe's identity. In fact, several elements of ancient Germanic life tended to weaken the role of kinship: the importance of the retinues surrounding military chieftains, the ability of strong leaders to unite people who were not closely related, and feuds and other conflicts within a tribe that might lead to permanent divisions.

A code of ethics in battle prevailed among the Germanic kin. According to Tacitus, the greatest disgrace that can befall a warrior of a clan among the Germanic tribes was the abandonment of their shield during combat, as this almost certainly resulted in social isolation. Within tribal Germanic society, their social hierarchy was linked intrinsically to war and this warrior code maintained the fidelity between chiefs and their young warriors.

Feuds were the standard means for resolving conflicts and regulating behavior. Peace within the tribe was about controlling violence with codes identifying exactly how certain types of feuds were to be settled. Those closely related to a person who had been injured or killed were supposed to exact revenge on or monetary payment from the offender. This duty helped reaffirm the bonds between extended family members. Yet such feuds weakened the tribe as a whole, sometimes leading to the creation of a new tribe as one group separated from the rest. Clans of Germanic people consisted of groupings of about 50 households in total with societal rules for each specific clan.

Recent scholarship suggests that, despite the obligation to take part in feuds and other customs involving kinship ties, extended families did not form independent units among the early Germanic peoples. Though most members of a tribe would have been more or less distantly related, common descent was not the main source of a tribe's identity, and extended families were not the main social units within a tribe. Traditional theories have emphasized the supposedly central role in Germanic culture of clans or large groups with common ancestry. But there is little evidence that such clans existed, and they were certainly not an important element of social organization. As historian Alexander C. Murray concludes, "kinship was a crucial factor in all aspects of barbarian activity, but its uses and groupings were fluid, and probably on the whole not long lasting." Internal competition within the factions of a tribe occasionally resulted in internecine warfare which weakened and sometime destroyed a group, as appears to have been the case for the Cherusci tribe during Rome's earlier period.

When a certain number of families resided on the same territory, this constituted a village (Dorf in German). The overall territory occupied by people from the same tribe was designated in the writings of Tacitus as a civitas, with each of the individual civitas divided into pagi (or cantons), which were made up of several vici.

In cases where the tribes were grouped into larger confederations or a group of kingdoms, the term pagus was applied (Gau in German). Extensive contact with Rome altered the egalitarian structure of tribal Germanic society. As individuals rose to prominence, a distinction between commoner and nobility developed and with it the previous constructs of folkright shared equally across the tribe was replaced in some cases by privilege. As a result, Germanic society became more stratified. Elites within the Germanic tribes who learned the Roman system and emulated the way they established dominion were able to gain advantages and exploit them accordingly.

Important changes began taking place by the 4th century CE as Germanic peoples, while still cognizant of their unique clan identities, started forming larger confederations of a similar culture. Gathering around the dominant tribes among them and hearkening to the most charismatic leaders brought the various barbarians tribes closer together. On the surface this change appeared to the Romans as welcome since they preferred to deal with a few strong chiefs to control the populations that they feared across the Rhine and Danube, but it eventually made these Germanic rulers of confederated peoples more and more powerful. While strong, they were still not federated to one another since they possessed no sense of "pan-Germanic solidarity", but this started to change noticeably by the 5th century CE at Rome's expense.

=== Role of women ===
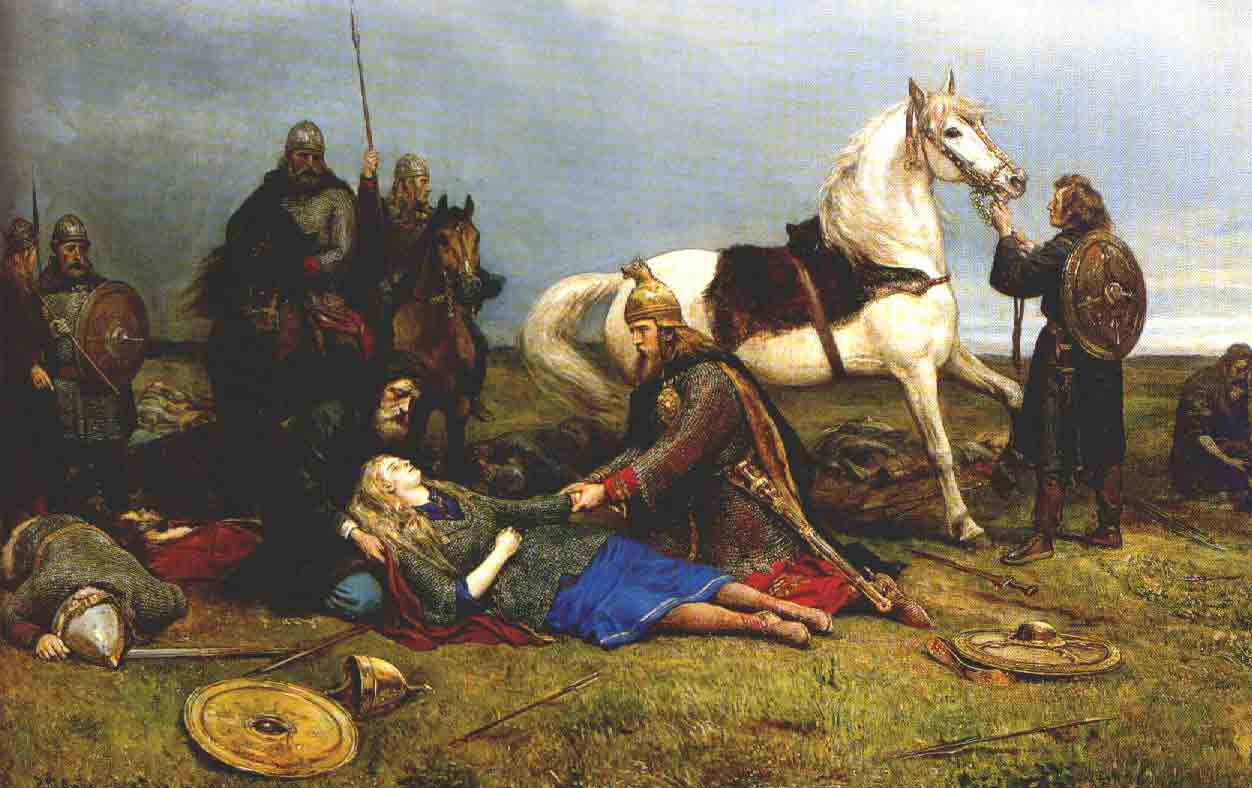
Hervor dying after the Battle of the Goths and Huns, by Peter Nicolai Arbo

In early Germanic society, a woman had no formal political rights, meaning that she was not permitted to participate in popular or tribal assemblies. She could be represented through her male relatives, and thus only exert influence from behind the scenes.

Despite their lack of direct political influence, Roman writers note that Germanic women had much influence in their society. Some tribes believed that women possessed magical powers and were feared accordingly. Female priestesses had a major influence on decisions made by Cimbri and Teutones during the Cimbrian War, and Ariovistus during his war with Caesar.

Germanic epics, such as the Nibelungenlied and Beowulf, describe the strong influence which royal women exerted in their society.

Goddesses revered among the Germanic tribes include Nerthus of the Ingvaeones and Freya.

Tacitus describes how, during battles, Germanic warriors were encouraged and cared for by their wives and mothers.

Germanic literature contains many references to mischief caused by women. Women playing a prominent role in Germanic literature include Gudrun, Brunhild and the wives of Gunther and Njáll Þorgeirsson.

=== Sexuality ===
Julius Caesar notes that early Germanic peoples believed sexual abstinence until adulthood increased physical growth and manliness. For a young Germanic man, having had sexual relations with a woman before the age of twenty was considered a disgrace:

"Their whole life is occupied in hunting and in the pursuits of the military art; from childhood they devote themselves to fatigue and hardships. Those who have remained chaste for the longest time, receive the greatest commendation among their people; they think that by this the growth is promoted, by this the physical powers are increased and the sinews are strengthened. And to have had knowledge of a woman before the twentieth year they reckon among the most disgraceful acts; of which matter there is no concealment..."

Caesar further noted, to his amazement, that men and women would frequently bath naked together in lakes and rivers.

=== Marital relations ===
==== Process of marriage ====
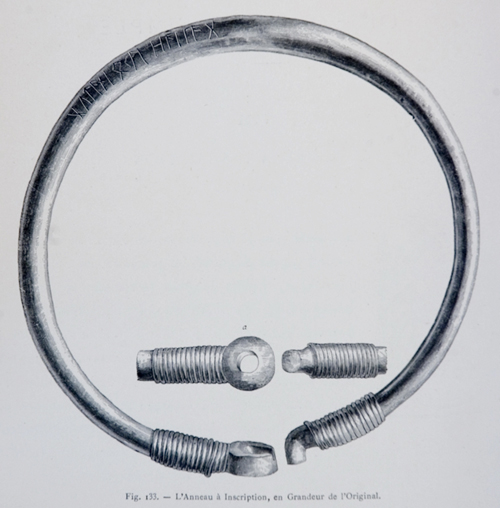
The Ring of Pietroassa (drawing by Henri Trenk, 1875)

Generally, there were two forms of marriage among the Germanic peoples, one involving the participation of the parents and the other, those that did not. Known as Friedelehe, the latter form consisted of marriage between a free man and a free woman, since marriage between free persons and slaves was forbidden by law.

Of note, Tacitus observed that "The dowry is not brought by the wife to the husband but by the husband to the wife" and wedding gifts related to a marriage consisted of things like oxen, saddles and various armaments.

The marriage of a daughter was typically arranged by her parents, although the wishes of the daughter was generally taken into considerations. Sometimes girls would be given away for marriage as a way to preserve the peace.

==== Marriageable age ====
The age at first marriage among ancient Germanic tribes, according to Tacitus, was late for women compared to Roman women:

"The young men are slow to mate, and reach manhood with unimpaired vigour. Nor are the virgins hurried into marriage. Being as old and as tall as the men, they are equal to their mates in age and strength, and the children inherit the robustness of their parents."

Where Aristotle had set the prime of life at 37 years for men and 18 for women, the Visigothic Code of law in the 7th century placed the prime of life at twenty years for both men and women, after which both presumably married. Thus it can be presumed that ancient Germanic brides were on average about twenty and were roughly the same age as their husbands. Anglo-Saxon women, like those of other Germanic tribes, are marked as women from the age of twelve onward, based on archaeological finds, implying that the age of marriage coincided with puberty.

==== Monogamy vs. polygamy ====
Tacitus notes that the Germanic tribes were strictly monogamous, and that adultery was severely punished:

Considering the great size of the population, adultery is very rare. The penalty for it is instant and left to the husband. He cuts off her hair, strips her naked in the presence of kinsmen, and flogs her all through the village. They have no mercy on a woman who prostitutes her chastity. Neither beauty, nor youth, nor wealth can find her another husband. In fact, no one there laughs about vice, nor is seducing and being seduced called "modern"... To limit the number of their children or to kill one of the later-born is regarded as a crime.

For those higher within their social hierarchy however, polygamy was sometimes practiced for tribal alliances.

==== Intermarriage ====
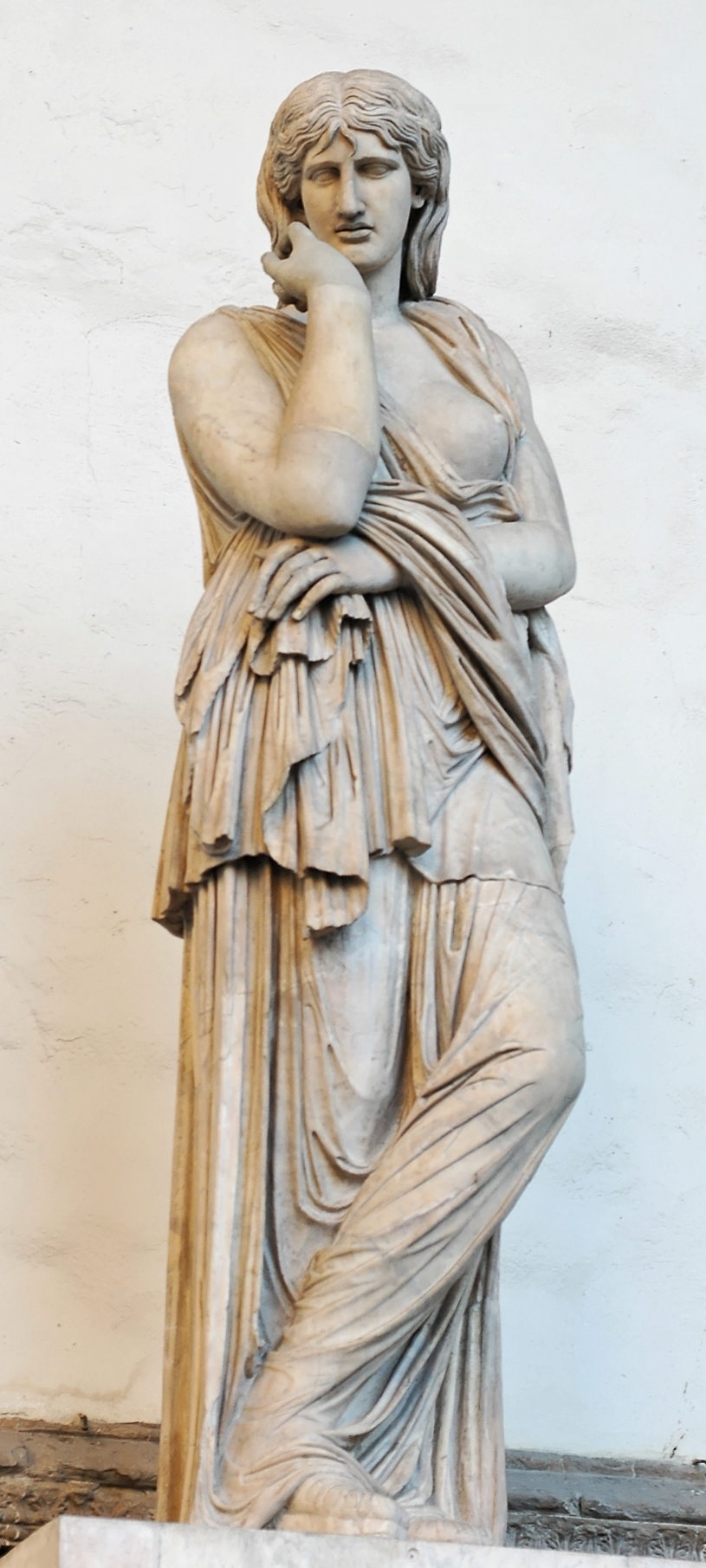
Statue of Thusnelda, wife of Arminius, at Loggia dei Lanzi, Florence

For Germanic kings, warrior chieftains, senators and Roman nobility, a certain degree of intermarriage was undertaken to strengthen their ties to one another and to the Empire, making marriage or connubium as the Romans connoted the bond, an instrument of politics. Earlier treaty terms in the late 4th century CE had forbidden "foreign" Goths to intermarry with Romans.

Some of the marriage attempts of the 6th century CE were deliberately planned for the sake of royal succession. Imperial policy had to be carefully charted between the Roman-Germanic claimants to kingship and the maintenance of Roman imperial administration, as the federated Germanic kings attempted to put their stamp on Roman rule and replace Roman armies with their own warriors.

Roman leaders were not oblivious to the clever tactics (intermarriage and offspring) employed by Germanic chieftains and adopted creative treaties to either appease them or temper their ambitions.

==== Marriage roles ====
Upon being married, a Germanic woman fell under the guardianship of her husband. She became his property. If a man was proven guilty of being violent towards his wife, her family would in some cases begin feud against her husband. Such feuds are described vividly in the Icelandic sagas.

Revealing the warlike nature of their society, Tacitus reported that wives came to their husbands as a partner in toils and dangers; to suffer and to dare equally with him, in peace and in war. Upon the death of their husbands and other male relatives on the battlefield and the defeat of their tribe, Germanic women are recorded by Roman historians as having killed their children and committed suicide. Such was the fate of the women of the Cimbri and Teutons after their defeat in the Cimbrian War.

For Germanic women of later antiquity, marriage obviously had its appeal since it offered greater security and better placement in their social hierarchy.

Evidence of Germanic patriarchy is evident later in the 7th century CE Edict of Rothari of the Lombards, which stated that women were not allowed to live of their own freewill and that they had to be subject to a man and if no one else, they were to be "under the power of the king".

In the case of renowned leaders, their wives were sometimes burned alive with their dead husbands. This tradition is vividly described in the Germanic epics, and the wives who subjected themselves to immolation are praised for their loyalty to their husbands.

== Archaeology ==
See the Jastorf culture for a discussion of Germanic archaeology.

== Appearances ==
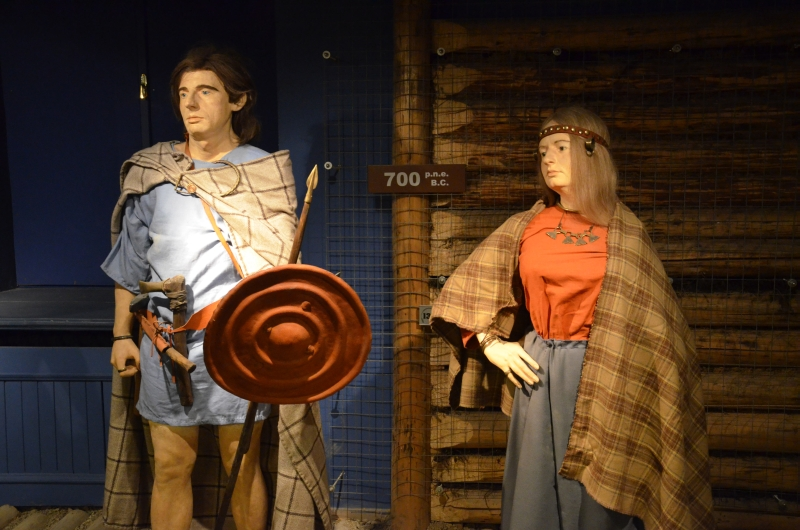
Attempt to reconstruct Bastarnae costumes at the Archaeological Museum of Kraków. Such clothing and weapons were commonplace among peoples on the Roman Empire's borders.

=== Sources ===
The practice of cremation by Germanic tribes of the Bronze Age and Pre-Roman Iron Age has made it difficult to ascertain the clothing of Germanic peoples during the initial years of the Iron Age. By the beginning of the Roman Iron Age however, burial practices were again changing, although little clothing is generally preserved in burials.

The clothing of Germanic criminals buried in the moors has however been well preserved due to the physical conditions. The descriptions by Roman writers, and particularly the depictions of Germanic warriors on Roman columns, provide valuable evidence of the clothing used by the early Germanic peoples.

=== Clothing ===
==== Male clothing ====
By the Roman Iron Age, as in the Bronze Age, Germanic peoples were wearing long-sleeved jackets reaching down the knees, and a skin or woolen mantle held at the neck with a brooch or safety pin. Contrary to the Bronze Age however, trousers were now being used. The adoption of this custom has been ascribed to climatic changes and the increased role of horsemanship in Germanic culture at the time.

Caesar notes that the Suebi wore only skins, but Tacitus does not agree with this in his observations a hundred years later. While customs might have changed during this time, it is probable that Caesar based his observations strictly from warriors. Evidence from Roman columns and moor bodies substantiate Tacitus.

Roman monuments typically depicts Germanic warriors as being naked from the waist up, except from a mantle worn over the shoulders. This was probably to achieve increased mobility.

From about the 3rd century CE, linen clothing appears more frequently, which is a sign of increasing wealth.

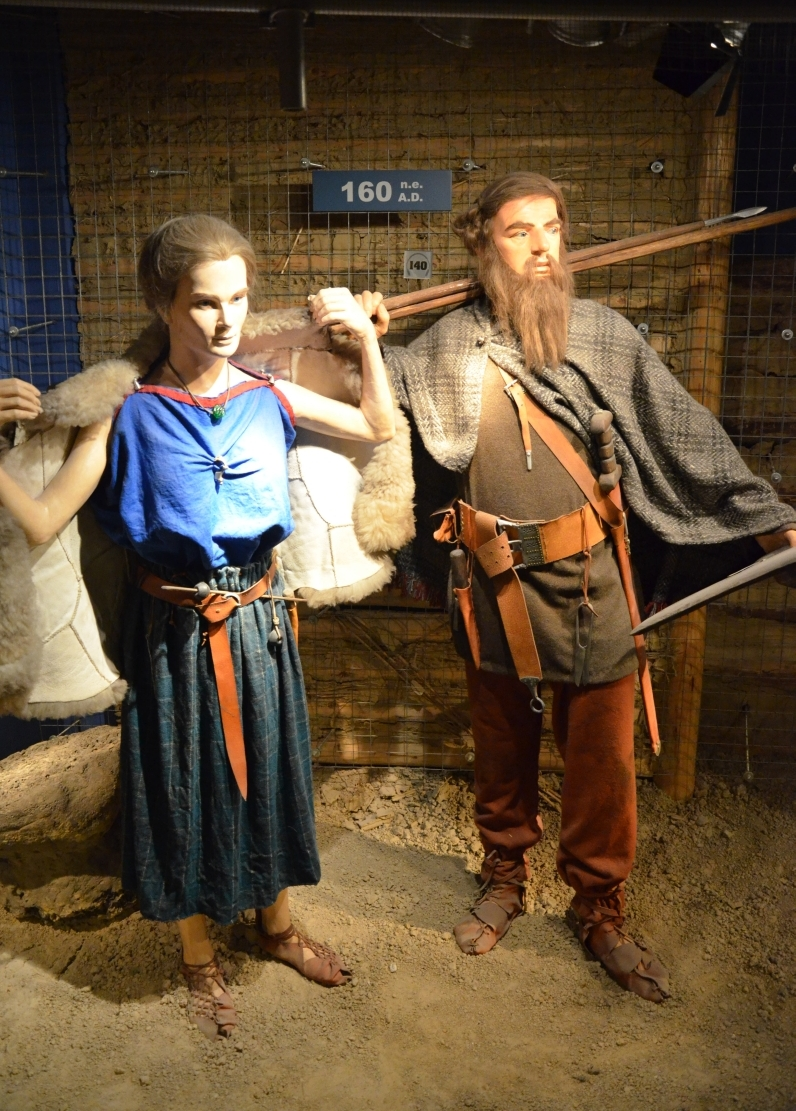
Reconstruction of the garments of the Vandalic couple, with the male having his hair in a Suebian knot (160 CE), Archaeological Museum of Kraków, Poland

Jackets from the 3rd century CE were typically worn over a linen garment. Short knee trousers were also worn. This is shown from moor burials, and from the fact that such trousers began to be used by Roman soldiers at the time, probably as an imitation of Germanic warriors.

==== Female clothing ====
The dress of Germanic women changed considerably from the Bronze Age to the Iron Age. In particular, skirts were more ample and free-flowing. The girle-ornament of the Bronze Age was no longer worn.

Tacitus writes that Germanic women more frequently wore linen garments than men. They wore long dresses that were generally dyed in red or other colors. This dress had a high waist and was generally sleeveless.

The dress of Germanic women indicate a high degree of practical knowledge of the use of materials. Women must have had a knowledge of dyeing, and colors were certainly derived from plants.

Germanic women are notably depicted in one Roman illustration with trousers and the upper part of the breast partly exposed. This is however not the case from moor burials and other illustrations. It is possible that this illustration was of a female figure symbolizing Germania rather than a typical Germanic woman.

=== Headgear ===
While Germanic males of the Bronze Age generally wore a helm-like cap, the Iron Age was characterized by leaving heads uncovered, whereas the head decorations of Germanic women varied considerably with the times. Women typically wore various kinds of "combs, hairpins and head decoration" as well as ornaments around the forehead; it was also customary for women to wear their hair long and short hair was considered "a mark of disgrace."

=== Shoes ===
Early Germanic peoples typically wore shoes of the sandal type.

=== Hairstyles ===
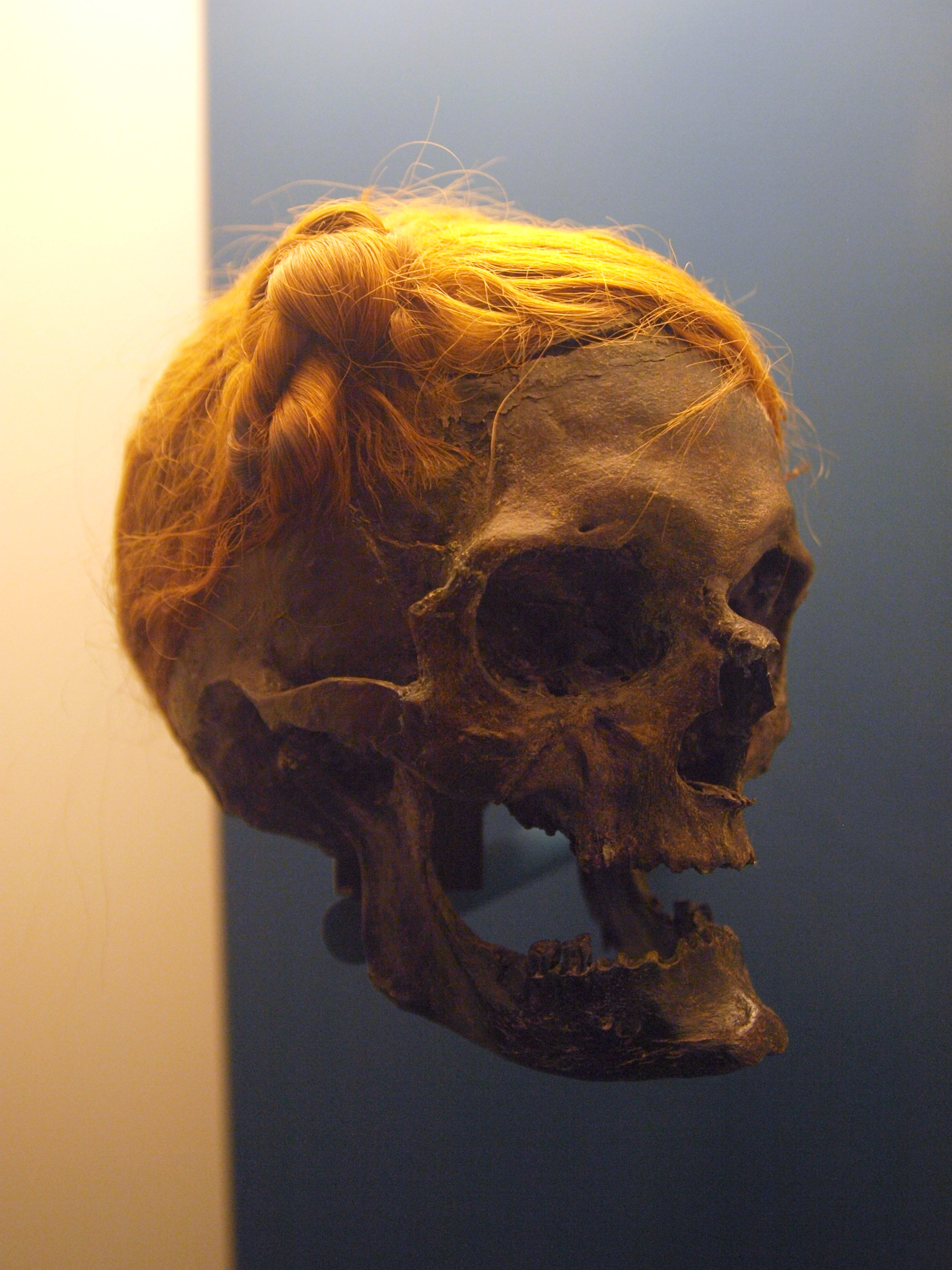
The Osterby Head with Suebian knot

By the Iron Age, Germanic warriors, particularly those of the Suebi, are known for wearing their hair in a so-called Suebian knot.

By the 3rd century CE, significant changes had occurred with regards to the Germanic hairstyle. The custom of wearing the hair long had become prominent among such peoples as the Franks, among whom it became a sign of noble birth and eligibility for kingship.

Germanic warriors are often depicted in Roman columns with full beards, but this practice probably varied from tribe to tribe and period to period.

Germanic women typically wore their hair long or plaited. Germanic women wore various types of hairpins and combs. It was considered disgraceful to wear the hair short.

=== Ornaments ===
The Germanic peoples of the Bronze Age are well known for their ornaments. The same techniques were handed down to the craftsmen of the Iron Age.

The display of ornaments played an important part in early Germanic culture. Products were made of both bronze, gold and silver. Early Germanic literature reserves a prominent place for ornaments such as the Brísingamen of the goddess Freya, the Nibelung hoard and the heirlooms of Beowulf.

== Recreational activities ==
=== Gambling ===
Roman writers note that Germanic peoples were extremely fond of gambling. Francis Owen note that these Roman observations were made from Germanic warriors, who were not necessarily representative of their communities as a whole.

== Germanic studies ==
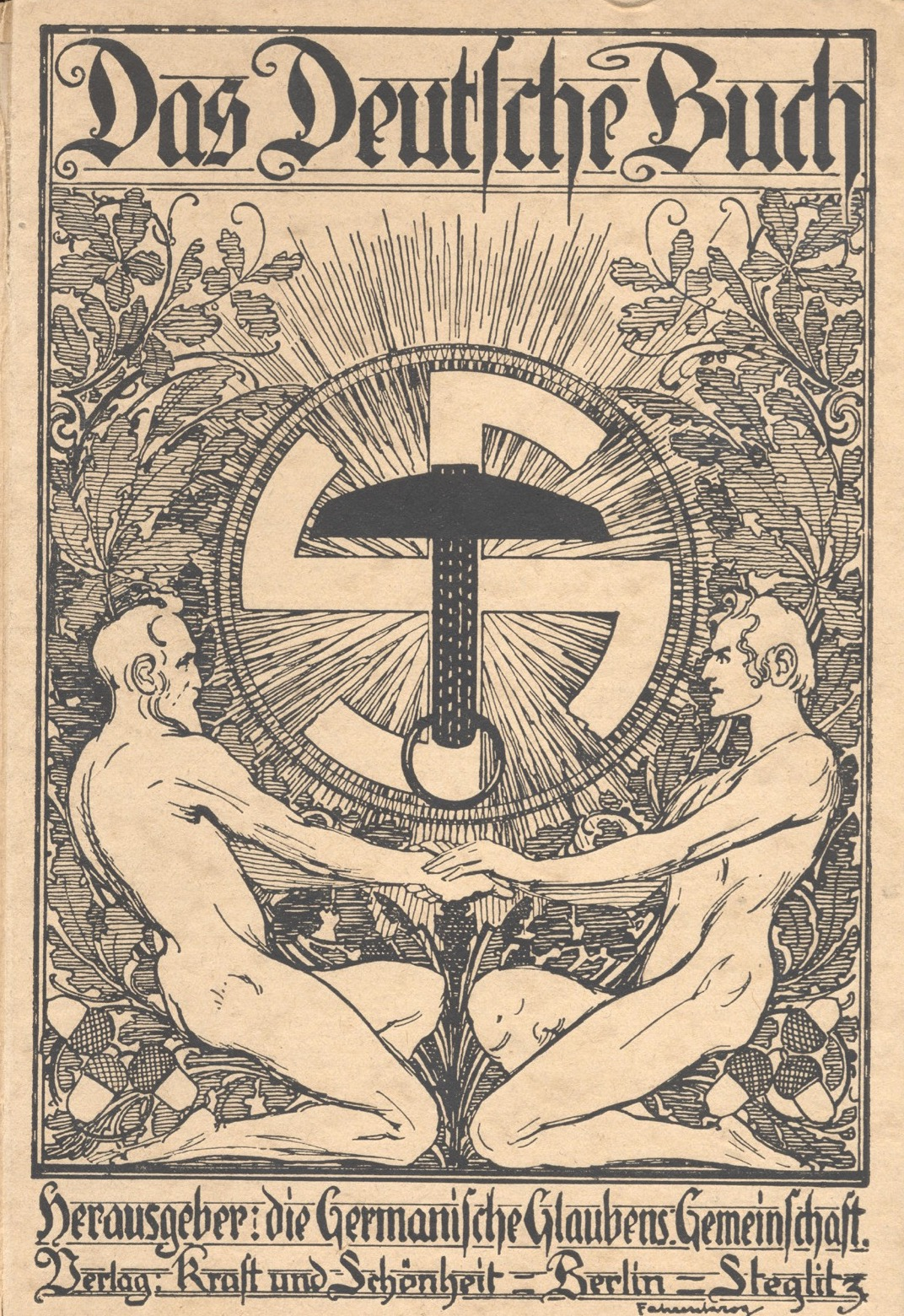
Das Deutsche Buch (1921) by Ludwig Karl Wilhelm Fahrenkrog

The Renaissance revived interest in pre-Christian Classical Antiquity and only in a second phase in pre-Christian Northern Europe. The Germanic peoples of the Roman era were often lumped with the other agents of the "barbarian" invasions, the Alans and the Huns, as opposed to the civilized Roman identity of the Holy Roman Empire.

Early modern publications dealing with Old Norse culture appeared in the 16th century, e.g. Historia de gentibus septentrionalibus (Olaus Magnus, 1555) and the first edition of the 13th century Gesta Danorum (Saxo Grammaticus), in 1514.

Authors of the German Renaissance such as Johannes Aventinus discovered the Germani of Tacitus as the "Old Germans", whose virtue and unspoiled manhood, as it appears in the Roman accounts of noble savagery, they contrast with the decadence of their own day.

The pace of publication increased during the 17th century with Latin translations of the Edda (notably Peder Resen's Edda Islandorum of 1665). The Viking revival of 18th century Romanticism created a fascination with anything "Nordic" in disposition.

The beginning of Germanic philology proper begins in the early 19th century, with Rasmus Rask's Icelandic Lexicon of 1814, and was in full bloom by the 1830s, with Jacob Grimm's Deutsche Mythologie giving an extensive account of reconstructed Germanic mythology and composing a German dictionary (Deutsches Wörterbuch) of Germanic etymology. Jacob Grimm also coauthored with his brother Wilhelm, the famous Grimm's Fairy Tales. Apart from linguistic studies, the subject of what became of the Roman era Germanic tribes, and how they influenced the Middle Ages and the development of modern Western culture was a subject discussed during the Enlightenment by such as writers as Montesquieu and Giambattista Vico.

The development of Germanic studies as an academic discipline in the 19th century ran parallel to the rise of nationalism in Europe and the search for national histories for the nascent nation states developing after the end of the Napoleonic Wars. A Germanic national ethnicity offered itself for the unification of Germany, contrasting the emerging German Empire with its neighboring rivals of differing ancestry. The emergence of a German ethnic identity was subsequently founded upon national myths of Germanic antiquity. These tendencies culminated in a later Pan-Germanism, Alldeutsche Bewegung which had as its aim, the political unity of all of German-speaking Europe (all Volksdeutsche) into a Germanic nation state.

Contemporary Romantic nationalism in Scandinavia placed more weight on the Viking Age, resulting in the movement known as Scandinavism.

Following World War II there was a backlash against nationalism, and as a response, government support for the study of ancient Germanic history and culture was significantly reduced both in Germany and Scandinavia. (Note: "In Germany...the first need was to detach prehistoric studies from the political influences of the pre-war period. German archaeologists, like their Scandinavian colleagues though sometimes for different reasons, have had to make do with very slender financial resources.") In these years, what remained of Germanic studies was characterized by a reaction against nationalism. Archaeological attempts to assign an identity to early Germanic peoples was deliberately avoided. (Note: "Archaeological attempts to assign an identity to the Germani have been consciously avoided since the end of the Second World War.") The uniqueness, common northern origins and antiquity of the early Germanic peoples were called into question. (Note: "Modern approaches to the problem of German origins have to a large extent been governed by shifts in political feeling... In the early 1960s, Germanic origins came under intense examination from linguists as well as archaeologists. Long-held notions about the separateness of the Germans were seriously challenged. The spread of Germanic peoples from a northern heart-land was brought into question and the creation of a Germanic identity was linked with the advance of Roman power to the Rhine and Danube. The reaction against extreme nationalism had gone too far. In the 1980s the pendulum began a backward swing. Once again, arguments which trace the origin of the Germanic peoples to a remote period of European prehistory, to the later Neolithic, are heard... It is possible to accept that the ancestors of the Germans known to our earliest surviving historical accounts can be traced back to the mid-first millennium BCE ...") The movement gained particular momentum during the 1960s. It has been strongly associated with the so-called Vienna School, which is associated with the European Science Foundation and includes prominent members such as Reinhard Wenskus, Walter Pohl, Herwig Wolfram. These scholars employed sociological theories to reject the concept of ethnicity entirely. While Wenskus earlier maintained that the early Germanic peoples held a certain core-tradition (Traditionskern), Pohl has later maintained that early Germanic peoples had no institutions or values of their own, and made no contribution to medieval Europe whatsoever. (Note: "Walter Pohl, had a completely closed mind to any view that admitted that these northern gentes had genuine histories and traditions of their own. Not content to demolish the view that these tribes were essentially racial organizations, they relied on sociological theory that ethnicity is nothing more than a negotiated system of social classification, and that ethnic differences are "situational," to deny these peoples any institutions and values of their own, and so to reduce their contribution to medieval Europe to nothing at all. Such dogmatism is easily explained as a reaction to Nazi racism but it is nevertheless extraordinarily one-sided.") These views are seconded by Wolfram, who states that Germans and Scandinavians "have as much a Germanic history" as "Slavic nations, Greeks, Turks and even the Tunisians and Maltese." Wolf Liebeschuetz has characterized the theories of the Vienna School as "extraordinarily one-sided" and "dogmatism", and its proponents as having "a closed mind". More recently, an even more radical group has emerged, which also employs sociological theories to deconstruct Germanic peoples, while accusing the Vienna School of being "crypto-nationalists". Andrew Gillett has emerged as a leading figure among these scholars. According to them, linguistic evidence and Roman and early Germanic literature is unreliable, while archaeology "cannot be used to distinguish between peoples, and should not be used to trace migration". They state that Germanic culture was entirely derived from the Romans, and that there was therefore "no Germanic contribution to medieval Europe." (Note: "After the 1939–45 war, it was obvious to nearly every one that racialism was not only immoral but also based on pseudo-science. There was a reaction, which resulted among other things in a revision of views about the early Germans... [R]evisionism continues. A younger generation has now appeared, and taken the argument further... They use a sociological model which implies that social groups are infinitely flexible, and can be transformed more or less at will... This view is represented in a series of papers edited by Andrew Gillett and published in 2002. The collection presents a highly intelligent systematic deconstruction of the picture constructed by scholarship since the early 19th century, i.e., criticising even Wenskus and his school as crypto-nationalists. The argument of these, on the whole younger, scholars is that there was no core culture— either of the Germani as a whole, or even of the separate Germanic tribes. They assert that if we know practically nothing about any of these peoples before they entered the Roman empire, that is because they did not know anything themselves... Those 'Germanic' customs which we know the Germans acquired in the empire, and from the Romans. We cannot therefore identify any specifically Germanic contribution to the post-Roman world.") Gillett's theories have been dismissed by Liebeschuetz (Note: "Chapter 6 reviews the debate on the nature of the Germanic tribes that established kingdoms in the provinces of the Empire. It argues that these people did indeed possess both core traditions and a sense of shared identity, and that these had evolved well before their entry into the Roman world.") as "flawed because they depend on a dogmatic and selective use of the evidence" and "very strongly ideological". (Note: ""[C]ontinuous transformation is not incompatible with the possession of core-traditions. The various Germanic tribes possessed such traditions, and these tradition made it possible for these groups to function as effective units, and to survive from generation to generation. Some traditions, especially language, all the tribes had in common... In my opinion the arguments of opponents of the Traditionskern theory are flawed because they depend on a dogmatic and selective use of the evidence... To demolish the view that the Dark Age tribes had an identity based on ethnic core-traditions, the authors of the Gillett volume devote a great deal of energy to disqualifying the scholarship of earlier generations as distorted by mainly nationalist ideology. Yet they show no awareness that their own positions are very strongly ideological, deriving from the rejection of nationalism and the acceptance of multiculturalism, that are conspicuous features of current western values, and which find practical expression, among other things, in the downgrading of national patriotism in the interest of the European ideal.")

In modern times, Malcolm Todd writes, the ideologically motivated theories of the post-war era have lost currency. The origins of the Germanic peoples are again traced to the first millennium BCE, or even the Late Neolithic, in Northern Europe.

== See also ==
- Early Slavs
- Ancient Greece
- Ancient Rome
- Scythians
- Sarmatians

== Sources ==
- Antonsen, Elmer (2002). Runes and Germanic Linguistics. New York and Berlin: Walter de Gruyter. ISBN 978-3-11-017462-5.
- Bauer, Susan Wise (2010). The History of the Medieval World: From the Conversion of Constantine to the First Crusade. New York: W. W. Norton & Company. ISBN 978-0-393-05975-5.
- Bémont, Charles; Monod, Gabriel (2012). Medieval Europe, 395–1270. Lecturable [Kindle Edition]. ASIN B00ASEDPFA.
- Braunmüller, Kurt (2000). "Was ist Germanisch heute?". Sprachwissenschaft. 25: 271–295.
- Buchanan, Robert Angus. "History of Technology: Medieval advance (500–1500 ce)". Encyclopædia Britannica.
- Burns, Thomas (2003). Rome and the Barbarians, 100 B.C.—A.D. 400. Baltimore, MD: Johns Hopkins University Press. ISBN 978-0-8018-7306-5.
- Bury, J. B. (1928). The Invasion of Europe by the Barbarians. New York: W.W. Norton & Company.
- Caesar, Julius (2019). The War for Gaul: A New Translation. Translated by James O'Donnell. Princeton and Oxford: Princeton University Press. ISBN 978-0-69117-492-1.
- Cameron, Averil (1997). "Cult and Worship in East and West". In Leslie Webster; Michelle Brown (eds.). The Transformation of the Roman World, AD 400–900. London: British Museum Press. ISBN 978-0-7141-0585-7.
- Chisholm, Hugh, ed. (1911). "Philology" . Encyclopædia Britannica. Vol. 21 (11th ed.). Cambridge University Press. pp. 414–438. "Classification....1. Indo-European (Indo-Germanic) Family."
- Clay, Cheryl Louise (2008). "Developing the 'Germani' in Roman Studies". Theoretical Roman Archaeology Journal. 1 (2007). Open Library of Humanities: 131–150. doi:10.16995/TRAC2007_131_150.
- Dalby, Andrew (1999). Dictionary of Languages. New York: Columbia University Press. ISBN 978-0-231-11568-1.
- Derry, T.K. (2012). A History of Scandinavia: Norway, Sweden, Denmark, Finland, Iceland. Minneapolis and London: University of Minnesota Press. ISBN 978-0-8166-3799-7.
- Drinkwater, John F. (2007). Alamanni and Rome 213–496: Caracalla to Clovis. Oxford and New York: Oxford University Press. ISBN 978-0-19-929568-5.
- Eliade, Mircea (1984). A History of Religious Ideas (vol. II): From Gautama Buddha to the Triumph of Christianity. Chicago and London: University of Chicago Press. ISBN 0-226-20403-0.
- Ewing, Thor (2008). Gods and Worshippers in the Viking and Germanic World. Stroud, UK: The History Press. ISBN 978-0-7524-3590-9.
- Frassetto, Michael (2003). Encyclopedia of Barbarian Europe: Society in Transformation. Santa Barbara, CA: ABC-CLIO. ISBN 978-1-57607-263-9.
- Geary, Patrick J. (1988). Before France and Germany: The Creation and Transformation of the Merovingian World. Oxford and New York: Oxford University Press. ISBN 978-0-19504-458-4.
- Geary, Patrick J. (1999). "Barbarians and Ethnicity". In G.W. Bowersock; Peter Brown; Oleg Grabar (eds.). Late Antiquity: A Guide to the Postclassical World. Cambridge, Massachusetts: The Belknap Press of Harvard University Press. ISBN 978-0-674-51173-6.
- "Germanic peoples". Encyclopædia Britannica.
- Golther, Wolfgang (1908). Handbuch der Germanischen Mythologie (in German). Stuttgart: Magnus-Verlag.
- Grancsay, Stephen Vincent. "Metalwork: Teutonic Tribes". Encyclopædia Britannica.
- Green, Dennis Howard; Siegmund, Frank (2003). The Continental Saxons from the Migration Period to the Tenth Century: An Ethnographic Perspective. Boydell Press. ISBN 978-1-84383-026-9.
- Halsall, Maureen (1981). The Old English Rune Poem: A Critical Edition. Toronto and Buffalo: University of Toronto Press. ISBN 978-0-8020-5477-7.
- Hachmann, Rolf; Kossack, Georg; Kuhn, Hans (1962). Völker zwischen Germanen und Kelten (in German). Neumünster: K. Wachholtz.
- Haselgrove, Colin; Rebay-Salisbury, Katharina; Wells, Peter S., eds. (22 September 2023). The Oxford Handbook of the European Iron Age. Oxford Handbooks. Oxford University Press. ISBN 9780191019487. "Nowadays it is generally accepted that the first archaeological unit whose population can be considered Germanic with a high degree of certainty is the Jastorf culture, which formed on the lower Elbe and in Mecklenburg at the start of the early Iron Age [...]."
- Heather, Peter (2003). The Visigoths from the Migration Period to the Seventh Century: An Ethnographic Perspective. Rochester, NY: Boydell Press. ISBN 978-1-84383-033-7.
- Herlihy, David (1985). Medieval Households. Cambridge, Massachusetts: Harvard University Press. ISBN 978-0-674-56376-6.
- Innes, M. (2007). Introduction to Early Medieval Western Europe, 300–900. Abingdon.
- Jansen, Christian (2011). "The Formation of German Nationalism, 1740–1850". In Helmut Walser Smith (ed.). The Oxford Handbook of Modern German History. Oxford and New York: Oxford University Press. ISBN 978-0-19-923739-5.
- Kendrick, T.D. (2013) [1930]. A History of the Vikings. New York: Fall River Press. ISBN 978-1-43514-641-9.
- Kiley, Kevin F. (2013). Uniforms of the Roman world.
- Kishlansky, Mark; Geary, Patrick; O'Brien, Patricia (2008). Civilization in the West. New York: Pearson Longman. ISBN 978-0-205-55684-7.
- Kramer, Lloyd; Maza, Sarah (2002). A Companion to Western Historical Thought. Malden, MA: Wiley-Blackwell. ISBN 978-0-631-21714-5.
- Kristinsson, Axel (2010). Expansions: Competition and Conquest in Europe Since the Bronze Age. ReykjavíkurAkademían. ISBN 978-9979992219.
- Levison, Wilhelm (1905). Vitae Sancti Bonifatii archiepiscopi moguntini. Hannover: Hahn Verlag.
- Liebeschuetz, J.H.W.F. (2015). East and West in Late Antiquity: Invasion, Settlement, Ethnogenesis and Conflicts of Religion. BRILL. ISBN 9789004289529.
- MacDowall, Simon (2000). Germanic Warrior 236-568 AD. Bloomsbury USA. ISBN 1841761524.
- Manco, Jean (2013). Ancestral Journeys: The Peopling of Europe from the First Venturers to the Vikings. New York: Thames & Hudson. ISBN 978-0-500-05178-8.
- McGrath, Alister (2015). Christianity: An Introduction. Malden, MA: Wiley-Blackwell. ISBN 978-1-118-46565-3.
- McKitterick, Rosamond (2008). Charlemagne: The Formation of a European Identity. New York: Cambridge University Press. ISBN 978-0-521-71645-1.
- Mjöberg, Johan (1980). "Romanticism and Revival". In David Wilson (ed.). The Northern World. London: Thames and Hudson. ISBN 978-0-500-28430-8.
- Moa, Pius (5 June 2009). "¿Qué legaron los visigodos?" [What were the Visigoths?]. LibertadDigital (in Spanish).
- Moltke, Erik (1985). Runes and Their Origin: Denmark and Elsewhere. Copenhagen: Nationalmuseets Forlag. ISBN 87-480-0578-9.
- Mosse, George (1964). The Crisis of German Ideology: Intellectual Origins of the Third Reich. New York: Grosset & Dunlap. ASIN B000W259Y8.
- Murray, Alexander C. (1983). Germanic Kinship Structure: Studies in Law and Societies in Antiquity and the Early Middle Ages. Toronto: Pontifical Institute of Mediaeval Studies. ISBN 978-0-88844-065-5.
- Musset, Lucien (1993). The Germanic Invasions, the Making of Europe 400–600 AD. New York: Barnes & Noble. ISBN 1-56619-326-5.
- Oliver, Lisi (2011). The Body Legal in Barbarian Law. Toronto: University of Toronto. ISBN 978-0-8020-9706-4.
- Osborne, Roger (2008). Civilization: A New History of the Western World. New York: Pegasus Books. ISBN 978-1-933648-76-7.
- Owen, Francis (1960). The Germanic People. New York: Bookman Associates.
- Oxenstierna, Eric (1967). The World of the Norsemen. Nordgermanen.English. London: Weidenfeld & Nicolson.
- Ostler, Nicholas (2006). Empires of the Word: A Language History of the World. New York: Harper Perennial. ISBN 978-0-06-093572-6.
- Pohl, Walter (1997). "The Barbarian Successor States". In Leslie Webster; Michelle Brown (eds.). The Transformation of the Roman World, AD 400–900. London: British Museum Press. ISBN 978-0-7141-0585-7.
- Ringe, Don (2006). From Proto-Indo-European to Proto-Germanic (PDF). A Linguistic History of English (1st ed.). New York City: Oxford University Press. ISBN 978-0-19-928413-9. OCLC 64554645. OL 7405151M. Wikidata Q131605459.
- Robinson, Orrin (1992). Old English and its Closest Relatives: A Survey of the Earliest Germanic Languages. London: Routledge. ISBN 978-0-8047-1454-9.
- Santosuo, Antonio (2004). Barbarians, Marauders, and Infidels: The Ways of Medieval Warfare. New York: MJF Books. ISBN 978-1-56731-891-3.
- Smith, Woodruff D. (1989). The Ideological Origins of Nazi Imperialism. New York: Oxford University Press. ISBN 978-0-19-504741-7.
- Stein, Peter G.; Glendon, Mary Ann. "Germanic law". Encyclopædia Britannica.
- Stevenson, Walt (n.d.). "Tacitus Germania". University of Richmond.
- Strauss, Gerald (1963). Historian in an Age of Crisis. The Life and Work of Johannes Aventinus, 1477–1534. Cambridge, Massachusetts: Harvard University Press. ASIN B0000CLVQC.
- Tacitus, Cornelius (2009). Agricola and Germany. Translated by Anthony R. Birley. New York: Oxford University Press. ISBN 978-0-19953-926-0.
- Todd, Malcolm (2004). The Early Germans. Blackwell Publishing. ISBN 1-4051-1714-1.
- Turville-Petre, E.O.G; Polomé, Edgar Charles. "Germanic religion and mythology". Encyclopædia Britannica.
- Waldman, Carl; Mason, Catherine (2006). Encyclopedia of European Peoples. New York: Facts on File. ISBN 978-0-8160-4964-6.
- Ward-Perkins, Bryan (2005). The Fall of Rome: And the End of Civilization. New York: Oxford University Press. ISBN 978-0-19-280728-1.
- Wightman, Edith Mary (1985). Gallia Belgica. Berkeley and Los Angeles: University of California Press. ISBN 978-0-520-05297-0.
- Williams, Derek (1998). Romans and Barbarians. New York: St. Martin's Press. ISBN 0-312-19958-9.
- Wilson, Derek (2005). Charlemagne: A Biography. New York: Vintage Books. ISBN 978-0-307-27480-9.
- Winkler, Martin M. (2016). Arminius the Liberator: Myth and Ideology. Oxford University Press. ISBN 978-0190252915.
- Wolfram, Herwig (1997). The Roman Empire and its Germanic Peoples. Berkeley and Los Angeles: University of California Press. ISBN 0-520-08511-6.
- Young, Bruce W. (2008). Family Life in the Age of Shakespeare. Greenwood Press. pp. 16–17.
