= Francis Owen (philologist) =

Canadian philologist (1886–1975)

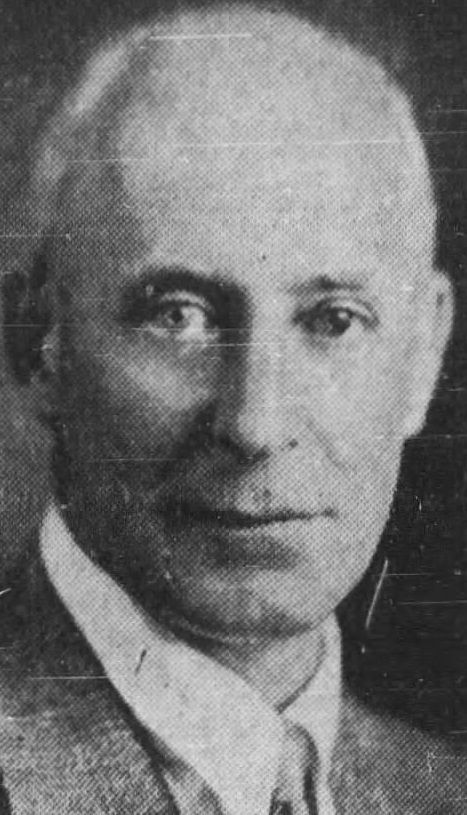
- Born: 6 December 1886; Saltfleet, Ontario, Canada
- Died: 22 December 1975 (aged 89); Edmonton, Alberta, Canada
- Children: 1

Academic background
- Education: University of Toronto; University of Chicago

Academic work
- Discipline: Germanic philology; Indo-European linguistics
- Institutions: University of Alberta
- Main interests: Germanic peoples; Indo-European languages
- Notable works: The Germanic People (1960)

Francis Owen (6 September 1886 − 22 December 1975) was a Canadian philologist and military officer. He was Professor of German and Chairman of the Department of Modern Languages at the University of Alberta, and the author of the first complete scholarly work on the history and early culture of the Germanic peoples. His works on this subject are still cited in modern scholarship.

== Early life and education ==
Francis Owen was born on 6 September 1886 in Saltfleet, Ontario. He earned his bachelor's degree (1907), master's degree (1909) and Education Diploma (1910) from the University of Toronto. In 1907 Owen was the recipient of the Governor General's Medal. He did post-graduate work in Marburg (1908) and Leipzig (1910), and was an instructor in German at Victoria College at the University of Toronto from 1908-1914.

Owen served in World War I as a lieutenant with the 1st Canadian Division and with the 14th Battalion of the 3rd Brigade of the Royal Montreal Regiment. In 1918, he was part of the training staff of the Young Soldiers’ Battalion.

From 1919 to 1920 Owen was a modern language instructor for returned soldiers' preparatory matriculation classes at the university. He joined the University of Alberta in 1920 as a lecturer in German and was an assistant professor of modern languages there from 1925 to 1926. Owen earned his PhD from the University of Chicago in 1926 with a thesis on alliterative verse in Germanic poetry.

== Career ==
After gaining his PhD, Owen served as an associate professor of modern languages at the University of Alberta.

In April 1932 Owen left Canada for Germany to conduct archaeological research. On this trip he worked with Martin Heinrich Gustav Schwantes of the University of Kiel at sites associated with the Pre-Roman Iron Age. While staying in Germany, Owen experienced Adolf Hitler's rise to power at first hand. Returning to Canada in July 1933, he stated that Adolf Hitler had saved Germany from Communism. Owen subsequently advocated a revision of the Treaty of Versailles in favor of Germany.

Following the retirement of John F. Coar, Owen was appointed Professor of German and of Modern Languages at the University of Alberta. As a researcher, he was particularly interested in philology and the Indo-European origins of the Germanic languages. Owen lectured frequently on Indo-European studies and actively worked towards enlightening the students about the various Indo-European language families.

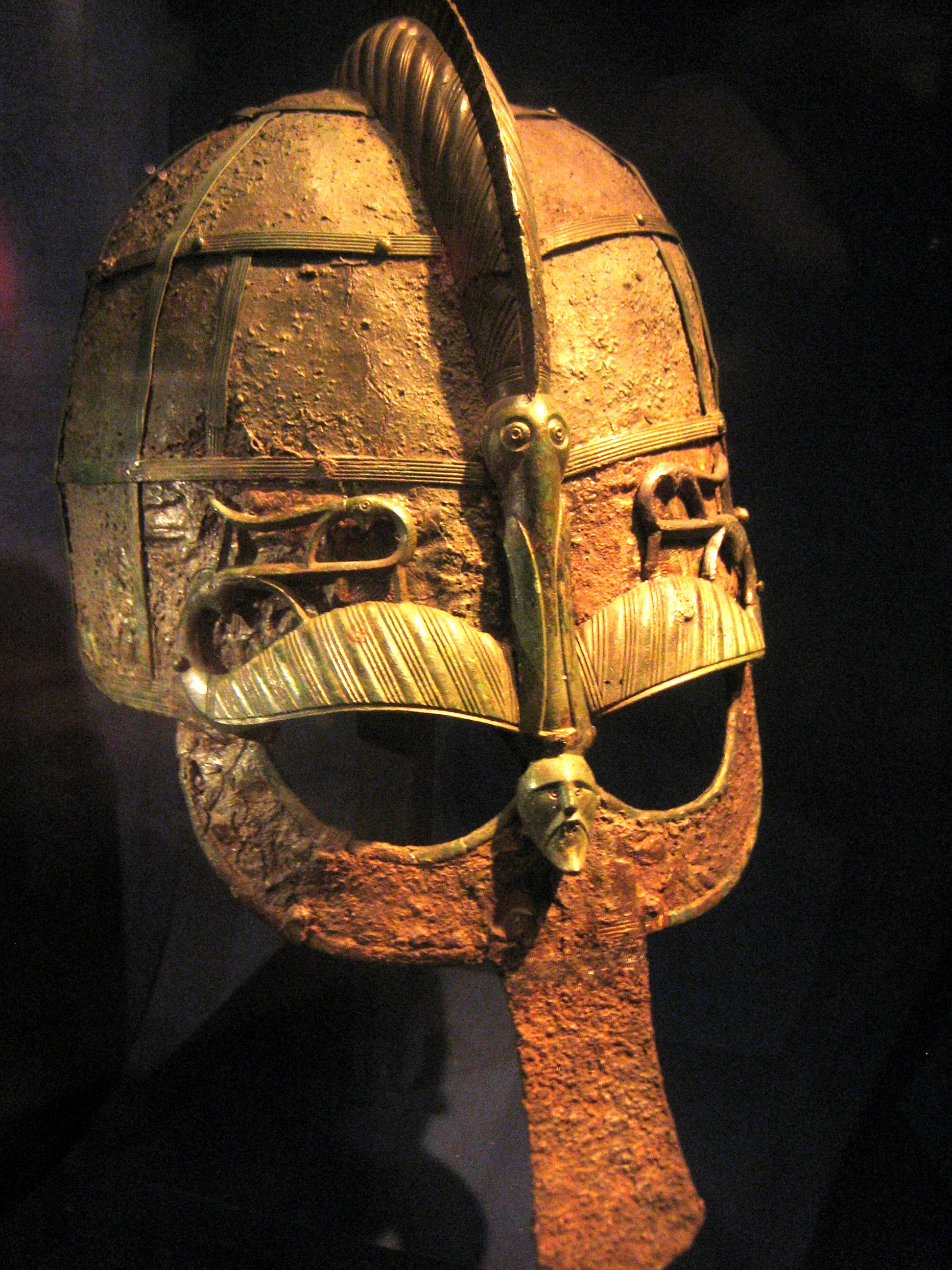
Vendel Period (Germanic Iron Age) helmet at the Swedish Museum of National Antiquities. Researching early Germanic culture and history was one of Owen's greatest scholarly interests.

In April 1936, Owen left on another trip to Europe to conduct archaeological research. Upon his return to Canada in September 1936, he foresaw a coming war between Nazi Germany and the Soviet Union. In 1938, Owen wrote a series of articles for the Edmonton Journal analyzing Mein Kampf, where he predicted that Adolf Hitler would start another world war. As a response to the Nazi threat, he became a strong advocate of preparing Canada and the rest of the British Empire for war. In the spring of 1939, Owen predicted a future alliance between Nazi Germany and the Soviet Union, and became a strong opponent of the policy of appeasement. Once war was declared by the British in September 1939, he supported the war effort wholeheartedly and advocated the complete destruction of the regime of Adolf Hitler, whom he denounced as a "gangster". Owen correctly suspected that the Molotov–Ribbentrop Pact had contained a secret protocol dividing Europe into Nazi and Soviet spheres of influence.

As an opponent of Nazism, Owen led the efforts at the University of Alberta to enlighten students about its dangers. During World War II, he was a major (1940–45) and later served as lieutenant colonel officer-in-command (1945–47) of the University of Alberta Division of the Canadian Officers' Training Corps.

Owen's first wife, Eva Violet, died on 2 January 1945. In August 1945 he married Doris Garrison Stevens, with whom he had a son, William.

From 1947 Owen served as Head of the Department of Modern Languages at the University of Alberta. An expert on Russian affairs, he also taught Russian at the University of Alberta. Owen was a critic of theories of racial supremacy, declaring that "there is no pure ethnic stock anywhere on the face of the earth."

== Later life ==
Owen retired as Professor Emeritus in August 1952. Following his retirement, he settled in Hanover, Germany and dedicated himself to continuing his research on the early history and culture of the Germanic peoples. Owen had been interested in this subject since he was an undergraduate student, and had dedicated much of his free time to researching it since 1928, reading hundreds of books and making numerous research expeditions to countries throughout Europe. Drawing upon a combination of anthropological, archaeological, historical and linguistic evidence, his magnum opus was published in 1960 as The Germanic People. It was the first complete scholarly work on early Germanic history and culture ever published in English. Owen's research on Germanic peoples is still cited in scholarly works such as the Encyclopedia of Indo-European Culture, the Reallexikon der Germanischen Altertumskunde and the Columbia Encyclopedia.

In his later life, Owen published several novels, including The Ravens of Wodan (1962) and Tristan and Isolde (1964).

Owen died in Edmonton, Alberta on 22 December 1975.

== Selected works ==
- The Origin of Alliteration as a Device of Poetic Technique in Germanic Verse. University of Chicago. 1926.
- The Germanic People. Bookman Associates. 1960.
- Attila: The Scourge of God. 1960. OCLC 54774519.
- The Ravens of Wodan. 1962. OCLC 488402116.
- Tristan and Isolde. 1962. OCLC 774535010.
- Pytheas of Marseille. 1965. OCLC 54774496.
- The Story of Beowulf and the Saga of the Kensington Stone. 1966. OCLC 222707771.

== See also ==
- Jan de Vries (philologist)
- Dennis Howard Green
- Hector Munro Chadwick
- Edgar C. Polomé
- Hermann Güntert
- Rudolf Much
- René Derolez
- Gudmund Schütte
- Vilhelm Grønbech
- Rudolf Simek
