= Theodor Möbius =

German philologist

- Born: 22 June 1821; Leipzig, Kingdom of Saxony (now Germany)
- Died: 25 April 1890 (aged 68); Leipzig, Germany

Academic background
- Education: University of Leipzig; University of Berlin

Academic work
- Discipline: Germanic studies
- Sub-discipline: Old Norse studies
- Institutions: University of Leipzig; University of Kiel
- Main interests: Old Norse literature

Theodor Möbius (June 22, 1821 Leipzig - April 25, 1890) was a German philologist who specialized in Germanic studies.

== Biography ==
He was a son of German mathematician August Ferdinand Möbius. He attended the St Nicholas School (Nikolaischule) in Leipzig. Then he studied at the Universities of Leipzig (1840–42) and Berlin (1842-43), receiving his doctorate in 1844 at Leipzig. From 1845 to 1861, he was an assistant, then later curator, at the university library. He earned his habilitation at Leipzig in 1852 with the thesis Über die ältere isländische Saga, and in 1859 became a professor of Scandinavian languages and literature there. In 1865, he accepted a similar position at Kiel. He edited many old Norse works.

== Selected works ==
- Catalogus librorum islandicorum et norvegicorum ætatis mediæ editorum versorum illustratorum : Skáldatal sive Poetarum recensus Eddæ upsaliensis, Lipsiæ : Apud W. Engelmannum, 1856.
- Altnordisches Glossar : wörterbuch zu einer Auswahl alt-isländischer und alt-norwegischer Prosatexte, Leipzig : B.G. Teubner, 1866 – Old Norse glossary: Dictionary of a selection of Old Icelandic and Old Norwegian prose.
- Uber die Altnordische Sprache, Halle, Waisenhaus, 1872 – Old Norse languages.
- Die lieder der Älteren Edda, Paderborn : F. Schöningh, 1876. (Completed after Karl Hildebrand's death (from p. 257) by Möbius).
- Analecta norrœna : Auswahl aus der isländischen und norwegischen Litteratur des Mittelalters, Leipzig : J.C. Hinrichs, second edition 1877 – "Analecta Norröna": Selections from Icelandic and Norwegian literature of the Middle Ages.

== See also ==
- Hugo Gering
- Eugen Mogk
- Andreas Heusler
