= Karl Helm =

German philologist (1871–1960)

- Born: 19 May 1871; Karlsruhe, German Empire
- Died: 9 September 1960 (aged 89); Marburg, West Germany

Academic background
- Education: University of Heidelberg
- Doctoral advisor: Wilhelm Braune
- Other advisor: Hermann Paul

Academic work
- Discipline: Germanic studies
- Institutions: University of Giessen; University of Würzburg; Goethe University Frankfurt; University of Marburg
- Notable students: Jost Trier; Hans Kuhn; Eduard Neumann; Nechama Leibowitz
- Main interests: Germanic folklore; Germanic linguistics; Germanic religion

Karl Helm (full name Karl Hermann Georg Helm; 19 May 1871 in Karlsruhe – 9 September 1960 in Marburg) was a German philologist who specialized in Germanic studies.

== Biography ==
Karl Helm was born in Karlsruhe, Germany on 19 May 1871. He studied German philology at the universities of Heidelberg and Freiburg and received his doctorate in 1895 with a dissertation on 16th-century poetry.

He completed his habilitation on the literature of the Teutonic Order, which was published in Giessen in 1899. After teaching in Giessen, Würzburg and Frankfurt, he was appointed professor of early Germanic philology at the University of Marburg in 1921.

Helm took over editorship of the Althochdeutsche Grammatik, Althochdeutsches Lesebuch and Gotische Grammatik from Wilhelm Braune, all standard works in Germanic studies. His own research focused on Middle High German, Old High German, Germanic folklore and religion. students of Helm include Karl Bischoff, Ernst Albrecht Ebbinghaus, Hans Kuhn, Nechama Leibowitz, Eduard Neumann and Jost Trier.

Helm adhered to a national conservative ideology throughout his life, expressing sympathy for the German National People's Party (without however becoming a regular member). He was a member of the Militant League for German Culture from 1933, but he never became a member of the Nazi party. In November 1933 Helm signed the Vow of allegiance of the Professors of the German Universities and High-Schools to Adolf Hitler and the National Socialistic State.

Helm retired from Marburg as professor emeritus in 1936, but continued hold lectures there until 1958. He died in Marburg on 9 September 1960.

== Selected works ==
- Zur Rhythmik der kurzen Reimpaare des 16. Jahrhunderts, 1895
- (Publisher) Das Evangelium Nicodemi, 1902
- (Publisher) Dichtungen des Deutschen Ordens. 1: Die Apokalypse Heinrichs von Hesler: aus der Danziger Handschrift, 1907
- Altgermanische Religionsgeschichte, 1913
- Altgermanische Religionsgeschichte. 2: Die nachrömische Zeit; Teil 1: Die Ostgermanen, 1937
- Die Literatur des Deutschen Ritterordens, 1951
- Altgermanische Religionsgeschichte. 2: Die nachrömische Zeit; Teil 2: Die Westgermanen, 1953

== See also ==
- Rudolf Much
- Andreas Heusler
- Eugen Mogk
- Otto Höfler

== Sources ==
- Peter Wengel: Karl Helm. In: Internationales Germanistenlexikon 1800-1950, eds. König, Wägenbaur, Frindt, vol. 1, Walter de Gruyter, Berlin – New York 2003. ISBN 3110154854.
- Bernhard Maier: Karl Helm, In: Heinrich Beck, Dieter Geuenich, Heiko Steuer (eds.): Reallexikon der Germanischen Altertumskunde, vol.14, Berlin – New York 1999, ISBN 3-11-016423-X
- Ludwig Wolff (1969). "Helm, Karl". Neue Deutsche Biographie (in German). Vol. 8. Berlin: Duncker & Humblot. pp. 491–492. (full text online).
- Deutsche Biographische Enzyklopädie, 1996. ISBN 3-598-23160-1
