= Otto Sigfrid Reuter =

German writer and organiser (1876–1945)

Otto Sigfrid Reuter (2 September 1876 – 5 April 1945) was a German writer and organiser who was central in the neopagan current within the völkisch movement. He had a career in telecommunications and began his völkisch-religious activities with the 1910 pamphlet Sigfrid oder Christus?! He founded some of the earliest organisations for Germanic neopaganism, which adhered to the racial ideologies of the völkisch movement. Reuter promoted a decentralised version of pagan practice without priests, in contrast to the hierarchically structured Germanic Faith Community of Ludwig Fahrenkrog. Reuter's theories have been described as parascientific. His major theoretical work Germanische Himmelskunde (1934) is about the Germanic star map.

== Early life and career ==
Otto Theodor Ludwig Sigfrid Reuter was born on 2 September 1876 in Leer, East Frisia. His father Wilhelm Reuter was a merchant captain and director of the naval school in Leer. His mother Emma was the daughter of the pastor and theologian Friedrich Armknecht. Reuter was a half brother of Ernst Reuter who became the Governing Mayor of Berlin.

After passing his Reifeprüfung in Leer in 1894, Reuter worked as a telegraphist in Oldenburg, Cologne and Bonn. From 1901 he studied history and law in Bonn. Having passed a Verwaltungsprüfung in 1905, he worked in Berlin and Elberfeld, and from 1917 in Bremen as a telegraph director and head of the telephone system. His career in telecommunications ended in 1924 due to staff reductions and his activities as a völkisch agitator.

== Völkisch-religious activities ==
In 1910, Reuter published the pamphlet Sigfrid oder Christus?! (lit. 'Sigfrid or Christ?!') where he argued that Christianity is alien to the Germans and promoted a renewal of pre-Christian Germanic religiosity. He held Sigfrid from Germanic heroic legend as a role model and contrasted him with Jesus, who "wanted us to win victory through suffering and endurance", writing that "our religion is that of the champion of light, who finds joy in action and fights his way to peace through victory. That is the language of Sigfrid." The pamphlet was well received within the pagan-leaning faction of the emerging völkisch-religious movement. It was initially published anonymously with the subtitle Von einem Deutschen (lit. 'By a German'), a reference to Julius Langbehn's Rembrandt als Erzieher (1890) which used the same wording. A second edition in 1910 was published under Reuter's name.

Reuter's activities became tied to two organisations he founded in 1911: the Deutscher Orden (lit. 'German Order') and the Deutschreligiösen Gemeinschaft (lit. 'German-religious Community'). They were among the earliest formally organised groups within Germanic neopaganism and tied to the racial ideologies of the völkisch movement. Members were required to show an Aryan certificate provided by Bernhard Koerner, editor of the Deutsches Geschlechterbuch. The Deutschreligiösen Gemeinschaf, renamed Deutschgläubige Gemeinschaft (lit. 'German-believing Community') in 1914, functioned as an inner circle and was only open for members who formally had left the Christian church.

Reuter's group was contemporaneous with the Germanic Faith Community of Ludwig Fahrenkrog. They were to some extent competitors but also had mutual members. A major difference was Reuter's promotion of a decentralised pagan practice, without priests and formalised rituals, in contrast to Fahrenkrog's preference for a hierarchical organisational structure. Several short-lived attempts were made to unify the early Germanic neopagans in an umbrella organisation. A notable example was the Nordische Glaubensgemeinschaft (lit. 'Nordic Belief Community'), which was founded by Reuter and Norbert Seibertz in 1927 but was dissolved in 1928 when the co-founders fell out. Reuter's own organisations were dissolved in 1933. He was involved in the establishment of the German Faith Movement of Jakob Wilhelm Hauer.

Within the völkisch-religious movement, Reuter's primary contributions were as a theoretician. Especially after his professional career, he conducted research into Germanic subjects, held contact with the scholars Gustav Neckel and Gustaf Kossinna, and formulated a foundation for the movement's worldview which the historian Uwe Puschner describes as parascientific. Reuter's most ambitious work was the book Germanische Himmelskunde (lit. 'Germanic Astronomy'), published in 1934 with support from the Notgemeinschaft der Deutschen Wissenschaft. Taking inspiration from Kossinna's work on astronomy and mythology, Reuter argued for the existence of an advanced and specifically Germanic star map.

Reuter was a member of the Deutsche Gesellschaft für Vorgeschichte from 1922 and received its Gustaf-Kossinna-Preis in 1936. In 1938 he was made an honorary member of the Bremer Wissenschaftliche Gesellschaft. He received an honorary doctorate from the Leipzig University in 1939 through the support of scholars such as Franz Josef Hopmann, Otto Reche, Konstantin Reichardt and Kurt Tackenberg. He became a member of the Nazi Party in 1939 and was in contact with the Ahnenerbe. Puschner, a historian who specialises in the völkisch movement, describes Reuter as a major ideologue of the pagan faction within the völkisch-religious current, with continuing impact in contemporary times, and as one of the many who contributed to an ideologisation of science through his ability to create a bridge between a scientific and a völkisch worldview.

== Personal life ==
Reuter married his wife Gertrud in 1923. They had two sons and one daughter. He died in Bremen's Huchting district in a bomb raid on 5 April 1945.

== Publications ==
Bibliography adapted from the Neue Deutsche Biographie

- Heilwig Rennenberg, Schauspiel in vier Aufzügen, 1905.
- Hero Onkens Ausfahrt und Heimkehr, 1909.
- Sigfrid oder Christus?! Kampfruf an die germanischen Völker zur Jahrtausendwende. Von einem Deutschen, 1910. Anonymous.
- Das Rätsel der Edda und der arische Urglaube (2 volumes), 1921–1923.
- Aus arischer Vorzeit, 1925.
- Germanische Himmelskunde. Untersuchungen zur Geschichte des Geistes, 1934.
- Der Himmel über den Germanen, 1936; in English 1982 as Skylore of the North.
- Gestalten und Gedanken im Nibelungenlied, 1979.
