= Karl Hildebrand =

German philologist

- Born: 2 December 1846; Arnstadt, Germany
- Died: 17 April 1875 (aged 28); Leipzig, Germany

Academic background
- Education: University of Leipzig
- Academic advisor: Friedrich Karl Theodor Zarncke

Academic work
- Discipline: Germanic studies
- Sub-discipline: Old Norse studies
- Institutions: University of Halle
- Main interests: Old Norse literature

Karl Hildebrand (2 December 1846, in Arnstadt – 17 April 1875, in Halle an der Saale) was a German philologist who specialized in Old Icelandic literature.

== Biography ==
Hildebrand studied history and philology at the University of Leipzig, where he was a pupil of Friedrich Karl Theodor Zarncke. In 1871 he earned his PhD at Leipzig with a thesis titled, Über die Conditionalsätze und ihre Conjunctionen in der älteren Edda. In 1873 he qualified as a lecturer of German philology at the University of Halle with the thesis, Versteilung in den Eddaliedern.

His best written effort was an edition of Die lieder der Älteren Edda (Sæmundar Edda). Unfinished at the time of Hildebrand's death in 1875 (age 28), it was completed by Theodor Möbius (from page 257) during the following year.

== See also ==
- Andreas Heusler
- Rudolf Much
- Eugen Mogk
