= Eduard Neumann =

Eduard Neumann may refer to:

- Eduard Neumann (philologist) (1903–1985), German philologist
- Eduard Neumann (fighter pilot) (1911-2004), German fighter pilot
