= Rankenheim =

Coordinates: 52°9′51″N 13°37′57″E

Rankenheim is a mansion on Zemminsee in Groß Köris, Brandenburg, approx. 50 kilometres south of Berlin. In Nazi Germany it was used as a camp for educating teachers. After 1945 it became a temporary hospital and eventually a place for "maladjusted children" during the GDR regime - it is now a youth village. The surrounding district of Groß Köris is called Rankenheim.

== History ==
Friedrich Wilhelm Ranke was a Prussian councillor, brother of the historian Leopold von Ranke. Since 1843 he bought in Groß Köris and neighbouring communities land where he built a brick factory and a bakery et al. and cut peat. In 1865 he built on a parcel of 15 hectare on the banks of Zemminsee a mansion, stables and outbuildings. After Ranke's death on 16 June 1871, the property was transferred to a community of heirs, who sold it. After several changes of ownership of Rankenheim fell to Dresdner Bank.

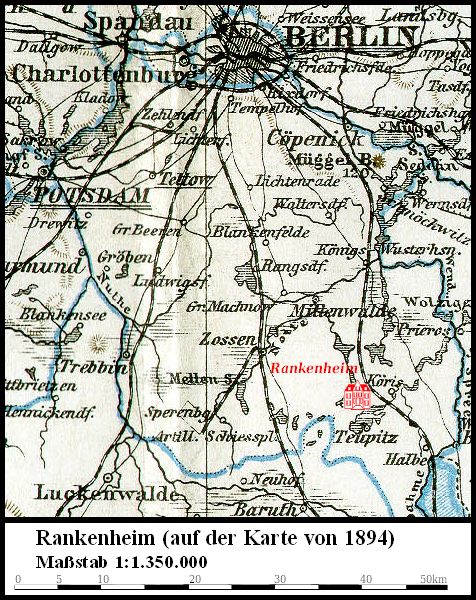
Rankenheim on a map from Brockhaus, 1894

== Third Reich era ==
Dresdner Bank transferred Rankenheim 1935 to the "Jubilee Foundation for Education" which repurposed Rankenheim as a training camp for the "Central Institute of Education". Initially, the Institute carried out so-called 'National Political Courses' for students, as they were carried out in many places in Germany in camp school for indoctrination and disciplining of youth. Everyday life in the camps "was strictly regulated and followed - as with all forms of Nazi camp education. A detailed service plan in which military training and ideological indoctrination played a prominent role."

The same time Rankenheim served as a "Reichs seat for teacher instruction" of the Central Institute, that conducted teacher training camps on behalf of the Nazi Ministry of Education. The first of these camps took place in October 1935 under the direction of Hans Reinerth and Alfred Pudelko. In other camps, among others Rudolf Benze and Bernhard Kummer contributed their racist ideas, but also well known lecturers like the Indo-Germanist Kurt Stegmann of Pritzwald gave lectures here.

In the beginning these camps were also held in the Western German Essen-Kettwig. When Germany started the war Rankenheim became the only place for teacher camps. The aim of these camps was to retrain all teachers to the National Socialist education ideology and to reorganize of the school system. 80-100 teachers from all over Germany were trained in several days (usually eight days) events with appeals, fatigue duty, sport, marches (or excursions) and (relatively short) lectures. Topics were such as "military training in math and science classes" whose goal was summarized as follows: "It is always important to focus the students - according to their age and their kind - on the important things for the life and the self-assertion of the German people in his small lebensraum and thereby evoke their joyful willingness to full commitment to the maintenance of German soil and life."

From autumn 1941 the Prague branch of the Central Institute organized the retraining of Czech teachers who were also (with a higher proportion of ethnic-racist lectures) performed in teacher camps in Rankenheim.

Due to the war in August 1943, the library and the archives of the Central Institute were moved to Rankenheim, this included the entire stock of the orthopaedagogy archive Berlin. From February 13, 1945 Rankenheim was officially the "main office" of the Central Institute, even if the operation was practically deadlocked and was passed from the apartment of Rudolf Benze in Potsdam.

In these training camps a very large number of teachers were indoctrinated: until 1941 10.000 teachers had been retrained in over 150 camps.

At the end of war Rankenheim was temporary a hospital. After the liberation from National Socialist dictatorship an orphanage was established in 1945; Rankenheim been operated since 1947 by the government as the state protectory with 100 beds. The documents of the Central Institute were evacuated and mostly burned.

== GDR-Era ==
From 1952 "maladjusted" boys were housed in Rankenheim. The characterization of the home was transformed in the following period in the documents several times of "special home", "auxiliary boarding school" and "home for maladjusted, formable moronic children". The capacity was 75 places, the competent institution was the administrative district Königs Wusterhausen.

In November 1965, Rankenheim was incorporated in the "Kombinat der Sonderheime für Psychodiagnostik und pädagogisch-psychologische Therapie" (combine of the special homes for psychodiagnostics and pedagogical-psychological therapy) as a special home for "maladjusted" "auxiliary pupils" or those with or with a "behavioural disorder". There were housed up to 72 boys aged 7 to 15 years old in six groups, each group corresponded to a school class. The schooling took place in the group rooms. 1979 a school was also built with a gymnasium in Rankenheim. Important therapeutic agent was focused on the milieu: "the influence of external circumstances at the home and the daily routine of the children in care".

In 1988 the Combine was transformed in the "Pedagogical Medical Centre" (PMZ). Rankenheim became an institution of the Bezirk Potsdam.

== Die Wende ==
After the end of GDR Rankenheim was subordinated to the Ministry of Education, Youth and Sport Brandenburg as well as the other former facilities of the Combine. The Ministry reinstated 1992 the "Foundation Great Orphanage Potsdam", with the task of reorganizing the sponsorship for these facilities. For this purpose, the Foundation in 1994 founded the "GFB-gemeinnützige Gesellschaft zur Förderung Brandenburger Kinder und Jugendlicher mbH" (Charitable Society for the Promotion of Children and Adolescents in Brandenburg Ltd.), which took over the sponsorship of eight institutions including Rankenheim.

Rankenheim was rebuilt and conceptually reorganized and persists as a children and youth village under the law of German child and youth services. Today besides of 33 home places in Rankenheim there is an office of the foster children service and a public school.
