= Elmer H. Antonsen =

German philologist (1929–2008)

- Born: 17 November 1929; Glens Falls, New York
- Died: 25 August 2008 (aged 78); Urbana, Illinois

Academic background
- Education: Union College (B.A.); University of Illinois Urbana-Champaign (M.A., Ph.D.)
- Thesis: The Investigation of I-Mutation in the Germanic Languages
- Doctoral advisor: Ernst Alfred Philippson

Academic work
- Discipline: Germanic philology
- Sub-discipline: Scandinavian studies
- Institutions: University of Illinois at Urbana–Champaign
- Main interests: Runology; German Phonology

Elmer H. Antonsen (17 November 1929 – 25 August 2008) was an American philologist who specialized in Germanic studies. Antonsen was born in Glens Falls, New York on 17 November 1929 to Haakon Jharl and Astrid Amelia (Sommer) Antonsen. He earned degrees in German at Union College where he took the B.A. degree, and then at University of Illinois at Urbana–Champaign where he studied under Ernst Alfred Philippson for his doctorate. He taught German Studies, Germanic Philology and Germanic Linguistics at the University of Iowa in the 1960s before moving back to the University of Illinois in 1967 to rise to Full Professor three years later. Antonsen served as Head of the department of Germanic languages and literatures from 1973 - 1982 and of the department of linguistics from 1990 - 1992. He was visiting professor at the University of North Carolina at Chapel Hill in 1972-73 and at University of Göttingen in 1988. His research and publications focused on historical and structural linguistics. He was a known expert on runology. He retired in 1996, and was awarded professor emeritus status.

Antonsen died in Urbana, Illinois on 25 August 2008.

== Selected works ==
- A Concise Grammar of the Older Runic Inscriptions, (Max Niemeyer Verlag, Tübingen 1975)
- German Linguistics II. Papers from the Second Symposium on Germanic Linguistics. University of Illinois (October 3–4, 1986). Antonsen, Elmer H., & Hans Henrich Hock, eds. Urbana, U IL Pr, 1988.
- The Grimm Brothers and the Germanic Past, Antonsen, Elmer, James W. Marchand and Ladislav Zgusta (eds.), (John Benjamins, Amsterdam 1990)
- STAEFCRAEFT: Studies in Germanic Linguistics, Antonsen & Hock (eds.), (John Benjamins, Amsterdam 1991)
- Runes and Germanic Linguistics, (Mouton de Gruyter, Berlin/New York 2002)
- Elements of German: Phonology and Morphology, (University of Alabama Press, Tuscaloosa 2007)

== Sources ==
- Bernard Mees: "Elmer Antonsen as a Runologist." In: Mindy MacLeod, Marco Bianchi, Henrik Williams (Hrsg.): Reading Runes: Proceedings of the Eighth International Symposium on Runes and Runic Inscriptions, Nyköping, Sweden, 2–6 September 2014. Institutionen för nordiska språk vid Uppsala universitet, Uppsala 2021, 109–124. <http://www.diva-portal.org/smash/get/diva2:1540869/FULLTEXT01.pdf>
- Wilfried Kürschner: Elmer H. Antonsen. In: Linguistenhandbuch A–L, Günter Narr Verlag, Tübingen 1997, ISBN 3-8233-5001-3, S. 15f. with a photo
