= Hans Kuhn (philologist) =

German philologist (1899–1988)

- Born: 13 July 1899; Minden, Germany
- Died: 8 October 1988 (aged 89); Kiel, Germany

Academic background
- Education: University of Münster
- Academic advisor: Karl Helm
- Influences: Jan de Vries

Academic work
- Discipline: Germanic philology
- Sub-discipline: Nordic philology
- Institutions: University of Münster; University of Leipzig; University of Berlin; University of Kiel
- Notable students: Klaus von See; Dietrich Hofmann
- Main interests: Old Norse literature; Toponymy
- Notable works: Völker zwischen Germanen und Kelten (1962)
- Notable ideas: Nordwestblock

Hans Kuhn (13 July 1899 – 8 October 1988) was a German philologist who specialized in Germanic studies. He was Professor of Nordic philology at the University of Kiel.

== Biography ==
Hans Kuhn was born in Minden, Germany on 13 July 1899. After gaining his PhD, Kuhn initially worked as a high school teacher. He completed his habilitation under the supervision of Karl Helm in 1931 at the University of Marburg, where he subsequently lectured for several years.

Kuhn was a professor at the University of Leipzig from 1938 to 1941, and a professor at the University of Berlin from 1941 to 1946. He was elected a Member of the Prussian Academy of Sciences in 1943.

From 1946 to 1964, Kuhn was Professor of Nordic Philology at the University of Kiel. In 1959, Kuhn gained much attention for his proposal that there existed a Nordwestblock in the area around the lower Rhine in the Iron Age, which was neither Celtic or Germanic. He was also the author of numerous works on Old Norse literature. Prominent students of Kuhn at the University of Kiel include Klaus von See and Dietrich Hofmann.

== Selected works ==
- Das Füllwort of-um im Altwestnordischen, 1929
- Island. Das Heimatland der Sagas, 1935
- Vor- und frühgermanische Ortsnamen in Norddeutschland und den Niederlanden, 1959
- (with Rolf Hachmann and Georg Kossack): Völker zwischen Germanen und Kelten, 1962
- Grenzen vor- und frühgeschichtlicher Ortsnamentypen, 1963
- Kleine Schriften, 1969-1978
- Das alte Island, 1971
- Das Dróttkvætt, 1983
- Das altnordische Seekriegswesen, 1991

== See also ==
- Andreas Heusler

== Sources ==
- Deutsche Biographische Enzyklopädie. Vol. 6: K. Saur, München 1997, ISBN 3-598-23166-0.
- Wolfgang Meid: Hans Kuhns „Nordwestblock“-Hypothese. Zur Problematik der „Völker zwischen Germanen und Kelten“. In: Heinrich Beck (Hrsg.): Germanenprobleme in heutiger Sicht. de Gruyter, Berlin u. a. 1986, ISBN 3-11-010806-2, S. 183–212
- "Prof. Dr. phil. Johann Bernhard Christoph Theodor Kuhn". University of Leipzig (in German).
