= Kluge's law =

Controversial Germanic sound law

Kluge's law is a controversial Proto-Germanic sound law formulated by Friedrich Kluge. It purports to explain the origin of the Proto-Germanic long consonants *kk, *tt, and *pp (Proto-Indo-European lacked a phonemic length distinction for consonants) as originating in the assimilation of *n to a preceding voiced plosive consonant, under the condition that the *n was part of a suffix which was stressed in the ancestral Proto-Indo-European (PIE). The name "Kluge's law" was coined by Friedrich Kauffmann and revived by Frederik Kortlandt. As of 2006, the law was not generally accepted by historical linguists.

The resulting long consonants would subsequently have been shortened, except when they followed a short vowel; this is uncontroversial for *ss (which has a different origin). Proponents of Kluge's law use this to explain why so many Proto-Germanic roots (especially of strong verbs) end in short *p, *t, or *k even though their likely cognates in other Indo-European languages point to final Proto-Indo-European consonants other than the expected *b, *d, *g, or *ǵ. (Indeed, non-Germanic evidence for Proto-Indo-European *b is so rare that *b may not have been a phoneme at all; yet, in Proto-Germanic, *p was rare only at the beginnings of words.)

Much like Verner's law, Kluge's law would have created many consonant alternations in the grammatical paradigm of a word that were becoming only partially predictable. Analogical simplifications of these complexities are proposed as an explanation for the many cases where closely related (often otherwise identical) words point to short, long, plosive, fricative, voiceless or voiced Proto-Germanic consonants in closely related Germanic languages or dialects, even sometimes the same dialect.

== Assimilation (Kluge's law proper) ==
The origin of Proto-Germanic (PGmc) *ll, *rr, *nn, and *mm had already been explained in Kluge's time as resulting from the assimilation of consonant clusters across earlier morpheme boundaries: *ll from earlier (Pre-Germanic) *l-n, *rr from earlier *r-n, *nn from earlier *n-n and *n-w, *mm from earlier *z-m and *n-m. This is uncontroversial today, except that *r-n may not have given *rr in every case. A few examples with *-n are:

- PGmc *fullaz < PIE *pl̥h₁-nó-s > Sanskrit pūrṇá- (all meaning "full")
- PGmc *wullō- < PIE *h₂wl̥h₂-neh₂- > Sanskrit ūrṇā- (all meaning "wool")
- PGmc *ferrai ("far") < PIE *perH-noi > Lithuanian pérnai ("last year")
- German Welle, Old High German wella < PIE *wel-neh₂- (e-grade); Russian волна /volˈna/ < PIE *wl̥-neh₂- (zero-grade) (all meaning "wave")

Kluge proposed to explain *pp, *tt, and *kk the same way (examples cited after Kroonen):

- PGmc *lappōn- < PIE *lHbʰ-néh₂- > Latin lambō (all meaning "to lick")
- Middle Dutch roppen, Middle High German and later rupfen (both "to pluck, tear off") < PIE *Hrup-néh₂- > Latin rumpō ("I break")
- PGmc *buttaz (genitive singular) < PIE *bʰudʰ-no- > Sanskrit budʰná-, Latin fundus (all meaning "bottom")
- PGmc *stuttōn- < PIE *(s)tud-n- > Latin tundō (all meaning "to bump into something")
- PGmc *likkōn- < PIE *liǵʰ-n- > Ancient Greek λιχνεύω [likʰˈneu̯ɔː], Latin lingō (all meaning "to lick")
- PGmc *þakkōn- "to pat" < PIE *th₂g-n- > Latin tangō "I touch"

Without Kluge's law, **-bn-, **-pn-, **-dn-, **-tn-, **-gn-, and **-kn- would be expected, respectively, in the Germanic forms (according to Grimm's law and Verner's law).

== Predictable exceptions ==
Kluge's law did not operate behind stressed vowels, only in the same environment as Verner's law. Examples cited are after Kroonen:

- PGmc *ufna- ("oven") < PIE *úp-no-
- PGmc *tafna- ("sacrifice", "meal") < PIE *dh₂p-no- > Latin damnum ("detriment"), Ancient Greek δαπάνη [daˈpanɛː] ("expenditure")
- PGmc *swefna- < PIE *swép-no- > Sanskrit svápna-, Latin somnus (all "sleep", "dream")
- PGmc *aþna- < PIE *h₂ét-no- > Latin annus (all "year")
- PGmc *watn- < PIE *wéd-n- ("water"; *-r- in the nominative, *-n- in the genitive) > Latin unda ("wave", "[mass of] water")
- PGmc *laihna- ("borrowed goods") < PIE *lóikʷ-no- > Sanskrit rékṇas- ("inheritance", "wealth")
- PGmc *wagna- < PIE *wóǵʰ-no- ("wagon")

Also, even when that condition was fulfilled, Kluge's law did not act on the descendants of Proto-Indo-European *s (Proto-Germanic *z following Verner's law). Examples cited after Kroonen:

- PGmc *razna- ("house") < PIE *Hros-nó-
- PGmc *twizna- ("double thread") < PIE *dwis-nó-
- PGmc *liznōn- ("to learn") < PIE *lis-néh₂- ("to make oneself know", a mediopassive causative)
- PGmc *aznō- ("work") < PIE *h₂es-néh₂-
- PGmc genitive singular *uhsniz, genitive plural *uhsnǫ̂, accusative plural *uhsnunz < PIE *uks-n-és, *uks-n-óHom, *uks-én-n̥s ("ox's, oxen's, oxen")

== Shortening of long consonants in overlong syllables ==
The rise of long consonant phonemes left the Pre-Germanic language with three kinds of syllables:

1. short: with a short vowel, followed by a short consonant in the next syllable
2. long: with a long vowel, a diphthong or a short vowel + *l/*m/*n/*r, followed by a short consonant in the next syllable
  or a short vowel followed by a long consonant that spanned the syllable boundary
3. overlong: with a long vowel, a diphthong or a short vowel + *l/*m/*n/*r followed by a long consonant that spanned the syllable boundary

In other words, syllables could be long because of the specific vowel (or a following *l/*m/*n/*r), or because a long consonant from the next syllable bled in. If both occurred, the syllable was overlong. See Mora (linguistics), which suggests that such overlong syllables are cross-linguistically rare.

All overlong syllables were then turned into long syllables by shortening the long consonant. This is uncontroversial for *ss, which derives from Proto-Indo-European *t-t, *d-t and *dʰ-t clusters across morpheme boundaries (which were probably pronounced [tst] in Proto-Indo-European):

- Without shortening (short vowel followed by long consonant): PGmc *wissaz "certain" < PIE *wid-tó-s "known"
- With shortening (long vowel followed by originally long consonant): PGmc *wīsa- "wise" < PIE *weid-tó- > Latin vīsus "seen"
- With shortening (diphthong followed by originally long consonant): PGmc *haisiz "command" < PIE *káid-tis "act of calling"

Kluge proposed to extend this explanation to cases where Proto-Germanic roots that constituted long syllables ended in *p, *t, or *k, while different consonants at the same places of articulation would be expected based on apparently related roots (in Proto-Germanic or other Indo-European branches). Examples cited after Kroonen:

- PGmc *deupa- ("deep") as if from PIE *-b-; Lithuanian dubùs ("deep", "hollow") from PIE *-bʰ-
- PGmc *skēpa- ("sheep"), but *skaban- ("to scrape/shear/shave")
- PGmc *hwīta- as if from PIE *-d-; Sanskrit śvetá-, śvítna- from PIE *-t- (all meaning "white")
- PGmc *wantu- ("glove/mitten"), but *windan- ("to wind")
- PGmc *dīka- ("dam/dike", "pool") as if from PIE *-g- or *-ǵ-; Ancient Greek τεῖχος [ˈtêːkʰɔs] ("wall") from PIE *-gʰ- or *-ǵʰ-
- PGmc *taikjan- as if from PIE *-g- or *-ǵ-; Ancient Greek δείκνῡμι [ˈděːknyːmi] from PIE *-k- or *-ḱ- (all meaning "to show")

== Consequences for Proto-Germanic morphology ==
Kluge's law had a noticeable effect on Proto-Germanic morphology. Because of its dependence on ablaut and accent, it operated in some parts of declension and conjugation, but not in others, giving rise to alternations of short and long consonants in both nominal and verbal paradigms. Kroonen compared these alternations to grammatischer Wechsel (the alternation of voiced and voiceless fricatives in Proto-Germanic, caused by Verner's law) and especially to the consonant gradation of the neighboring Finnic and Sami languages. This is most conspicuous in the n-stem nouns and the "néh₂-presents" (imperfective verbs formed from perfective ones by adding the Proto-Indo-European suffix *néh₂-/*nh₂-), but also occurs in mn-stems and directional adverbs.

=== n-stem nouns ===
Kluge's law created long consonants in the genitive singular, which ended in *-n-és in Proto-Indo-European, and in the genitive plural (*-n-óHom). It did not operate in the dative plural: although the *n of *-n̥-mis was in direct contact with the root in Proto-Indo-European, it was syllabic, so it became *-un- early on the way to Proto-Germanic (soon assimilated to *-ummiz), preventing the operation of Kluge's law.

Schematic (after Kroonen), where C represents the initial and the final consonant of the root, and G represents its Verner variant if it had one:

n-stem paradigm	PIE	PGmc
nominative sg.	C_́C-ō	C_C-ô
genitive sg.	C_C-n-és	C_CC-iz
locative > dative sg.	C_C-én-i	C_G-ini
accusative sg.	C_C-ón-m̥	C_G-anų
nominative pl.	C_C-ón-es	C_G-aniz
genitive pl.	C_C-n-óHom	C_CC-ǫ̂
dative pl.	C_́C-n̥-mis	C_C-ummiz
accusative pl.	C_C-on-n̥s	C_G-unz

Example:

"fever"	PIE	PGmc
nominative sg.	*kréyt-ō	*hrīþô
genitive sg.	*krit-n-és	*hrittiz
locative > dative sg.	*krit-én-i	*hridini
accusative sg.	*krit-ón-m̥	*hridanų

Naturally, this led to three different kinds of consonant alternation (examples after Kroonen):

	friction + voice + length	friction + length	length only	
nominative sg.	*tōgô	*rīhô	*wekô	*sterô
genitive sg.	*takkiz	*rikkiz	*wukkiz	*sturriz
Meaning	twig/branch, prong	stringing pole, line	wick	infertile animal

The nominative singular of roots ending in plosives thus became difficult to predict from the cases where Kluge's law had operated; and the pure length opposition was more common than the others, because it was not limited to plosives.

=== mn-stem nouns ===
In Proto-Indo-European, such words regularly would have had a nominative singular in *-mḗn and a genitive in *-mn-és. However, in the genitive singular, it appears that the *-m- dropped out of the middle of the resulting three-consonant cluster already in PIE, making the mn-stems look like n-stems: Proto-Indo-European *bʰudʰ-mēn, *bʰudʰ-mn-és > *bʰudʰmēn, *bʰudʰnés ("bottom") > Ancient Greek πυθμήν [pytʰˈmɛ̌ːn] from the nominative, but Sanskrit budʰná- and Latin fundus from the genitive. This would have allowed assimilation of *n to the now preceding consonant; Kroonen (2011) proposed that this happened in such words, yielding e.g. Proto-Germanic *budmô, *buttiz ("bottom").

=== Directional adverbs ===
In addition to prepositions that indicated relative locations (such as "in" or "over"), Proto-Germanic had a large set of directional adverbs: "locative" ones (with meanings such as "inside" or "on top"), "allative" ones (with meanings such as "into" or "up") and "ablative" ones (with meanings such as "out from the inside" or "down from above"). Many, but not all of these forms had long consonants. Kroonen (2011, 2012) reconstructed examples like this and attributed them to Kluge's law:

	preposition	"locative"	"allative"	"ablative"
PIE	*upó	*up-nói	*up-né or *up-nó	*upó-neh₁
PGmc	*uba	*uppai	*uppe or *uppa	*ubanē
meaning	over	on top	up	down from above

=== néh₂-"present" verbs: iteratives ===
néh₂-presents	PIE	PGmc
3p. singular	C_C-néh₂-ti	C_CC-ōþi
3p. plural	C_C-n̥h₂-énti	C_G-unanþi

== Chronology ==
The law had sparked discussions about its chronology in relation to Grimm's law and Verner's law. The problem is that the traditional ordering (1. Grimm, 2. Verner, 3. Kluge) cannot account for the absence of voice in the Proto-Germanic geminates. Therefore, it has been proposed to rearrange the order of events so that the Proto-Germanic geminates' loss of voice may be equated with that part of Grimm's law that turns mediae into voiceless tenues. This would mean that characteristics noted in Kluge's law happened before (or between different phases of) those of Grimm's law. If accepted, this has further consequences, because those characteristics of Verner's law must in fact, precede those of Kluge's law, or otherwise it can not be explained why both the reflexes of Proto-Indo-European voiced aspirated plosives and Proto-Indo-European voiceless plosives underwent the changes characteristic in Kluge's law. Consequently, this would put Verner's law chronologically in the first position, followed by Kluge's, and finally by Grimm's law.

Under the updated view, the processes may be summarized by the following table:

Pre-Proto-Germanic	-tʰnV́-	-dʱnV́-	-dnV́-	All three sets of stops occur before accented suffixes.
Verner's law	-dʱnV́-	-dʱnV́-	-dnV́-	Voiceless stops occurring after an unaccented syllable are voiced.
Kluge's law	-dːV́-	-dːV́-	-dːV́-	Stop + *n becomes, before an accented vowel, a geminate.
Grimm's law and stress shift	-tːV-	-tːV-	-tːV-	Voiced stops are devoiced, and accent is shifted to the initial syllable.

== Criticism ==
Soon after the initial publications, Kluge's law came to be considered an unnecessary hypothesis by several authors. With rather few exceptions, introductory texts have ignored it, and more detailed works on Proto-Germanic have generally dismissed it rather briefly; according to Guus Kroonen, "it has been seriously challenged throughout the 20th century, and nowadays even borders on the uncanonical in both Indo-European and Germanic linguistics".

=== Lack of evidence ===
Beginning with Reinhold Trautmann, several authors (e.g. Jerzy Kuryłowicz, Sarah Fagan, and Don Ringe) have stated that there are very few or no cases where a Proto-Germanic root with a long plosive corresponds to, or is best explained as corresponding to, a Proto-Indo-European root followed by a suffix that began with n.

Rosemarie Lühr and Kroonen countered by presenting long lists of examples, especially (as they point out) of n-stem nouns.

=== Expressive gemination ===
Onomatopoetic roots often end in a long plosive in Germanic languages. Examples include the Old Norse words klappa "to clap", okka "to sigh", and skvakka "to make a gurgling sound", Old Swedish kratta and modern German kratzen "to scratch", modern Norwegian tikka "to tap", Old Frisian kloppa and modern German klopfen "to knock", and Old English cluccian "to cluck". Long consonants more generally are ubiquitous in Germanic nicknames such as Old English Totta from Torhthelm, Beoffa from Beornfriþ, Blæcca for a black-haired man (note the short /k/ in blæc), Eadda (and German Otto) from all names with Proto-Germanic *Auda-, a long list of Gothic ones whose referents are often difficult or impossible to reconstruct (Ibba, Faffo, Mammo, Oppa, Riggo, Wacca, etc.; possibly also atta, meaning "father"), German ones such as – accounting for the High German consonant shift – Fritz (*Fritta(n)-) from Friedrich, Lutz (*(H)lutta(n)-) from Ludwig, and Sicko (*Sikkan-) from Si(e)gmar, and finally Icelandic Solla from Sólrún, Magga from Margrét, Nonni from Jón, Stebbi from Stefán, Mogga from Morgunblaðið, and lögga "cop" from lögreglan "the police"; Gąsiorowski further proposed to explain the otherwise enigmatic English words dog, pig, frog, stag, (ear)wig, and Old English sucga "dunnock" and *tacga ~ *tecga "young sheep" (not attested in the nominative singular) as nicknames formed to various nouns or adjectives. Some authors, such as Trautmann and Fagan, have tried to ascribe all long plosives of Proto-Germanic to "intensive" or "expressive gemination" on the basis of the idea that the roots that contained them had meanings connected to emotions, including intensity and iteration; this idea, first formulated by Gerland – long before Kluge published), was accepted e.g. in the extremely influential, Indogermanisches etymologisches Wörterbuch as well as the more specialist works of Seebold and Kluge & Seebold, and was considered "still perhaps the most widely accepted explanation" by Ringe.

Lühr and Jens Elmegård Rasmussen, approvingly cited by Kroonen, as well as Kortlandt, countered that most nouns with long plosives or evidence of consonant gradation did not have meanings that would fit this hypothesis. The same works pointed out that "expressive gemination" does not explain why so many of these nouns are n-stems. Moreover, expressive gemination cannot explain the many cases where Proto-Germanic */pː tː kː/ correspond to Proto-Indo-European */bʱ dʱ ɡʲʱ ɡʱ/ (as in Old English liccian "to lick" from Proto-Indo-European *leiǵh-, where **licgian would be expected in Old English), it cannot explain Proto-Germanic */p t k/ corresponding to Proto-Indo-European */bʱ dʱ ɡʲʱ ɡʱ/ (as in Old English dēop from Proto-Indo-European *dʰeubʰ-), and it cannot explain Proto-Germanic */p t k/ corresponding to Proto-Indo-European */p t kʲ k/ (as in Middle Dutch token "to push" from Proto-Indo-European *duk-), while Kluge's law followed by analogy has no problem with such phenomena. Kroonen added: "Moreover, the Expressivity Theory [sic] seems to contain a critical theoretical fallacy. It is a priori implausible that a completely new range of phonemes (i.e. geminates) could be introduced into a linguistic system by extra-linguistic factors such as charged semantics. In this respect, some versions of the Expressivity Theory are truly comparable to what in biology is known as Aristotle's generatio spontanea hypothesis [...], which revolved around the idea that living organisms, such as flies and eels, come about spontaneously in decaying corpses." Finally, the nicknames with long consonants (including Gothic atta) are n-stems; n-stem nicknames occur in other Indo-European branches as well, such as Latin Catō, Varrō, Nerō and Greek Platōn, Strabōn, and "Germanic has many personalizing or individualizing n-stems that are structurally identical with the hypocorisms [nicknames], e.g. OHG chresso 'groundling' to chresan 'to crawl' (Kuryłowicz 1957) [...]".

Most of the Proto-Germanic long plosives are voiceless; but while long voiced plosives were rare, they do have to be reconstructed in a few cases. The hypothesis of expressive gemination has trouble explaining this, as Trautmann admitted while rejecting Kluge's law: "Wie wir uns freilich das Nebeneinander von z. B. kk- gg- k- g- zu erklären haben, weiss ich nicht" – 'I do not know, however, how we ought to explain the coexistence of e.g. kk- gg- k- g-'. Kroonen says: "The only existing theory that is powerful enough to explain such root variations, is the one that acknowledges consonant gradation and the underlying mechanism of the paradigmatic contaminations. The co-occurrence of ON riga 'to lift heavily' : MLG wriggen 'to twist' : ME wricken 'to wiggle', for instance, implies two different expressive formations within the Expressivity Theory, the choice between a voiced and voiceless geminate being arbitrary, erratic, or, in other words, scientifically unfalsifiable. By reconstructing a paradigm *wrikkōþi, *wrigunanþi < *uriḱ-néh₂-ti, *uriḱ-nh₂-énti, on the other hand, the only irregular form is *wrigg-, which may be explained readily by contamination of *wrig- and *wrikk-."

Similarly, Piotr Gąsiorowski felt that it was "methodologically unsound to invoke" "psycholinguistic factors" and other hypotheses of irregular development "until we have tried everything else", in this case, a regular sound law such as Kluge's. Kroonen pointed out that, by virtue of having first been published in 1869, the hypothesis of expressive gemination "basically stems from the time before the rise of the Neogrammarian doctrine of Ausnahmslosigkeit der Lautgesetze" ('exceptionlessness of the sound laws').

=== Substrate influence ===
As pointed out above, long consonants did not exist in Proto-Indo-European, and many Germanic roots are attested with a long consonant in some of the ancient languages, but with a short one in others (often together with a short or a long vowel, respectively). This led the "Leiden School" to postulate that the Germanic roots with long plosives were not inherited from Proto-Indo-European, but borrowed from a substrate language. Kroonen reported that his doctorate at the University of Leiden was originally intended

to investigate the influence of lost non-Indo-European languages on the Proto-Germanic lexicon. [...] During the course of time, however, my dissertation gradually developed into a study of the Proto-Germanic n-stems and their typical morphology. The reason for this change of direction was that the most important formal criterion that had been used in order to isolate non-Indo-European words from the rest of the lexicon – the Proto-Germanic geminates – turned out to be significantly overrepresented in this morphological category.
The advocates of the Leiden Substrate Theory had defined the typical Germanic cross-dialectal interchange of singulate and geminate roots as the prime indicator of prehistoric language contact. For this reason, this substrate language had even been dubbed the "Language of the Geminates". Yet, beside the fact that geminates were not at all distributed randomly across the vocabulary, as would be expected in the case of language contact, the interchanges proved to be far from erratic. In fact, they turned out to be strikingly predictable in nature.

While it is by no means impossible that there was "a substrate language with geminates", or even "that Kluge's law was triggered by the absorption of speakers of this substrate language into the PIE dialect that ultimately became known as Germanic", Kroonen found no evidence for such hypotheses and stressed that a long consonant in a Germanic root may not be taken as evidence that this root was borrowed.

=== Timing ===
Long plosives are very rare in the known Gothic material; other than the abovementioned nicknames (including atta), they are attested only in skatts ("money"), smakka ("fig"; n-stem) and the Latin loanword, sakkus ("sack"). Therefore, Kuryłowicz and Fagan argued that long plosives were absent in Proto-Germanic and only arose in Proto-Northwest Germanic – so that, if Kluge's law exists at all, it must have operated between Proto-Germanic and Proto-Northwest Germanic, not between Proto-Indo-European and Proto-Germanic.

Lühr and Kroonen have pointed out that strong verbs with /p t k/ following a long vowel, diphthong or "resonant" are common in the Gothic Bible, and that many of these are clearly related to iteratives with long consonants that are attested in Northwest Germanic languages. Kroonen further drew attention to the fact that the Old Saxon Heliand, an epic poem about the life of Jesus, contains only three words with long plosives of potentially Proto-Germanic origin (skatt "treasure, money", likkōn "to lick"; upp, uppa, uppan "on top", "up", "down from above"), while such words "are ever-present in Middle Low German", and approvingly cited the hypothesis by Kuryłowicz that words with long plosives were considered stylistically inappropriate for a Christian religious work because long plosives were so common in nicknames – they may have sounded too colloquial and informal.

== See also ==
- Glossary of sound laws in the Indo-European languages
