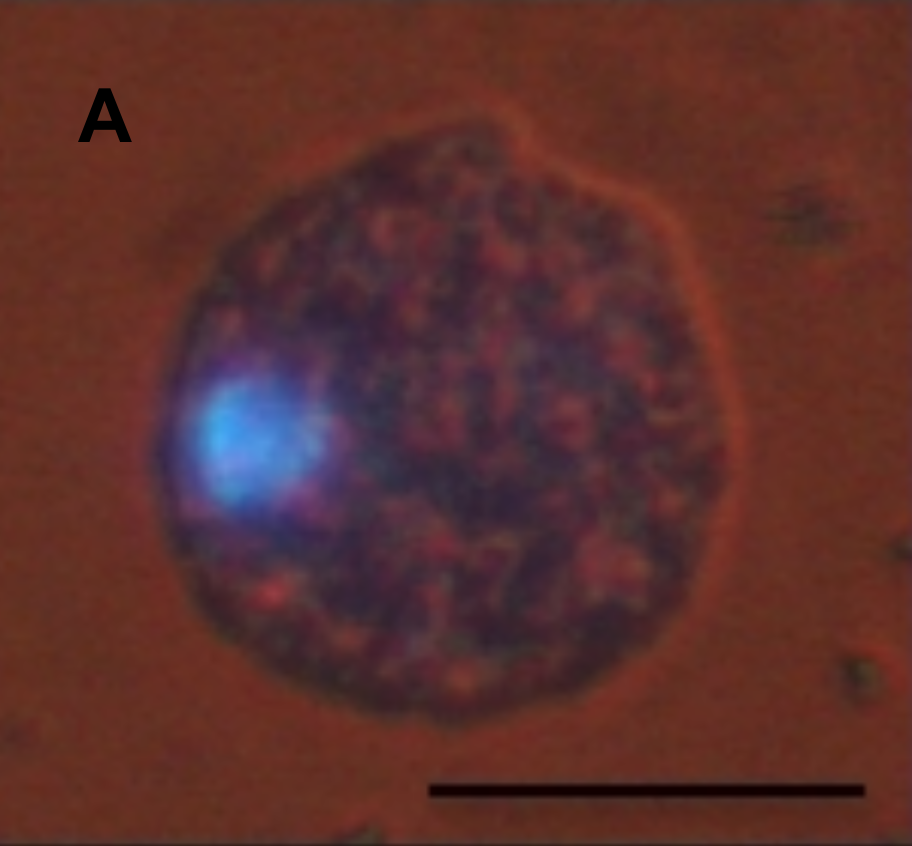
- Allogromia laticollaris

Scientific classification
- Domain: Eukaryota
- Clade: Sar
- Clade: Rhizaria
- Phylum: Retaria
- Subphylum: Foraminifera
- Class: Monothalamea
- Order: Allogromiida
- Family: Allogromiidae
- Subfamily: Allogromiinae
- Genus: Allogromia; Rhumbler, 1904

Synonyms
- Arrogromium Rhumbler, 1913; Craterina Gruber, 1884

= Allogromia =

Genus of single-celled organisms

Allogromia is a genus of Foraminifera.

Species:

- Allogromia fluviatilis (Dujardin, 1841)
- Allogromia lagenoides (Gruber, 1884)
- Allogromia laticollaris Arnold, 1948
- Allogromia ledanteci De Saedeleer, 1934
- Allogromia marina Nyholm & Gertz, 1973
- Allogromia mollis (Gruber, 1884)
- Allogromia ovoidea Rhumbler, 1904
- Allogromia terricola (Leidy, 1874)
- Allogromia verbrugghei De Saedeleer, 1934
