= Karl Weinhold =

German philologist

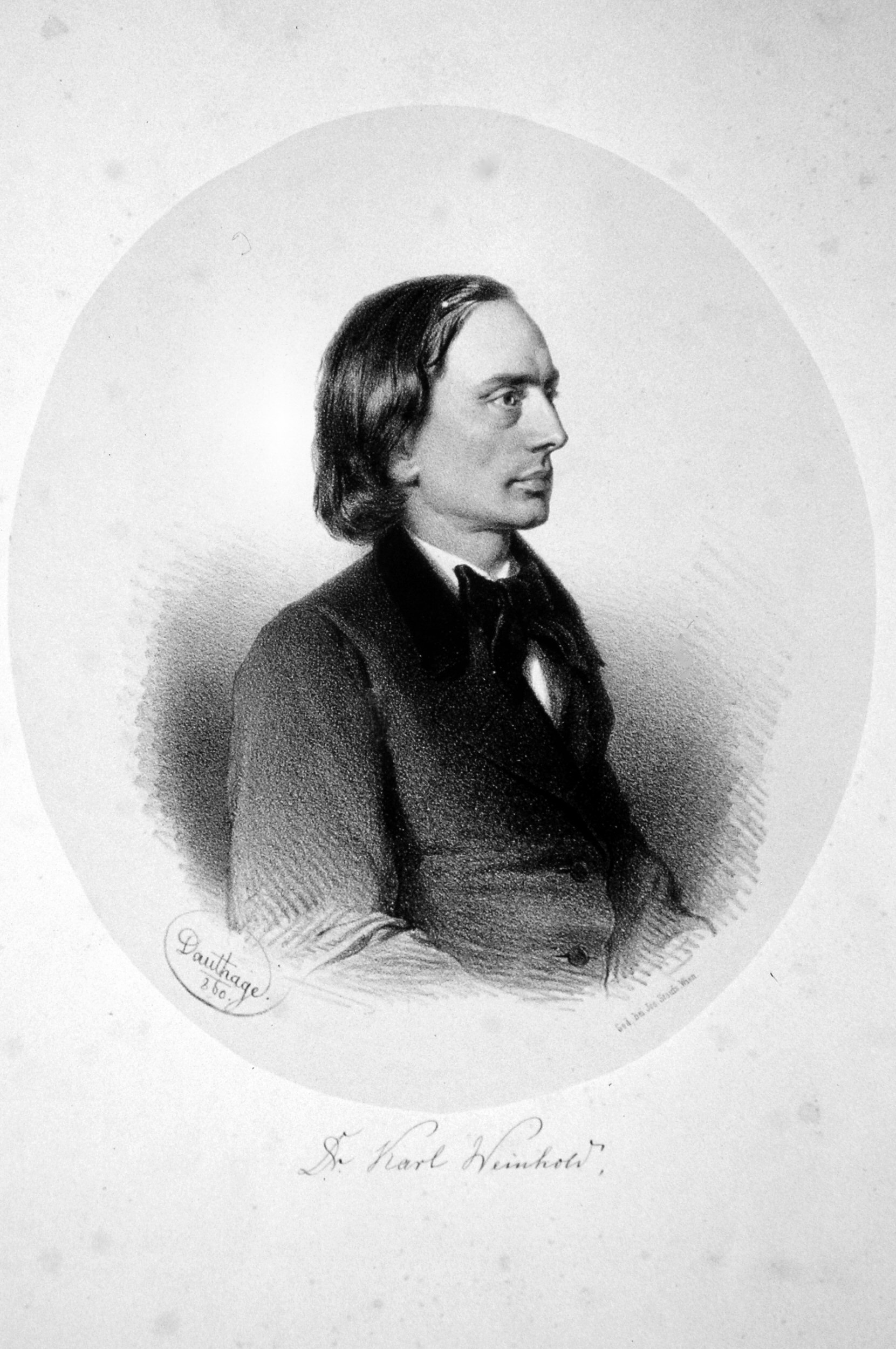
- Born: 26 October 1823; Reichenbach, Prussia
- Died: 15 August 1901 (aged 77); Berlin, Germany

Academic background
- Education: University of Breslau; University of Berlin; University of Halle
- Academic advisor: Theodor Jacobi

Academic work
- Discipline: Germanic studies
- Sub-discipline: German philology; Old Norse studies
- Institutions: University of Breslau; Jagellonian University; University of Graz; University of Kiel; University of Berlin
- Notable students: Friedrich von der Leyen
- Main interests: Early Germanic literature; Germanic Antiquity; Germanic religion

Karl Gotthelf Jakob Weinhold (26 October 1823, in Reichenbach – 15 August 1901, in Bad Nauheim) was a German folklorist and linguist who specialized in German studies.

== Biography ==
Karl Weinhold was born in Reichenbach, Prussia on 26 October 1823. From 1842 he studied at the universities of Breslau and Berlin, obtaining his habilitation at Halle in 1847. In 1850 he became a professor of German language and literature at the University of Krakow. Afterwards, he taught as a professor at the universities of Graz (1851–61), Kiel (1861–75), Breslau (1876–89) and Berlin (from 1889). On three separate occasions he served as university rector; 1870–72 at Kiel, 1879/80 at Breslau and 1893/94 at Berlin.

In 1891 he was a founder of the Zeitschrift des Vereins für Volkskunde ("Journal of the Association of Folklore").

== Selected works ==
- Die deutschen Frauen in dem Mittelalter. Ein Beitrag zu den Hausalterthümern der Germanen, 1850 – German women in the Middle Ages.
- Mittelhochdeutsches Lesebuch, mit einem metrischen Anhang und einem Glossar, 1850 – Middle High German reader, with a metric appendix and a glossary.
- Weihnacht-spiele und lieder aus Süddeutschland und Schlesien, 1853 – Christmas games and songs from southern Germany and Silesia.
- Ueber deutsche Dialectforschung, 1853 – German dialect studies.
- Altnordisches leben, 1856 – Old Norse life.
- Alemannische Grammatik, 1863 – Alemannic German grammar.
- Grammatik der deutschen Mundarten, 1863 – Grammar of German dialects.
- Bairische grammatik, 1867 – Bavarian grammar.
- Heinrich Christian Boie. Beitrag zur Geschichte der deutschen Literatur im achtzehnten Jahrhundert, 1868 – Heinrich Christian Boie. Contribution to the history of German literature in the eighteenth century.
- Mittelhochdeutsche Grammatik, 1877 – Middle High German grammar.
- Dramatischer Nachlass von J.M.R. Lenz (as editor, 1887) – Dramatic nachlass of Jakob Michael Reinhold Lenz.
- Die Verbreitung und die Herkunft der Deutschen in Schlesien, 1887 – The distribution and origin of Germans in Silesia.

== See also ==
- Karl Müllenhoff
- Richard Heinzel
- Hugo Gering
