= Allogromia terricola =

Scientific classification
- Domain: Eukaryota
- Clade: Sar
- Clade: Rhizaria
- Phylum: Retaria
- Subphylum: Foraminifera
- Class: Monothalamea
- Order: Allogromiida
- Family: Allogromiidae
- Genus: Allogromia
- Species: A. terricola

Binomial name
- Allogromia terricola (Leidy, 1874)

Synonyms
- Gromia terricola Leidy, 1874

Single-celled organism

Allogromia terricola is a species of unicellular foraminiferan in the genus Allogromia.
