= Ludwig Rhumbler =

German author and zoologist (1864–1939)

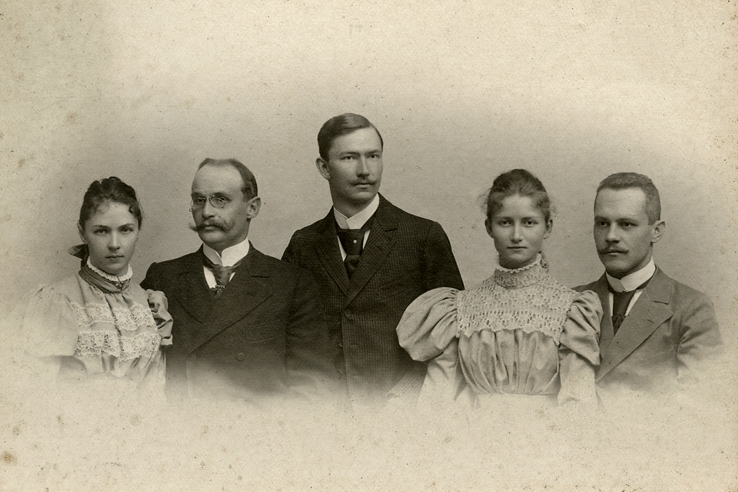
After the double wedding. Left to right: Helene Höpfner, Ludwig Rhumbler, Willy son of Ernst Höpfner, Johanna Höpfner and Arnold Sommerfeld, Göttingen, 1897

Johann Ludwig Rhumbler (3 June 1864 – 6 June 1939) was a German zoologist who pioneered the application of ideas from physics and engineering in biology. He was involved in the systematics of the foraminifera but he was also interested in the physics and mechanics involved in embryonic development. He worked as a professor of forest zoology at the forestry school in Hannoversch-Münden from 1906 to 1929.

== Life and work ==
Rhumbler was born in Frankfurt-am-Main and went to study at the Universities of Marburg, Berlin, and Strassburg. Initially intending to study Germanistics, he was inspired by the work of Otto Bütschli to study the protozoa. His doctoral dissertation under Alexander W. von Götte at Strassburg was Über die Enzystierung bei Colpoda cucullus. In 1890 he went to Oldenburg as an assistant in the Coastal and Deep-Sea Fisheries Section. He joined the University of Göttingen in 1892 and worked for his habilitation under Ernst Ehlers on a classification of Foraminifera. He was interested in the physical forces involved in morphological development. In 1897 he married Helene, daughter of Ernst Höpfner, in a double wedding with her sister Johanna marrying the physicist Arnold Sommerfeld. In 1902 he wrote a thesis on the mechanics of gastrulation in Zur Mechanik des Gastrulationsvorganges insbesondere der Invagination. He considered cell movements as being controlled by physical factors. Rhumbler coined the term "double assurance" which was developed by Hans Spemann. Rhumbler's idea was that more than two processes were involved in achieving a particular phenomenon that one saw in cells. Bütschli was interested in the process of mitosis and how material moves within the protoplasm of the cell and Rhumbler supported the alveolar theory. In 1906 he moved to the Forest Academy in Hannoversch Münden where he began to look at applied zoology. He studied forest insects and the mechanics of deer antlers. He suggested that the shape of deer antlers was decided by the branching of blood vessels and showed that abnormal shapes could be traced to abnormalities in the developmental mechanics. In 1914 he served in World War I and was wounded. His doctoral students included the entomologist Fritz Schwerdtfeger. In 1923, the forest academy was made into a university and he became the first rector and retired in 1929.

Rhumbler designed a field microscope for studying insects in the field, developed techniques for detecting increase or decrease in populations and suggested modifications to the Linnean naming system. Rhumbler contributed to Kükenthal's Handbuch der Zoologie volume with an introduction to rhizopods, ciliates and acinetans. In 1922 he produced a new edition of Nüßlin's textbook on forest entomology "Lehrbuch der Forstentomologie".
