= Ernst Alfred Philippson =

American philologist (1900–1993)

- Born: 6 April 1900; Mönchengladbach, Germany
- Died: 9 August 1993 (aged 93); Urbana, Illinois

Academic background
- Education: University of Cologne
- Doctoral advisor: Friedrich von der Leyen

Academic work
- Discipline: Germanic philology
- Institutions: University of Michigan; University of Cologne; University of Illinois Urbana-Champaign
- Notable students: Elmer H. Antonsen
- Main interests: Germanic religion

Ernst Alfred Philippson (6 April 1900 – 9 August 1993) was an American philologist who specialized in Germanic studies.

== Biography ==
Ernst Alfred Philippson was born in Mönchengladbach, Germany on 6 April 1900 to a prominent Jewish family. He was the son of the dentist Ernst Moritz Philippson (1871-1924) and Johanna Mühlinghaus (1878-1945). He was first cousin to a distinguished geographer Alfred Philippson, and the husband of Margarete Josephine Hecker (1903-1989).

Since 1918, Philippson studied German, English and history at the University of Bonn, the Ludwig-Maximilians-Universität München, and the University of Cologne. He received his Ph.D. in German philology at Cologne in 1924 under the supervision of Friedrich von der Leyen with a thesis on fairy tales: Der Märchentypus von König Drosselbart. He completed his habilitation in 1928 under the supervision of Herbert Schöffler with a thesis on Anglo-Saxon paganism: Germanisches Heidentum bei den Angelsachsen.

Starting in 1928, Philippson became a lecturer in English philology at the University of Cologne. He immigrated to the United States in September 1933, because of anti-Jewish policies being implemented at universities in Germany. His Ph.D. from the University of Cologne was rescinded on the orders of Joseph Goebbels. Philippson subsequently served as assistant professor of German at the University of Michigan (1935-1947). During World War II he taught German in the United States Army.

Philippson transferred to the University of Illinois Urbana-Champaign in 1947, where he served as Associate Professor (1947-1951) and Professor (1951-1968) of Germanic Philology. Philippson specialized in the study of German and English literature, and Germanic religion, and taught Old High German literature through to the period of 17th century literature. Elmer H. Antonsen, one of his students, replaced him upon his retirement at the University of Illinois. Philippson was deeply involved with the Journal of English and Germanic Philology, where he served as Editor (1953-1957) and Co-editor (1957-1971). He was a member of several learned societies, including American Association of Teachers of German, the Modern Language Association and the Linguistic Society of America.

Philippson retired in 1968, but continued to lecture at Columbia University after his retirement. In 1972 the University of Cologne honored Philippson with another doctorate upon the 50th anniversary of obtaining that degree which the Nazi regime had taken away from him. This was the first time in history that a doctorate was re-awarded among any of the German universities. He died in Urbana, Illinois on 9 August 1993.

== Selected works ==
- Der Märchentypus von König Drosselbart (Greifswald 1923)
- "Der Germanische Mütter- und Matronenkult am Niederrhein". In: The Germanic Review vol. 19, 1944, pp. 81–142. doi:10.1080/19306962.1944.11786183
- "Neuere Forschungen Zum Westgermanenproblem und Zur Ausgliederung der Germanischen Stämme." In: Symposium: A Quarterly Journal in Modern Literatures. 8:1 (1954), pp. 18–32. doi:10.1080/00397709.1954.10733807
- Germanisches Heidentum bei den Angelsachsen (Leipzig, B. Tauchnitz, 1929. Reprinted: New York, Johnson Corp., 1966)
- Die Genealogie der Götter in germanischer Religion, Mythologie und Theologie. Illinois Studies in Language and Literature, Vol. 37, No. 3. Urbana: University of Illinois Press, 1953. Pp. 94.
- "Phänomenologie, vergleichende Mythologie und germanische Religionsgeschichte". PMLA, vol. 77, no. 3 (June 1962), pp. 187–193. doi:10.2307/460477
