= Gustav Neckel =

German philologist (1878–1940)

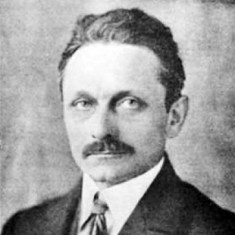
- Born: 17 January 1878; Wismar, Germany
- Died: 28 November 1940 (aged 62); Dresden, Germany

Academic background
- Education: Ludwig-Maximilians-Universität München; Friedrich Wilhelm University of Berlin
- Doctoral advisor: Andreas Heusler
- Other advisor: Hermann Paul

Academic work
- Discipline: Germanic studies
- Sub-discipline: Old Norse studies
- Institutions: Heidelberg University; Friedrich Wilhelm University of Berlin; University of Göttingen
- Notable students: Wolfgang Krause; Konstantin Reichardt; Wilhelm Wissmann
- Main interests: Germanic religion; Old Norse literature

Gustav Neckel (born 17 January 1878 in Wismar, died 24 November 1940 in Dresden) was a German philologist who specialized in Germanic studies.

== Life and career ==
His parents were Gustav Neckel (1844–1923), an industrialist and businessman, and Amanda, née Paetow (1854–1914).

After completing his Abitur in Wismar in 1896, Neckel studied German philology at the Ludwig-Maximilians-Universität München (1896–1897), Leipzig University (1897–1898) and Friedrich Wilhelm University of Berlin (1898–1902), where he obtained his doctorate in 1900 under Andreas Heusler. He then worked as a teacher until completing his Habilitation and becoming a lecturer at the University of Breslau in 1909.

Beginning in 1911, he was Professor of Old Norse at Heidelberg University, then in 1919–1920 at Berlin. From summer semester 1920 until 1935 he succeeded Heusler as Professor of Germanic Studies, with emphasis on the Scandinavian languages. From 1935 to 1937 he was founding Head of the Old Norse Division of the Department of Germanic Studies at the University of Göttingen, then from 1937 to 1940 Professor of Germanic Philology at Berlin, where he was, however, unable to work due to illness; he had a "nervous condition" from which he had barely recovered when he died suddenly of a pulmonary infection.

Neckel's career was disturbed by conflict with Bernhard Kummer and an accusation that he had seduced a student, which led to his being forced to leave Berlin and move to Göttingen; the chair, the most prominent in the field, came with him and a new division was created for him within the Göttingen Department of Germanic Studies.

Neckel resisted the politicisation of his department at Berlin and was open-minded on race and its relevance to his discipline; nevertheless, the increasingly völkisch point of view in his writings, his initial support for Kummer and Herman Wirth, and his advocacy of the autochthonous theory of the origin of the runes have led some to see a marked decline in the calibre of his scholarly work beginning in the mid-1920s. His former teacher Heusler wrote repeatedly to his friend Wilhelm Ranisch that he seemed "no longer entirely sane" and that he seemed to have developed "an unhealthy ambition, not to say megalomania".

Neckel's research focused on early Germanic studies and Old Norse. He published the standard German edition of the Elder Edda. Continuing the approach of Jacob Grimm and of Heusler, he saw all Germanic sources, regardless of period or geographic location, as contributing to the picture of a unified Germanic culture. This culture he believed ethically superior to the medieval Christianity which overtook it, particularly in its respect for women. Heusler and others have considered conflict between ideologues within the Nazi regime, specifically between the Amt Rosenberg, the Ministry and the Ahnenerbe, at least partly to blame for his banishment to Göttingen.

== See also ==
- Otto Höfler
- Friedrich Ranke
- Eugen Mogk
- Jan de Vries (philologist)

== Selected publications ==
- Über die altgermanischen Relativsätze, 1900
- (Editor) Sieben Geschichten von den Ostland-Familien, 1913
- Walhall. Studien über germanischen Jenseitsglauben. Dortmund: Ruhfus, 1913.
- Die Überlieferungen vom Gotte Balder. Dortmund: Ruhfus, 1920.
- (Editor) Die jüngere Edda: mit dem sogenannten ersten grammatischen Traktat, 1925
- Altgermanische Kultur, 1925
- (Editor) Edda. Die Lieder des Codex Regius nebst verwandten Denkmälern. Volume 1: Text. Heidelberg: Winter, 1914. Volume 2: Kommentierendes Glossar. 1927. (Revised editions ed. Hans Kuhn)
- Liebe und Ehe bei den vorchristlichen Germanen. Leipzig: Teubner, 1932.
- Vom Altertum zum Mittelalter, 1935

== Sources ==
- Julia Zernack, "Gustav Karl Paul Christoph Neckel". In Internationales Germanistenlexikon 1800–1950, ed. Christoph König. 3 vols. Berlin: de Gruyter, 2003. ISBN 3-11-015485-4. Volume 2, pp. 1311–12.
- Germanistik und Politik in der Zeit des Nationalsozialismus. Zwei Fallstudien: Hermann Schneider und Gustav Neckel. Ed. Klaus von See and Julia Zernack. Frankfurter Beiträge zur Germanistik 42. Heidelberg: Winter, 2004. ISBN 3-8253-5022-3.
