= Etymological Dictionary of the German Language =

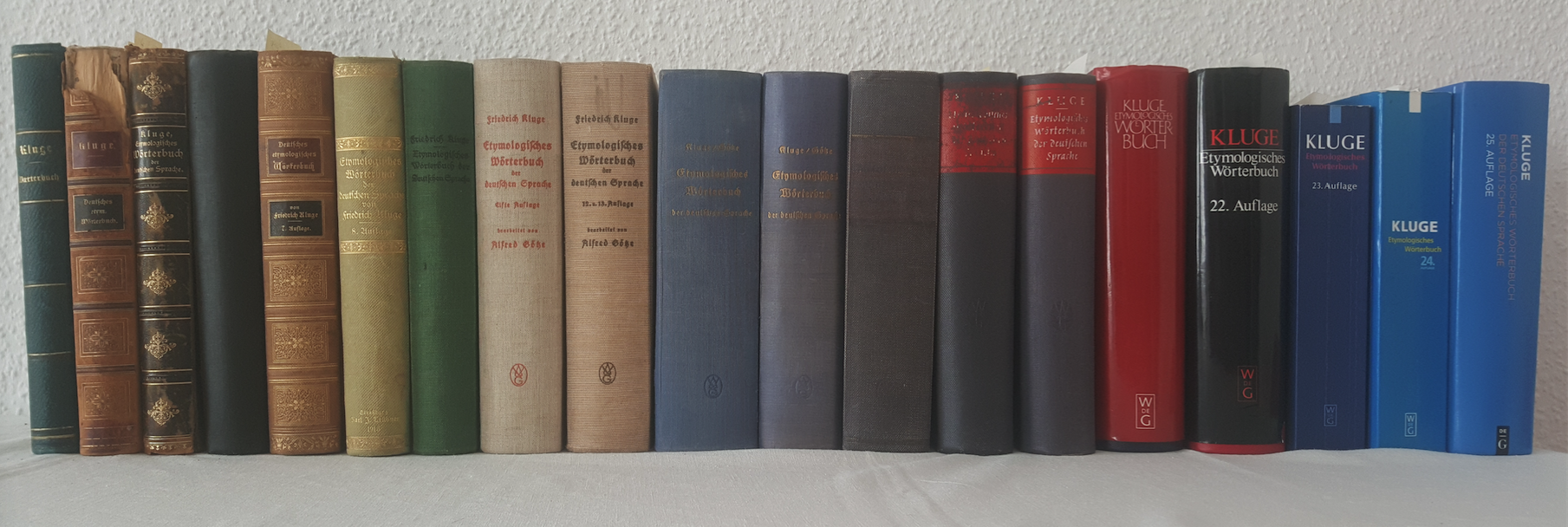
Editions of Kluge's dictionary from 1883 to 2011

The Etymological Dictionary of the German Language (German: Etymologisches Wörterbuch der deutschen Sprache), sometimes referred to simply as Kluge, was published by Friedrich Kluge in 1883. It was the first German etymological dictionary based on Neogrammarian principles. Over the following decades it was republished and revised many times, with Kluge as the editor being succeeded by Alfred Götze, Alfred Schirmer, Walther Mitzka, and Elmar Seebold. It is considered a standard work among the German etymological dictionaries. The most recent edition, 25th, was released in 2011 in print, eBook and as an Android app.

== Editions and editors ==
| Edition | Year | Editor | Pages | Word Count | Remarks |
|---|---|---|---|---|---|
| 1st | 1883 | Friedrich Kluge | 392 | 3900 | published in fascicles since 1881 with vocabulary pp. 395–428; Etymological Dictionary of the German Language at the Internet Archive |
| 2nd, unchanged reprint | 1883 | Friedrich Kluge | 392 | 3900 | with vocabulary pp. 395–428; Digitalisat UB Regensburg, Etymological Dictionary of the German Language at the Internet Archive |
| 3rd, unchanged reprint | 1884 | Friedrich Kluge | 392 | 3900 | with vocabulary pp. 395–428 |
| 4th, revised edition | 1889 | Friedrich Kluge | 405 | 3600 | with vocabulary pp. 409–453; Etymological Dictionary of the German Language at the Internet Archive, Etymological Dictionary of the German Language at the Internet Archive, Etymological Dictionary of the German Language at the Internet Archive, Etymological Dictionary of the German Language at the Internet Archive |
| English translation of 4th ed. | 1891 | Friedrich Kluge | 446 | 3600 | translated by John Francis Davis; Etymological Dictionary of the German Language at the Internet Archive, Etymological Dictionary of the German Language at the Internet Archive |
| 5th, revised edition | 1894 | Friedrich Kluge | 425 | 3600 | with vocabulary pp. 428–491; Etymological Dictionary of the German Language at the Internet Archive, Etymological Dictionary of the German Language at the Internet Archive |
| 6th, improved and enlarged edition | 1899 | Friedrich Kluge | 443 | 4700 | with vocabulary pp. 428–491; Etymological Dictionary of the German Language at the Internet Archive, Etymological Dictionary of the German Language at the Internet Archive, 2. Abdruck 1905: Etymological Dictionary of the German Language at the Internet Archive |
| 7th, improved and enlarged edition | 1910 | Friedrich Kluge | 514 | 5200 | Digitalisat MDZ München, Repozytorium Cyfrowe Instytutów Naukowych |
| 8th, improved and enlarged edition | 1915 | Friedrich Kluge | 510 | 5300 | |
| 9th, revised edition | 1921 | Friedrich Kluge | 510 | 5300 | Digitized Taylor Institution Library |
| 10th, improved and enlarged edition | 1924 | Friedrich Kluge | 552 | 6200 | |
| 11th, revised edition | 1934 | Alfred Götze | 740 | 8300 | |
| 12th and 13th, unchanged reprint | 1943 | Alfred Götze | 740 | 8300 | |
| 14th, unchanged reprint | 1948 | Alfred Götze | 740 | 8300 | |
| 15th, completely revised edition | 1951 | Alfred Schirmer | 933 | 9500 | |
| 16th, corrected edition | 1953 | Alfred Schirmer | 933 | 9500 | last edition to use the Fraktur font |
| 17th, revised edition | 1957 | Walther Mitzka | 900 | 8500 | |
| 18th, revised edition | 1960 | Walther Mitzka | 917 | 8700 | |
| 19th, revised edition | 1963 | Walther Mitzka | 917 | 8700 | |
| 20th, revised edition | 1967 | Walther Mitzka | 915 | 8600 | |
| 21st, unchanged reprint | 1975 | Walther Mitzka | 915 | 8600 | |
| 22nd, revised edition | 1989 | Elmar Seebold | 822 | 12,200 | |
| 23rd, revised and expanded edition | 1995 | Elmar Seebold | 921 | 11,500 | a paperback version also became available in 1999 |
| 24th, revised and expanded edition | 2002 | Elmar Seebold | 1023 | 11,900 | also available in CD-ROM |
| 25th, revised and expanded edition | 2011 | Elmar Seebold | 1021 | 11,900 | ISBN 978-3-11-022364-4; also as an E-Book (ISBN 978-3-11-022365-1) and an Android-App |

== History ==
The 4th edition was translated and published in English by John Francis Davis in 1891.

From the 10th to the 13 editions, between 1924 and 1943, there was a dedication on the flyleaf that read: "To the German people its German dictionary."

In the 1980s, criticism grew about the state of the dictionary. It was argued that it had not been maintained with sufficient rigor and was partially outdated. One of the supporting arguments was that the 21st edition (1975) when compared to the previous edition had remained unchanged. As a result of this criticism a new editor for the dictionary was selected, Elmar Seebold.

== Influence ==
After the publication and success of the 1st edition in 1883, Etymological Dictionary of the German Language became a major source, reference and format guide for etymological dictionaries of other languages. Examples:

- Dutch – Etymologisch Woordenboek der Nederlandsche Taal (1892) by Johannes Franck
- Old Norse – Etymologisk Ordbog over det norske og det danske sprog (1885) by Hjalmar Falk and Alf Torp
- Swedish – Svensk etymologisk ordbok (1922) by Elof Hellquist
- English – An etymological dictionary of the English language (1893) by Walter William Skeat
- Danish – Dansk etymologisk ordbog by Niels Åge Nielsen
