= Hermann Paul =

German philologist (1846–1921)

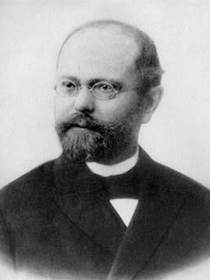
- Born: 7 August 1846; Magdeburg, Kingdom of Prussia
- Died: 29 December 1921 (aged 75); Munich, Germany

Academic background
- Education: Leipzig University
- Doctoral advisor: Friedrich Karl Theodor Zarncke

Academic work
- Discipline: Germanic studies
- Institutions: University of Freiburg
- Notable students: Gustav Neckel; Rudolf Pfeiffer; Karl Helm; Friedrich Kauffmann; Friedrich Kluge; Hermann Schneider
- Main interests: Early Germanic literature; Germanic linguistics

Hermann Otto Theodor Paul (August 7, 1846, Salbke – December 29, 1921, Munich) was a German philologist, linguist and lexicographer.

== Biography ==
He studied at the Friedrich Wilhelm University of Berlin and Leipzig University, and in 1874 became professor of German language and literature in the University of Freiburg. In 1893, he was appointed professor of German philology at the Ludwig-Maximilians-Universität München. He was a prominent Neogrammarian.

== Works ==
His main work, Prinzipien der Sprachgeschichte (Halle: Max Niemeyer, 1st ed. 1880; 3d ed. 1898), has been translated into English: Paul, Hermann 1970. Principles of the History of Language, translated from 2nd edition by H. A. Strong (1888; retranslated with changes by Strong, Logeman, and Wheeler in 1891). College Park: McGroth Publishing Company, ISBN 0-8434-0114-1.

According to Paul, sentences are the sum of their parts. They arise sequentially from individual associations, linked together in a linear form (1886. See also, Blumenthal, 1970). Wilhelm Wundt opposed this theory of sentences, arguing that they begin as a simultaneous thought that is converted into linear, sequential parts (1900).

Other works:

- Gab es eine mittelhochdeutsche Schriftsprache? (“Was there a middle high German written language?,” 1873)
- Zur Lautverschiebung (“Vowel shifting,” 1874)
- Kritische Beiträge zu den Minnesingern (“Critical contributions on the Minnesingers,” 1876)
- Zur Nibelungenfrage (“On the Nibelungen question,” 1877)
- Mittelhochdeutsche Grammatik (“Middle high German grammar,” 1881; 25th edition, 2007)
- Grundriss der germanischen Philologie, editor (“Outline of German philology,” 1891-93)
- Aufgabe und Methode der Geschichtswissenschaften (“Function and method of sciences of history,” 1920, E-Book: Berlin 2014, ISBN 978-3-944253-03-9

After 1874 Paul and Wilhelm Braune edited the Beiträge zur Geschichte der deutschen Sprache und Literatur (“Contributions to the history of the German language and its literature”).

== See also ==
- Rudolf Much
