= Elmar Seebold =

German philologist

- Born: 28 September 1934 (age 92); Stuttgart, Germany

Academic work
- Discipline: Germanic philology
- Institutions: University of Fribourg; LMU Munich

Elmar Seebold (born 28 September 1934) is a German philologist who specializes in Germanic philology. From 1971 to 1983, Seebold was Professor of Germanic philology at the University of Fribourg. He then transferred to LMU Munich, from which he then retired in 1999. He is the editor of the Etymological Dictionary of the German Language.

== Selected works ==
- Vergleichendes und etymologisches Wörterbuch der germanischen starken Verben, 1970
- Das System der indogermanischen Halbvokale, 1972
- Etymologie. Eine Einführung am Beispiel der deutschen Sprache, 1981
- Das System der Personalpronomina in den frühgermanischen Sprachen. Sein Aufbau und seine Herkunft, 1984
- Chronologisches Wörterbuch des deutschen Wortschatzes. Der Wortschatz des 8. Jahrhunderts (und früherer Quellen), 2001
- Kluge. Etymologisches Wörterbuch der deutschen Sprache, 2011
