= Eugen Mogk =

German philologist

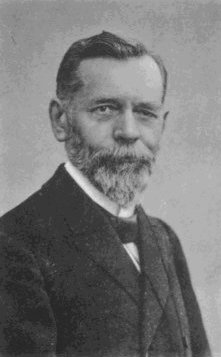
- Born: 19 July 1854; Döbeln, Kingdom of Saxony
- Died: 4 May 1939 (aged 84); Leipzig, Germany

Academic background
- Education: University of Leipzig

Academic work
- Discipline: Germanic studies
- Sub-discipline: Old Norse studies
- Institutions: University of Leipzig
- Notable students: Bernhard Kummer
- Main interests: Early Germanic literature; Germanic religion

Eugen Mogk (19 July 1854 – 4 May 1939) was a German academic specialising in Old Norse literature and Germanic mythology. He held a professorship at the University of Leipzig.

== Life and career ==
Mogk was born in Döbeln. He studied Germanic studies and history at the University of Leipzig from 1875 to 1883, earning his doctorate in 1878 with a dissertation on the Gylfaginning section of the Prose Edda. In 1889 he earned his habilitation in Scandinavian philology with an edition and translation of "The So-Called Second Grammatical Tractate of the Snorra Edda". He taught Scandinavian philology at the university from 1888 until his retirement in 1925: until 1893 as a privatdozent, from 1893 to 1901 as professor (nichtplanmäßiger außerordentlicher Professor), from 1901 to 1923 as full professor (planmäßiger außerordentlicher Professor) and from 1923 to 1925 as chair (ordentlicher Professor). Among his students were Bernhard Kummer and Konstantin Reichardt. In November 1933 he was a signatory to the statement of college and university faculty in support of Hitler and the Nazi regime. He died in Leipzig.

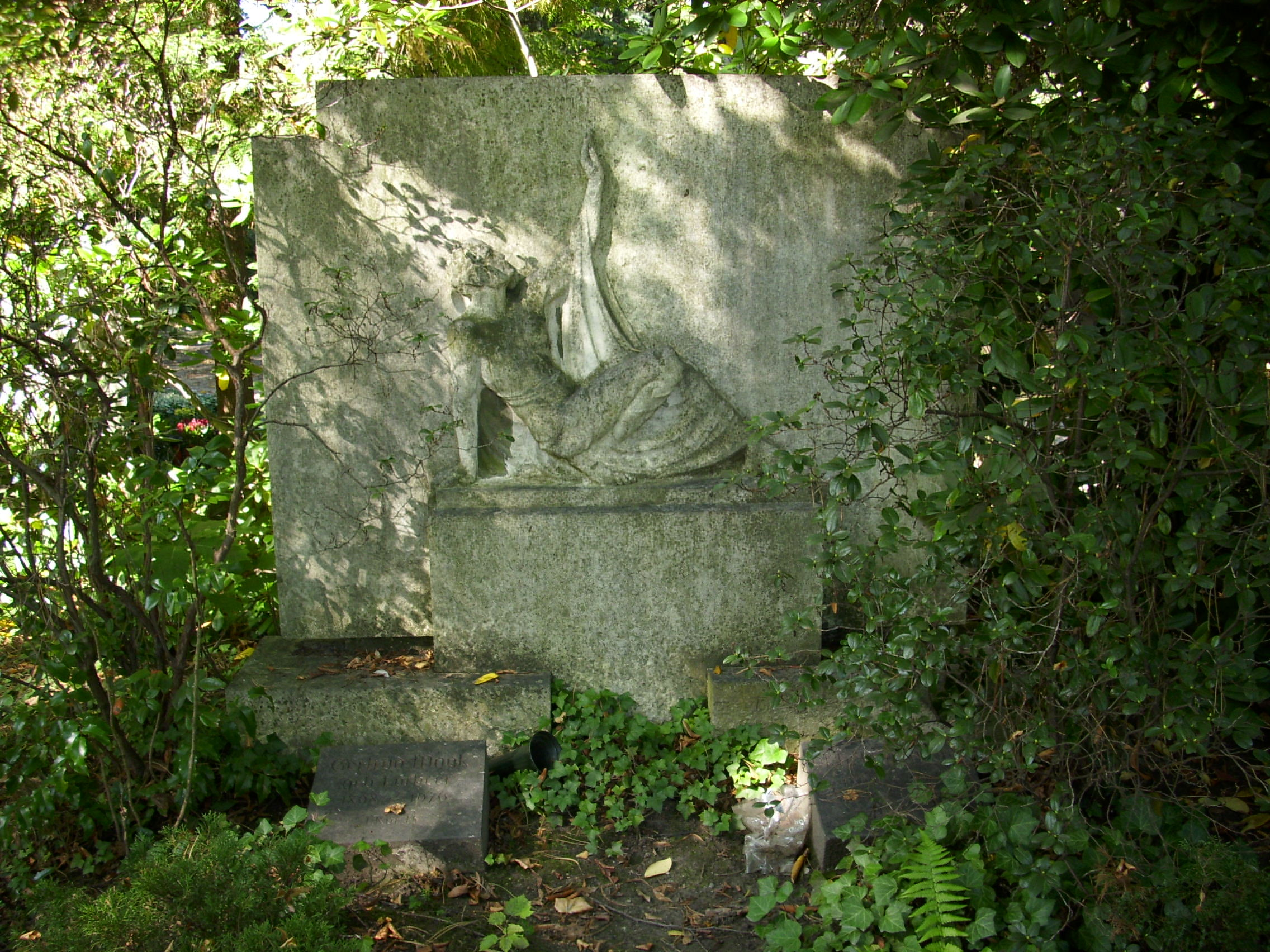
Gravesite of Mogk at Südfriedhof (Leipzig).

Mogk married Margarete Scheer; they had three sons. His son Helmut Mogk became head of the University of Leipzig library.

== Memberships and honours ==
Mogk was a member of the Royal Danish Society of Antiquaries, the Finno-Ugrian Society, the Saxonian Academy of Sciences and the Association for Saxon Folklore, whose Publications he edited from 1897 on. He also belonged to the Leoniden, an association of artists and intellectuals in Leipzig founded in 1909.

In 1924 he was honoured with a festschrift.

== Publications and views ==
For the reference series Pauls Grundriß der germanischen Philologie, Mogk wrote both the survey of Old Norse literature (Norwegisch-isländische Literatur, 1889) and that of Norse mythology (Mythologie, 1891). The latter was replaced in 1935–37 by Jan de Vries' Altgermanische Religionsgeschichte. He also edited a three-volume collection called Altnordische Textbibliothek and was one of the editors of the Altnordische Sagabibliothek collection of the Icelandic sagas that began publication in 1891.

Mogk focussed on the Old Norse texts as literature, and in a number of publications argued that Snorri Sturluson was a mythographer, who composed stories of the Germanic gods to explain poetic allusions rather than reporting pre-existing myths. For example, he argued that in the passage in the Eddic poem "Völuspá" usually taken as referring to the Æsir–Vanir War, the Vanir were initially within the stronghold with the Æsir and that after the wall was breached, they fought against not the Æsir but the gods' common enemy, the giants; he interpreted Gullveig as a giantess, not one of the Vanir. Georges Dumézil argued forcefully against Mogk's viewpoint, accusing him of character assassination and a "war" and "sterilisation" of the traditional sources in the field. Mogk's view on Snorri can be seen as the culmination of the evolutionary view that stages of development can be discerned in Old Norse religion, and that some of the gods, such as Thor and Odin, were later developments than agricultural deities such as Freyr.

Mogk also wrote about folklore, for example a 1929 study of the medieval conciliation crosses, and exerted influence on the development of the field of folklore studies in Germany; he argued for an emphasis on authenticity in studying folklore and that folk materials were characterised by unthinking reflex, rather than conscious invention.

== Selected works ==
- Untersuchungen über die Gylfaginning: 1. Teil. Das Handschriftenverhältnis der Gylfaginning, 1879
- (Publisher) Altnordische Texte. 1: Gunnlaugssaga Ormstungn, 1886
- (Publisher) Gunlaugssaga ormstungu, 1886
- Kelten und Nordgermanen im 9. und 10. Jahrhundert, 1896
- Die Menschenopfer bei den Germanen, 1909
- Der Ursprung der mittelalterlichen Sühnekreuze, 1929
- Zur Bewertung der Snorra-Edda als religionsgeschichtliche und mythologische Quelle des nordgermanischen Heidentums, 1932

== See also ==
- Hugo Gering
- Rudolf Much
- Andreas Heusler
- Gustav Neckel
- Jan de Vries (philologist)
