= Friedrich von der Leyen =

German philologist

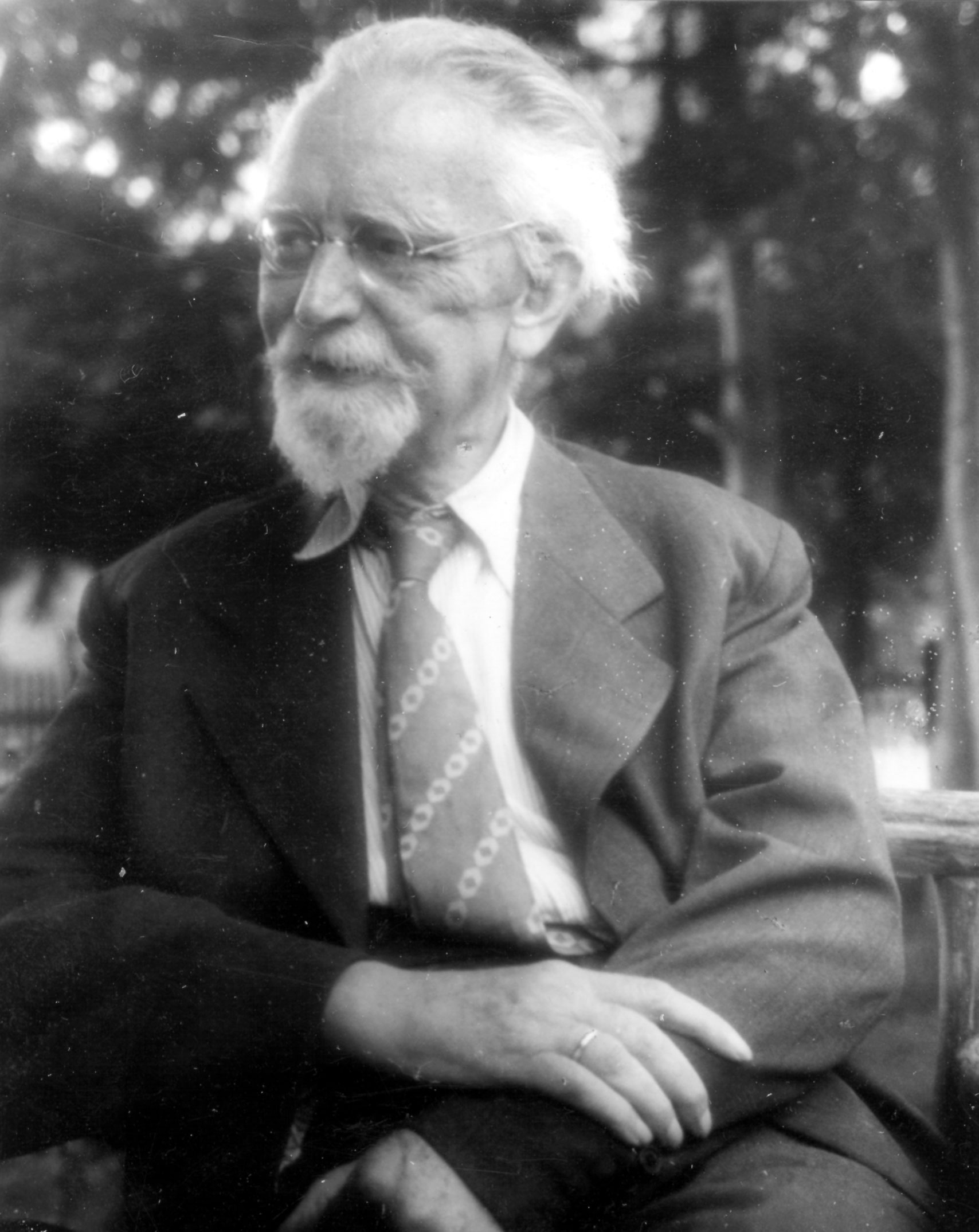
- Prof. Dr. phil. von der Leyen
- Born: 19 August 1873; Bremen, Germany
- Died: 6 June 1966 (aged 92); Kirchseeon, Germany
- Spouse: Helene von der Leyen

Academic background
- Education: Friedrich Wilhelm University of Berlin
- Doctoral advisor: Karl Weinhold

Academic work
- Discipline: Germanic philology
- Institutions: University of Cologne
- Notable students: Kurt Schier; Konstantin Reichardt; Ernst Alfred Philippson; Hermann Schneider
- Main interests: German folklore; Germanic mythology; Medieval German literature; Old Norse literature
- Notable works: Die Götter der Germanen (1938)

Friedrich Gustav von der Leyen (19 August 1873 – 6 June 1966) was a German philologist who specialized in Germanic studies.

== Biography ==
Friedrich Gustav von der Leyen was born in Bremen, Germany on 19 August 1873, and belonged to the House of Leyen. He was the son of the railroad lawyer and honorary professor Dr. jur. Alfred Friedrich von der Leyen (1844–1934) and his wife Luise Isabella Kapp (1852–1908). Luise was the daughter of Friedrich Kapp and sister of Wolfgang Kapp. Friedrich had four siblings, among them Generalleutnant of the Wehrmacht Ludwig Friedrich von der Leyen (1885–1967).

Von der Leyen studied at Marburg University, Leipzig University, and the Friedrich Wilhelm University of Berlin, receiving his Ph.D. at Berlin in 1894 under the supervision of Karl Weinhold with a thesis on Medieval German literature. He habilitated at the Ludwig-Maximilians-Universität München in 1899 with a thesis on Norse mythology. From 1920 to his retirement in 1937, von der Leyen was Chair of German Philology at the University of Cologne. Upon his retirement, von der Leyen published his Die Götter der Germanen (1938), which examined gods in Germanic mythology. Von der Leyen was a known specialist on German folklore. Together with Eugen Diederichs and Paul Zaunert, he founded and edited the Die Märchen der Weltliteratur.

Following World War II, von der Leyen returned to the University of Cologne, where he served as an honorary professor from 1947 to 1953. He died in Kirchseeon, Germany on 6 June 1966.

== Selected works ==
- Des armen Hartmann Rede vom Glouven. Eine deutsche Reimpredigt des 12. Jahrhunderts. Marcus: Breslau 1897 (= Dissertation Berlin).
- Kleine Beiträge zur deutschen Litteraturgeschichte im 11. und 12. Jahrhundert. Niemeyer: Halle/S. 1897.
- Das Märchen in den Göttersagen der Edda. Reimer: Berlin 1899.
- Deutsche Universität und deutsche Zukunft. Betrachtungen. Diederichs: Jena 1906.
- Einführung in das Gotische. Beck: Munich 1908.
- Das Märchen. Ein Versuch. Quelle & Meyer: Leipzig 1911 (4. Auflage 1958).
- Das Studium der deutschen Philologie. Reinhardt: Munich 1913.
- Deutsche Dichtung in neuerer Zeit. Diederichs: Jena 1922.
- Geschichte der deutschen Dichtung. Ein Überblick. Bruckmann: Munich 1926.
- Volkstum und Dichtung. Studien zum Ursprung und zum Leben der Dichtung. Diederichs: Jena 1933.
- Deutsche Dichtung und deutsches Wesen. Schaffstein: Cologne 1934.
- Die Götter der Germanen. Beck: Munich 1938.
- Die deutsche Dichtung und die Weltliteratur. Verlag der Löwe: Cologne 1950.
- Deutsche Philologie. Eine Einführung in ihr Studium. Klett: Stuttgart 1952.
- Das Heldenliederbuch Karls des Grossen. Bestand, Gehalt, Wirkung. Beck: Munich 1954.
- Leben und Freiheit der Hochschule. Erinnerungen. Reykers: Cologne 1960.
- Das deutsche Märchen und die Brüder Grimm. Diederichs: Düsseldorf 1964.

== Sources ==
- Hugo Kuhn and Kurt Schier (ed.): Märchen, Mythos, Dichtung. Festschrift zum 90. Geburtstag Friedrich von der Leyens am 19. August 1963. Beck, München 1963.
- Karl Otto Conrady: Völkisch-nationale Germanistik in Köln. Eine unfestliche Erinnerung. SH-Verlag, Schernfeld 1990, ISBN 3-923621-66-3 (über Ernst Bertram und Friedrich von der Leyen).
- Ingeborg Glier (1985). "von der Leyen, Friedrich von der". Neue Deutsche Biographie (in German). Vol. 14. Berlin: Duncker & Humblot. pp. 433–434. (full text online).
- Michael Löffelsender: Möglichkeiten und Grenzen eines nationalsozialistischen Modefachs. Deutsche Volkskunde an der Universität Köln 1919–1945. In: Geschichte im Westen 23 (2008), S. 89–117 (pdf).
- Kurt Schier: Leyen, Friedrich von der. In: Enzyklopädie des Märchens, Band 8, 1996, Sp. 1005–1011.
