= Beiträge zur Geschichte der deutschen Sprache und Literatur =

- Discipline: German language and literature
- Language: primarily German, also English
- Edited by: Michael Stolz, Susanne Köbele, Svetlana Petrova, Renata Szczepaniak

Publication details
- History: 1874–present
- Publisher: Niemeyer (Germany)
- Frequency: Triannual

Standard abbreviations
- ISO 4: Beitr. Gesch. Dtsch. Sprache Lit.

Indexing
- ISSN: 0323-424X

Links
- Journal homepage

The Beiträge zur Geschichte der deutschen Sprache und Literatur (English: Contributions to the History of the German Language and Literature) is a German academic journal publishing articles on German language and literature. The particular focus is on the older periods and on the history and development of the German language.

The journal was founded by Hermann Paul and Wilhelm Braune in 1873; the first issue was published in 1874. The official abbreviation for the journal "PBB" derives from the alternate, unofficial name for the journal Pauls und Braunes Beiträge (English Hermann Paul's and Wilhelm Braune's Contributions).

When the German Democratic Republic (East Germany) was founded after World War II, the socialist government of the country nationalised the publishing house Max Niemeyer which was located in the East-German city of Halle an der Saale. However, the Niemeyer family left the GDR and settled in Tübingen in West Germany, where they continued their publishing house. Both the nationalised East-German Niemeyer publisher and the West-German Niemeyer continued publishing the Beiträge under the same name. The different editions from 1950 to 1990 are distinguished in bibliographies by the addition of the letter H for Halle (the East-German publication) or T for Tübingen (the West-German publication).

== Trivia ==
Many university libraries, when binding the separate volumes together, used red covers for the series from Halle, symbolising the red colour of the socialists, and some other colour (often green) for the West-German series.
