= Friedrich Kluge =

German philologist and educator (1856–1926)

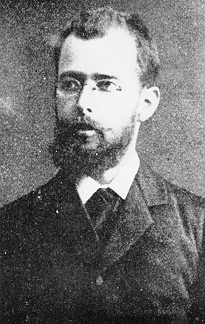
- Born: 21 June 1856; Cologne, Germany
- Died: 21 January 1926 (aged 69); Freiburg, Germany

Academic background
- Education: University of Strasbourg
- Academic advisor: Hermann Paul

Academic work
- Discipline: Germanic studies
- Sub-discipline: German philology
- Institutions: University of Jena; University of Freiburg
- Main interests: Germanic linguistics

Friedrich Kluge (21 June 1856 – 21 May 1926) was a German philologist and educator. He is known for the Etymological Dictionary of the German Language (Etymologisches Wörterbuch der deutschen Sprache), which was first published in 1883.

== Biography ==
Kluge was born in Cologne. He studied comparative linguistics and classical and modern philologies at the universities of Leipzig, Strasbourg and Freiburg. As a student, his instructors were August Leskien, Georg Curtius, Friedrich Zarncke and Rudolf Hildebrand at Leipzig and Heinrich Hübschmann, Bernhard ten Brink and Erich Schmidt at the University of Strasbourg.

He became a teacher of English and German philology at Strassburg (1880), an assistant professor of German at the University of Jena in 1884, a full professor in 1886, and in 1893 was appointed professor of German language and literature at Freiburg as a successor to Hermann Paul.

A Proto-Germanic sound law that he formulated in a paper in 1884 is now known as Kluge's law.

He died in Freiburg, Germany.

== Works ==
- Etymologisches Wörterbuch der deutschen Sprache (1881; 10th edition, 1924; 25th edition, 2011).
- Stammbildungslehre der altgermanischen Dialekte (2d edition, 1899).
- Von Luther bis Lessing, sprachgeschichtliche Aufsätze (4th edition, 1904).
- Angelsächsisches Lesebuch (3d edition, 1902).
- Deutsche Studentensprache (1895).
- English Etymology, in collaboration with Frederick Lutz (1898).
- Rothwelsch, Quellen und Wortschatz der Gaunersprache (1901).
- Mittelenglisches Lesebuch, glossary by Arthur Kölbing (1904; 2d edition, 1912).

For Hermann Paul's "Grundriss der germanischen Philologie" he wrote "Vorgeschichte der altgermanischen Dialekte" (1897) and "Geschichte der englischen Sprache" (1899). In 1900 he founded the journal "Zeitschrift für deutsche Wortforschung".

== See also ==
- Karl Müllenhoff
- Jan de Vries
