= Hermann Schneider (philologist) =

German philologist

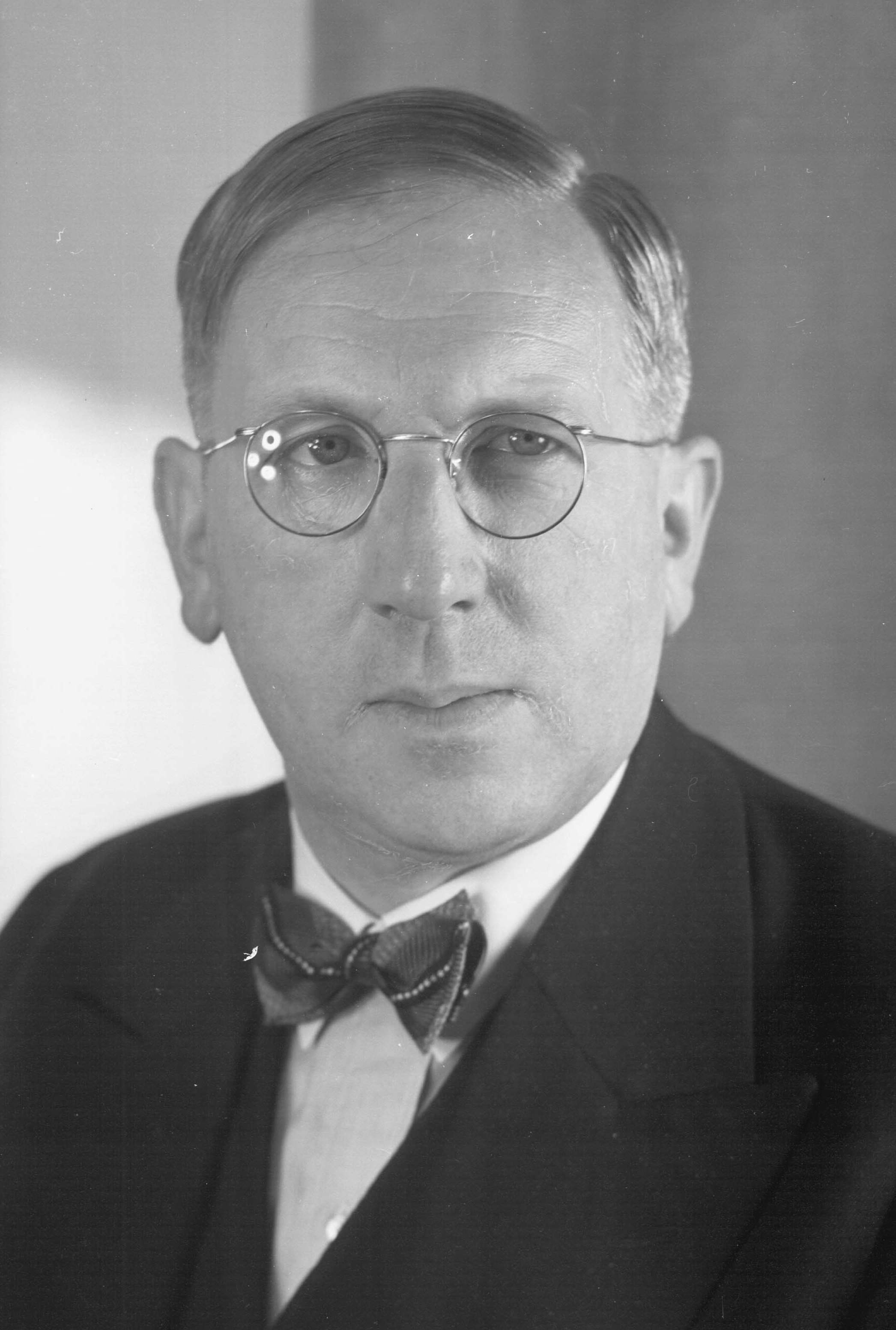
- Born: 12 August 1886; Zweibrücken, Germany
- Died: 9 April 1961 (aged 74); Tübingen, Germany

Academic background
- Education: Ludwig-Maximilians-Universität München; Friedrich Wilhelm University of Berlin
- Doctoral advisor: Erich Schmidt
- Other advisors: Friedrich von der Leyen; Hermann Paul; Andreas Heusler

Academic work
- Discipline: Germanic philology
- Sub-discipline: German philology; Old Norse philology
- Institutions: University of Bonn; Friedrich Wilhelm University of Berlin; University of Tübingen
- Main interests: German literature; Germanic mythology
- Notable works: Die Götter der Germanen (1938)

Hermann Schneider (12 August 1886 – 9 April 1961) was a German philologist who specialized in Germanic studies.

== Biography ==
Hermann Schneider was born in Zweibrücken, Germany on 12 August 1886. He studied at the Maximiliansgymnasium in Munich from 1895 to 1904. From 1904 to 1905, Schneider studied at the Ludwig-Maximilians-Universität München under Friedrich von der Leyen, Franz Muncker and Hermann Paul. From 1906 to 1910 he studied German and Romance philology at the Friedrich Wilhelm University of Berlin under Andreas Heusler, Richard M. Meyer, Erich Schmidt and Wolfgang Schulze.

Schneider received his Ph.D. at Berlin in 1910 under the supervision of Schmidt. Completing his habilitation in 1912, Schneider became a lecturer at the University of Bonn, where he in 1914 was appointed an associate professor. Since 1915 he was an associate professor at the University of Berlin. Since 1921, Schneider was Professor of German Language and Literature at the University of Tübingen. After 1945, he was Rector at the university.

Schneider was a member of many learned societies, including the Bavarian Academy of Sciences and Humanities, the Modern Language Association and the Royal Society of Arts and Sciences in Gothenburg. He retired from the university in 1951. Schneider died in Tübingen on 9 April 1961.

== Selected works ==
- Die Götter der Germanen, 1938

== Sources ==
- Christoph König (Hrsg.), unter Mitarbeit von Birgit Wägenbaur u. a.: Internationales Germanistenlexikon 1800–1950. Band 3: R–Z. De Gruyter, Berlin/New York 2003, ISBN 3-11-015485-4.
- Klaus von See (2007). "Schneider, Hermann". Neue Deutsche Biographie (in German). Vol. 23. Berlin: Duncker & Humblot. pp. 298–299. (full text online).
