= Henrik Williams =

Swedish runologist

- Born: Kalmar, Sweden
- Education: Uppsala University
- Awards: Rudbeck Medal (2014)
- Scientific career
- Workplaces: University of Illinois at Urbana–Champaign; Uppsala University

Henrik Williams is Swedish runologist, who is a Professor of Scandinavian Languages at Uppsala University, Sweden.

== Early life and education ==
Williams was born in Kalmar, Sweden. After graduating from school in his hometown, he spent a year as an exchange student in Ohio. After returning to Sweden in 1978, he settled in Uppsala and enrolled at Uppsala University. He studied Scandinavian languages, and in 1983, when he spent some time as a faculty assistant at the University of Illinois at Urbana–Champaign, he became interested in researching runestones. When returning to Sweden he wrote his PhD thesis on Swedish runestones.

== Career ==
=== Academic career ===
Williams received his PhD at Uppsala University in 1990 and became a senior lecturer, later associate professor, at the Department of Scandinavian languages at that university. In 1998, Williams served as visiting associate professor at University of California, Berkeley. Williams also held visiting professor position at University College London and University of Central Oklahoma in 2015 and 2017 respectively, and has had fellowships and positions as visiting professor at several academic institutions in Scandinavia.

Williams has been invited as a guest speaker and lecturer at various museums and institutions in Australia, the United Kingdom, the United States, and the Nordic countries.

=== Editorial work ===
From 2002 to 2008 and later from 2011 to 2014 Henrik Williams served as a member of the electoral college of the Disciplinary Domain of Humanities and Social Sciences subsequently becoming its board member. Since 2010, he serves as a co-editor of Futhark: International Journal of Runic Studies and is a member of the editorial board of Scripta Islandica. Williams is also a member of the American Association for Runic Studies.

== Awards and honors ==
- Fellow of the Centre for Advanced Study at the Norwegian Academy of Science and Letters, Oslo (2013-2014)
- Rudbeck Medal (2014)
