= Ernst Höpfner =

German educator and philologist

Ernst Höpfner (3 June 1836, Rawitsch – 28 February 1915, Göttingen) was a German educator and philologist.

== Biography ==
He studied philology at the Universities of Halle and Bonn, then engaged in study trips through France and England. In 1859, he became an Oberlehrer in Neuruppin, later serving as a director at the Realschule zum Heiligen Geist in Breslau (from 1868). In 1873, he was appointed Provinzialschulrat in Koblenz, and from 1888 onward, was associated with the Ministry of Culture in Berlin. Beginning in 1894, he served as a curator at the University of Göttingen.

In 1868, with philologist Julius Zacher, he founded the journal, Zeitschrift für deutsche Philologie. In 1890, he founded the Gesellschaft für deutsche Erziehungs- und Schulgeschichte ("Society for German education and school history").

== Principal works ==
- G.R. Weckherlin's Oden und Gesänge; ein Beitrag zur Geschichte der deutschen Dichtung, 1865 – Georg Rudolf Weckherlin's odes and hymns.
- Reformbestrebungen auf dem Gebiete der deutschen Dichtung des XVI. und XVII. Jahrhunderts, 1866 – Reform efforts in the field of German literature of the 16th and 17th century.
