= Eduard Neumann (philologist) =

German philologist

- Born: 24 June 1903; Osterholz-Scharmbeck, Germany
- Died: 28 March 1985 (aged 81); Berlin, Germany

Academic background
- Education: University of Marburg
- Doctoral advisor: Karl Helm

Academic work
- Discipline: Germanic philology
- Sub-discipline: German philology; Old Norse philology
- Institutions: University of Halle; Free University of Berlin
- Main interests: Old Norse literature

Eduard Neumann (24 June 1903 – 28 March 1985) was a German philologist who specialized in Germanic studies.

== Biography ==
Eduard Neumann was born in Osterholz-Scharmbeck, Germany on 24 June 1903. From 1922 to 1934 he studied theology and philosophy at the universities of Innsbruck and Oxford. From 1935 to 1939, Neumann studied German and Nordic philology at the University of Marburg under Karl Helm, Walther Mitzka and Ludwig Wolff. He received his Ph.D. with a thesis on the Eddas at Marburg in 1941 under the supervision of Helm and Wolff. He subsequently habilitated at Marburg in 1951 with another thesis on the Eddas.

Since 1951, Neumann lectured in Germanic philology at the University of Göttingen. In 1955 he was appointed a guest professor at the Free University of Berlin. He was a visiting professor at Ohio State University in 1956. From 1959 to 1971, Neumann was Professor of German Philology, Old German Studies and Nordic Studies at the Free University of Berlin. During this time, he also served as Director of the Germanic Seminar (1957-1971) and Rector (1959-1961).

Neumann retired in 1971, and died in Berlin on 28 March 1985. He is buried at Waldfriedhof Dahlem.

== See also ==
- Otto Höfler

== Sources ==
- Michael Fisch: Eduard Neumann. In: Christoph König (Hrsg.), unter Mitarbeit von Birgit Wägenbaur u. a.: Internationales Germanistenlexikon 1800–1950. Band 2: H–Q. De Gruyter, Berlin/New York 2003, ISBN 3-11-015485-4.
