= Friedrich Kauffmann =

German philologist (1863–1941)

- Born: 14 September 1863; Stuttgart, Kingdom of Württemberg (now Germany)
- Died: 14 July 1941 (aged 77); Berlin, Germany

Academic background
- Education: University of Tübingen
- Academic advisors: Alfred von Gutschmid; Erwin Rohde; Eduard Sievers; Hermann Paul

Academic work
- Discipline: Germanic philology
- Institutions: University of Kiel
- Main interests: Early Germanic literature; Germanic Antiquity; Germanic religion

Friedrich Kauffmann (14 September 1863 – 14 July 1941) was a German philologist who specialized in Germanic studies.

== Biography ==
Friedrich Kaufmann was born in Stuttgart, Germany on 14 September 1863. Kaufmann enrolled at the University of Tübingen in 1881, where he studied classical philology under Alfred von Gutschmid and Erwin Rohde, and Germanic philology under Eduard Sievers. He received his Ph.D. in 1886 with a thesis on the Old Saxon poem Heliand. During the work for his thesis, Kauffmann came in contact with Hermann Paul, who was to have a major impact on his future career.

From 1886 to 1888, Kaufmann worked on the Deutscher Sprachatlas at the University of Marburg under Georg Wenker. Kaufmann gained his habilitation at Marburg in 1887 with a thesis on the Swabian dialect. He was appointed an associate professor at the Martin Luther University of Halle-Wittenberg in 1892, and subsequently became a full professor at the University of Jena. From 1895 to 1928, Kauffmann was Chair of German Philology at the University of Kiel, where he served as Rector from 1904 to 1905. Kauffmann retired from Kiel in 1928, and died in Berlin on 14 July 1941.

Kauffmann specialized in Germanic studies. He was considered an expert on early Germanic literature, Germanic religion, and Germanic Antiquity, on which he authored a number of works. He was an advocate of interdisciplinary research, and sought to use philological, archaeological and historical evidence in his research. He played an instrumental role in paving the way for archaeological excavations at Hedeby. He was the father of art historian Hans Kauffmann.

== Selected works ==
- Der Vokalismus des Schwäbischen in der Mundart von Horb, 1887
- Geschichte der schwäbischen Mundart: Im Mittelalter und in der Neuzeit. Mit Textproben und einer Geschichte der Schriftsprache in Schwaben, 1890
- (Publisher) Aus der Schule des Wulfila. Auxenti Dorostorensis epistula de fide vita et obitu Wulfilae im Zusammenhang mit der Dissertatio Maximini contra Ambrosium, 1899
- Balder: Mythos und Sage; nach ihren dichterischen und religiösen Elementen untersucht, 1902

== See also ==
- Rudolf Much

== Sources ==
- Hans Kauffmann (1977). "Kauffmann, Friedrich". Neue Deutsche Biographie (in German). Vol. 11. Berlin: Duncker & Humblot. pp. 342–343. (full text online).
