= Klaus von See =

German philologist

- Born: 10 August 1927; Altendorf, Brome, Germany
- Died: 30 August 2013 (aged 86); Frankfurt, Germany
- Awards: Knight's Cross of the Order of the Falcon; Knight of the Order of the Dannebrog

Academic background
- Education: University of Hamburg
- Academic advisor: Hans Kuhn

Academic work
- Discipline: Germanic philology
- Sub-discipline: Old Norse philology
- Institutions: University of Frankfurt
- Main interests: Old Norse literature

Klaus von See (10 August 1927 – 30 August 2013) was a German philologist who specialized in Germanic studies.

== Biography ==
Klaus von See was born in the village of Altendorf, Brome, Germany on 10 August 1927. He studied history, German and Scandinavian philology at the University of Hamburg, receiving his doctorate there under the supervision of historian Hermann Aubin in 1953. After completing his legal studies, von See became greatly interested in Germanic and Scandinavian philology, and in 1957 he took up a position as an assistant at the Germanic Seminar at the University of Hamburg.

von See habilitated at the University of Kiel in 1962 with the thesis Altnordische Rechtswörter. Philologische Studien zur Rechtsauffassung und Rechtsgesinnung der Germanen, which examined terminology in early Germanic law, particularly Medieval Scandinavian law. His thesis was supervised by Hans Kuhn. The same year, von See was appointed Professor of Germanic Philology at the Goethe University Frankfurt. Here von See expanded the Nordic Department of the German Seminar, and 1976 he created an Institute for Scandinavian Studies under his leadership.

von See specialized in the study of Old Norse literature. He was the author of several works on Old Norse literature and Germanic studies. von See was a recipient of the Knight's Cross of the Order of the Falcon, a Knight of the Order of the Dannebrog, and an Honorary Life Member of the Viking Society for Northern Research.

von See retired from the Goethe University Frankfurt in 1995. He died in Frankfurt on 30 August 2013.

== Selected works ==
- Altnordische Rechtswörter. Philologische Studien zur Rechtsauffassung und Rechtsgesinnung der Germanen (Hermaea. New Series, vol. 16). Niemeyer, Tübingen 1962 (habilitation thesis).
- Germanische Verskunst (Sammlung Metzler). Metzler, Stuttgart 1967.
- Deutsche Germanen-Ideologie. Vom Humanismus bis zur Gegenwart. Athenäum-Verlag, Frankfurt/M. 1970.
- Germanische Heldensage. Stoffe, Probleme, Methoden; eine Einführung. 2. edition. VG Athenaion, Wiesbaden 1981, ISBN 3-7997-7032-1 (first edition: Wiesbaden 1971).
- Barbar, Germane, Arier. Die Suche nach der Identität der Deutschen. Winter, Heidelberg 1994, ISBN 3-8253-0210-5.
- Kommentar zu den Liedern der Edda. Winter, Heidelberg 1997–2019 (7 volumes, together with Beatrice La Farge, Katja Schulz et al.).
- Europa und der Norden im Mittelalter. Winter, Heidelberg 1999, ISBN 3-8253-0935-5.
- Die Göttinger Sieben. Kritik einer Legende (Beiträge zur neueren Literaturgeschichte/3; vol. 155). 3. edition. Winter, Heidelberg 2000, ISBN 3-8253-1058-2 (first edition: Heidelberg 1997).
- Freiheit und Gemeinschaft. Völkisch-nationales Denken in Deutschland zwischen Französischer Revolution und Erstem Weltkrieg. Winter, Heidelberg 2001, ISBN 3-8253-1217-8.
- Königtum und Staat im skandinavischen Mittelalter. Winter, Heidelberg 2002, ISBN 3-8253-1378-6 (dissertation, University of Hamburg).
- Texte und Thesen. Streitfragen der deutschen und skandinavischen Geschichte. Winter, Heidelberg 2003, ISBN 3-8253-1433-2 (with a preface by Julia Zernack).
- Ideologie und Philologie. Aufsätze zur Kultur- und Wissenschaftsgeschichte (Frankfurter Beiträge zur Germanistik; vol. 44). Winter, Heidelberg 2006, ISBN 3-8253-5221-8.

== Sources ==
- Gerd Wolfgang Weber (ed.): Idee, Gestalt, Geschichte. Studien zur europäischen Kulturtradition. Festschrift Klaus von See. University Press, Odense 1988, ISBN 87-7492-697-7 (with a preface Zu Werk und Wissenschaft des Germanisten Klaus von See and a bibliography of the works by Klaus von Sees until 1988 at pp. 713–719).
- Bibliographie Klaus von Sees von 1989 bis 2002. In: Texte und Thesen. Streitfragen der deutschen und skandinavischen Geschichte. Winter, Heidelberg 2003, ISBN 3-8253-1433-2, pp. 305–309.
- Kürschners Deutscher Gelehrten-Kalender 2009. 22. edition. K. G. Saur, München 2009, ISBN 978-3-598-23629-7.
- Notker Hammerstein: Die Johann Wolfgang Goethe Universität Frankfurt am Main, Bd. 2: Nachkriegszeit und Bundesrepublik 1945–1972. Wallstein-Verlag, Göttingen 2012, ISBN 978-3-8353-0550-2, pp. 567–570.
- Julia Zernack: Klaus von See 1927–2013. In: European Journal of Scandinavian Studies 44, 1 (2014), pp. 1–3.
