= Julius Zacher =

German Germanist

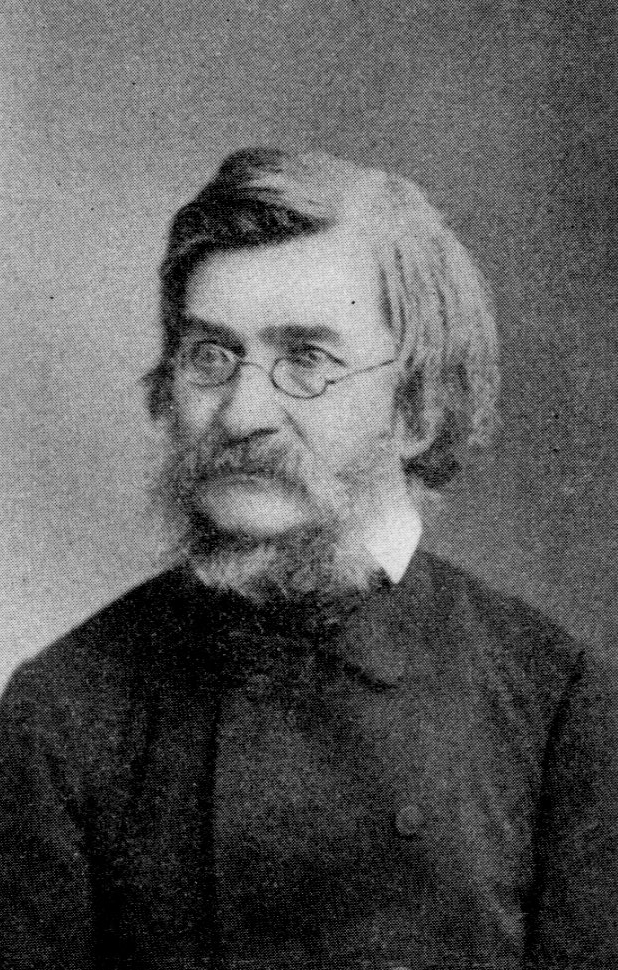
- Born: Ernst Julius August Zacher; February 5, 1816; Obernigk, Kingdom of Prussia
- Died: March 23, 1887 (aged 71); Halle, German Empire
- Known for: Co-founding the journal Zeitschrift für deutsche Philologie (1868) founding the Germanistische Handbibliothek (1869)

Academic background
- Education: University of Breslau

Academic work
- Discipline: Philology, German philology
- Institutions: University of Halle; University of Königsberg

Ernst Julius August Zacher (5 February 1816, Obernigk – 23 March 1887, Halle an der Saale) was a German philologist.

From 1836 to 1839, he studied theology and philology at the University of Breslau, where he attended lectures on German language and literature given by Hoffmann von Fallersleben. He then served as a private tutor under the employ of Graf von Wylich und Lottum. Afterwards, he travelled to the Berlin, where he studied under Karl Lachmann and the Brothers Grimm. In 1847, he began work at the university library in Halle and assumed duties as secretary of the Thüringisch-sächsischen Vereins zur Erforschung der vaterländischen Alterthümer (Thuringian-Saxon Society for the study of Patriotic Antiquities).

In 1853, he qualified as a lecturer at Halle with the thesis, Desquistionis grammaticae de alphabetic gothici ulphilani origine atque indoles particular. In 1856, he became an associate professor, and three years later, transferred to Königsberg as chair of German philology and chief librarian. In 1863, he returned as a professor to Halle, where he gave classes in German grammar, metrics and mythology.

In 1868, with Ernst Höpfner, he founded the journal, Zeitschrift für deutsche Philologie. In 1869, he founded the Germanistische Handbibliothek (German "reference library").

== Selected works ==
- Das Gothische Alphabet Vulfilas und das Runenalphabet : eine sprachwissenschaftliche Untersuchung, 1855 – The Gothic alphabet of Ulfilas and the Rune alphabet.
- Alexandri Magni iter ad paradisum / ex codd. mss latinis primus, 1859.
- Pseudocallisthenes; forschungen zur kritik und geschichte der ältesten aufzeichnung der Alexandersage, 1867 – Pseudo-Callisthenes; Research on the history and criticism of the oldest record of "Alexandersage".
