= Bernhard Kummer =

German philologist

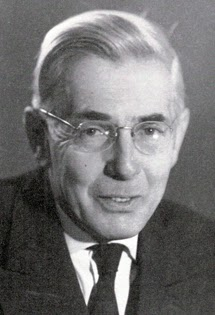
- Born: 21 January 1897; Leipzig, Germany
- Died: 1 December 1962 (aged 65); Klingberg, Scharbeutz, Germany

Academic background
- Education: Leipzig University
- Thesis: Midgards Untergang (1927)
- Doctoral advisor: Eugen Mogk; Hans Haas
- Other advisor: Gustav Neckel
- Influences: Jakob Wilhelm Hauer

Academic work
- Discipline: Germanic studies
- Institutions: University of Jena
- Main interests: Germanic religion

Bernhard Kummer (21 January 1897 in Leipzig – 1 December 1962 in Klingberg, Scharbeutz) was a Germanist who was appointed to a professorship in the Nazi era and whose writings have been influential among postwar neo-Nazis. He was a prominent representative of Nordicism, the view that the so-called Nordic race was inherently culturally advanced, and in books including his best known work, Midgards Untergang, he argues that the conversion of the Germanic peoples from their native Germanic paganism, particularly the Christianisation of Scandinavia, was detrimental to European culture.

== Career, writing and political activity ==
Kummer earned his doctorate at the University of Leipzig under the theologian Hans Haas, first publishing Midgards Untergang in 1927 as his doctoral thesis. A committed National Socialist, he joined the Nazi Party in 1928 (member number 87,841), was also a member of the SA, and wrote articles for Nazi publications beginning in 1927. He left the party in 1930 because membership was preventing him from obtaining a public post or scholarship and he was having difficulty providing for his family; Gustav Neckel had applied for a scholarship on his behalf in 1929. He rejoined the party only late in the Third Reich, but for reasons of conflict with other Nazis, not out of lack of commitment to its ideology; he requested readmission beginning in 1933, and was supported by the Association of National Socialist Dozents, which he represented in his division of the University of Jena. After the Nazis came to power, he lectured widely to party organisations and was a dozent at the Deutsche Hochschule für Politik in Berlin. From 1938 he belonged to the SA "Working Group for Weltanschauung and Culture". He never completed his habilitation (the two volumes published as Herd und Altar—Hearth and Altar—had been intended to serve that purpose) but taught at the University of Jena beginning in October 1936, and on 1 May 1942 was appointed Professor of Old Norse language and culture together with Germanic history of religion.

Kummer participated from its inception in 1927 in the Handwörterbuch des Deutschen Aberglaubens, a prestigious project. His articles are on the family and sexuality and also on goddesses and other female figures such as Mother Holle. He was an influential proponent of Nordicism, particularly as an important ideologue in the Nordische Gesellschaft and as the main author with the völkisch publishing house of Adolf Klein in Leipzig.

After the war, many of Kummer's works were banned in the Soviet Occupation Zone of Germany. However, like some other former Nazi academics, he was able to draw on friendships to continue working, emphasising Germanic democracy rather than the "Führer principle" in his postwar publications. He read a paper at the 8th International Congress for the History of Religions, in Rome in 1955. Along with other völkisch neopagans including Herman Wirth, he was active in the Deutsche Unitarier Religionsgemeinschaft (German Unitarian Religious Community).

Midgards Untergang in particular is still cited by neo-Nazis as scholarly evidence for their views.

== Views and dispute with Otto Höfler ==
Beginning with Midgards Untergang, Kummer propounded a view of ancient Germanic culture, influenced by Vilhelm Grønbech, as marked by a dualism reminiscent of Zoroastrian thought, between life-affirming Midgard and life-endangering Utgard. He argued that the Eddic poems already represented a weakened form of Germanic paganism because of both Christian influence and the adoption of Odin, an originally alien god, and that these divisive inroads by Utgard made possible the success of missionaries in converting the Germanic peoples: "the Norse Odin of the waning days of heathendom [constituted] a bridge between Germanic piety and Christian devil-belief". He regarded the conversion as a catastrophe, causing cultural decay and the eventual downfall (Untergang) of Midgard; hence his title recalling Oswald Spengler's The Decline of the West or The Downfall of the Occident (Der Untergang des Abendlandes). His views were influenced by significant anti-Catholicism; in his view, the ancient Teutons "and [their] gods coexisted in a relationship of mutual trust" and their ethics were based on custom and conscience, as opposed to dogma (as in Catholicism) or law (as in Judaism). He referred to Catholics as "the Praetorian Guard of Rome". In contrast to the Ariosophists, he regarded superstition and belief in witches as primitive traits imported into Germanic culture via Catholicism, rather than repositories of ancient native thought.

Kummer's publications show both deep knowledge and an increasingly strident political approach. In Midgards Untergang (1927) his main focus is on what can be learned of ancient Germanic culture from the sources; in Mission als Sittenwechsel (1933) he examines the effect of the "collective mental injury" of conversion and loss of culture; and in Der Machtkampf zwischen Volk, König und Kirche im alten Norden (Volume 2 of Herd und Altar, 1939), he ascribes to the conversion all the ills of his own time as he saw them: "usury, homelessness, mass culture, [loss of dignity], treason against blood and army, cowardice, the disregard of ancestral heritage, [failure to resist] the enticements of the day, corruption, disrespect of national interests, a [morality] of adultery, poverty among children, degeneration of motherly love, and intellectual disbelief." He acquired the deprecatory nickname "Germanenbernhard", which "hints at his character as a pettifogging and self-opinionated polemicist".

Kummer's academic career was retarded by a conflict with Otto Höfler which became part of the conflict between the Ahnenerbe and the Amt Rosenberg, with which Kummer was affiliated. Höfler originally fanned the flames of their disagreement with a dismissive treatment of Kummer's work in his Kultische Geheimbünde der Germanen (1934), but Kummer fought back "with almost every weapon he could get." Kummer attacked Höfler's version of the Germanic Continuity Theory as based on the equation of the ancient Teutons with primitives and therefore inherently denigratory. He accused the Catholic Höfler, whose work emphasises initiatory cults and secret societies, of "an un-Nordic predilection for strange rites and ecstatic practices". Höfler was able to point out the potential destructiveness of such sectarianism in the Third Reich, and his viewpoint easily supported the notion of National Socialism as the culmination of Germanic history, whereas Kummer had to resort to a reawakening of suppressed cultural forces. Heinrich Himmler intervened in the quarrel and Kummer was forced to withdraw his attacks on Höfler and resign from the journal Nordische Stimmen, which he had founded; only then did his academic career advance.

== Selected publications ==
- Midgards Untergang: Germanischer Kult und Glaube in den letzten heidnischen Jahrhunderten. Veröffentlichungen des Forschungsinstituts für Vergleichende Religionsgeschichte an der Universität Leipzig ser. 2 vol. 7. Leipzig: Pfeiffer, 1927. OCLC 3764058. Rev. ed. Leipzig: Klein, 1935. OCLC 250137354. 3rd enlarged ed. 1937.
- Mission als Sittenwechsel. Mit einer Antwort an Prof. D. Rückert: ′Die kulturelle und nationale Bedeutung der Missionierung Germaniens für das deutsche Volk′. Reden und Aufsätze zum nordischen Gedanken 1. Leipzig: Klein, 1933. OCLC 257425847
- Herd und Altar. Wandlungen altnordischer Sittlichkeit im Glaubenswechsel. Volume 1 Persönlichkeit und Gemeinschaft. Leipzig: Klein, 1934. Volume 2 Der Machtkampf zwischen Volk, König und Kirche im alten Norden. Leipzig: Klein, 1939. OCLC 46635994
- Germanenkunde im Kulturkampf: Beiträge zum Kampf um Wissenschaft, Theologie und Mythus des 20. Jahrhunderts. Reden und Aufsätze zum nordischen Gedanken 25. Leipzig: Klein, 1925. OCLC 29104451
- Gefolgschaft, Führertum und Freiheit. Vom Grundgesetz der Demokratie in alter Zeit. Zeven: Lienau, 1956. OCLC 73517235

== See also ==
- Edmund Mudrak
