= Hugo Gering =

German philologist

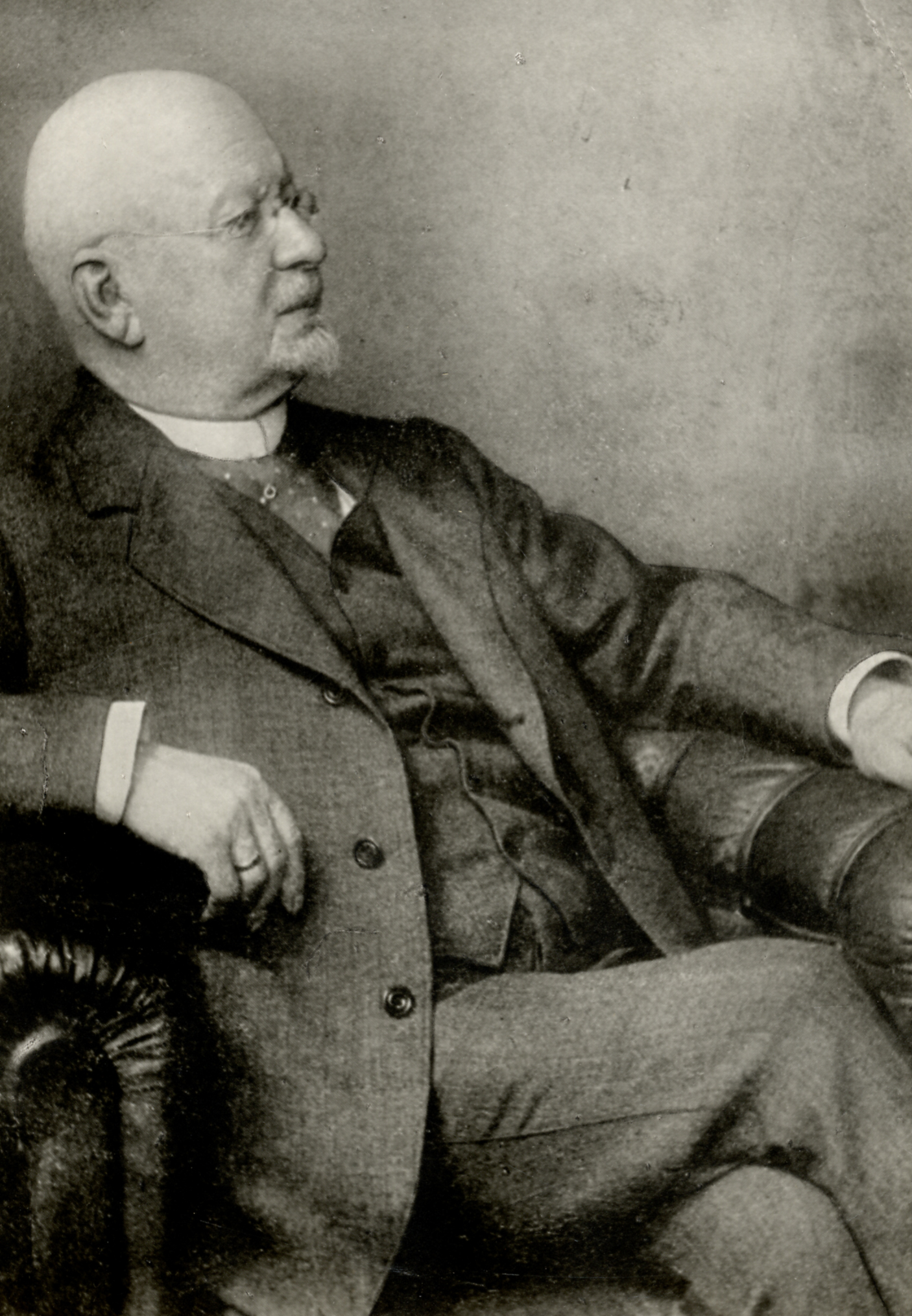
- Born: 21 September 1847; Lipienica, Prussia
- Died: 3 February 1925 (aged 77); Kiel, Germany

Academic background
- Education: University of Halle
- Doctoral advisor: Julius Zacher

Academic work
- Discipline: Germanic philology
- Sub-discipline: Old Norse philology
- Institutions: University of Halle; University of Kiel
- Doctoral students: Franz Rolf Schröder
- Main interests: Old English literature; Old Norse literature

Hugo Gering (21 September 1847 – 3 February 1925) was a German philologist who specialized in Germanic studies.

== Biography ==
Hugo Gering was born in Lipienica, Prussia on 21 September 1847. His father was a landowner. He was educated at Toruń and Chełmno. Since 1867, Gering studied philology, philosophy and history at the universities of Leipzig and Bonn. He served in the Prussian Army during the Franco-Prussian War. He subsequently gained his Ph.D. at the University of Halle under the supervision of Julius Zacher. His thesis was on the Gothic language.

Gering completed his habilitation in German philology at Halle in 1876. After several scholarly trips to Scandinavia, Gering was appointed an associate professor at the University of Halle in 1883. Since 1889 he was a professor at the University of Kiel, where he served as Rector from 1902 to 1903. Gering specialized in the study of early Germanic literature, particularly Old English, Gothic and Old Norse literature. His publications on the Eddas and Beowulf became standard works on the subjects.

Gering retired from the University of Kiel in 1921. He died in Kiel on 3 February 1925.

== Selected works ==
- 1882–83 Islendzk Æventýri - Isländische Legenden, Novellen und Märchen, 2 Bände. Halle. Open Library.
- 1887 Glossar zu den Liedern der Edda (Sæmundar Edda). Paderborn. 5. Aufl. 1923.
- 1892 Die Edda. Die Lieder der sogenannten älteren Edda. Übersetzung und Erläuterungen, Bibliographisches Institut Leipzig und Wien
- 1903 Vollständiges Wörterbuch zu den Liedern der Edda. Halle. Repr. Hildesheim 1971.
- 1904 Die Lieder der älteren Edda (Sæmundar Edda). 2. völlig umgearb. Aufl. der Ausg. v. Karl Hildebrand. Paderborn. 4. Aufl. 1922.
- 1906 Beowulf nebst dem Finnsburg-Bruchstück. Übersetzt und erläutert, Heidelberg.
- 1927–31 Kommentar zu den Liedern der Edda. 2 Bde. nach dem Tode Verfassers hrsgg. von Barend Sijmons. Halle.

== Sources ==
- "Gering, Hugo". Kulturstiftung der deutschen Vertriebenen. Archived from the original on 2020-12-30.
- "Hugo Gering". Kiel Directory of Scholars. 21 September 1847.
