= Konstantin Reichardt =

American philologist (1904–1976)

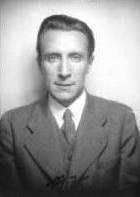
- Born: 30 April 1904; Saint Petersburg, Russian Empire
- Died: 19 January 1976 (aged 71); New Haven, Connecticut

Academic background
- Education: Humboldt University of Berlin
- Doctoral advisor: Gustav Neckel
- Other advisor: Friedrich von der Leyen

Academic work
- Discipline: Germanic philology
- Sub-discipline: German philology; Old Norse philology
- Institutions: University of Leipzig; University of Minnesota; Yale University
- Notable students: Warren Cowgill
- Main interests: Germanic Antiquity; Germanic religion; Old Norse literature; Runology

Konstantin Reichardt (30 April 1904 – 19 January 1976) was a Russian-born American philologist who specialized in Germanic studies.

== Biography ==
Konstantin Reichardt was born in Saint Petersburg, Russian Empire on 30 April 1904. His father was a merchant. From 1923 to 1927, Reichardt studied Indo-European linguistics, Germanic philology, Celtic philology and philosophy at the University of Berlin. He received his Ph.D. at Berlin 1927 under the supervision of Gustav Neckel. His thesis was on the skalds of the Viking Age.

From 1926 to 1927, Reichardt was a lecturer in Old Norse at the University of Berlin. From 1930 to 1931 he was an assistant of Friedrich von der Leyen at the University of Cologne. In 1930 he worked on the handling of German manuscripts at the Royal Library, Denmark. Reichardt was a assosicate professor of Nordic philology at the University of Leipzig from 1931 to 1937.

Reichardt emigrated to the United States in 1938, and subsequently served as visiting professor (1938-1939) and professor (1939-1945) of German and Nordic philology at the University of Minnesota. From 1942 to 1947 he was also professor of Russian language and literature at Minnesota. He became an American citizen in 1944. Since 1947, Reichardt was professor of German philology at Yale University. He died in New Haven, Connecticut on 19 January 1976.

== Selected works ==
- Das Himmelsbild der Germanen. Barth, Leipzig 1926.
- Studien zu den Skalden des 9. und 10. Jahrhunderts. Mayer & Müller, Leipzig 1928.
- Mythen und Märchen und germanische Götter. Insel, Leipzig 1933.
- Thule. Ausgewählte Sagas von altgermanischen Bauern und Helden. Diederichs, Jena 1934.
- Germanische Welt vor tausend Jahren. Diederichs, Jena 1936.
- Runenkunde. Diederichs, Jena 1936.

== Sources ==
- Theodore M. Andersson: Konstantin Reichardt. In: Christoph König (Hrsg.), unter Mitarbeit von Birgit Wägenbaur u. a.: Internationales Germanistenlexikon 1800–1950. Band 3: R–Z. De Gruyter, Berlin/New York 2003, ISBN 3-11-015485-4.
- Rudolf Vierhaus (Hrsg.): Deutsche Biographische Enzyklopädie. 2. Auflage. Band 8 [Poethen–Schlüter]. Saur, München 2007, S. 259.
- "Prof. Dr. phil. Konstantin Reichardt". University of Leipzig.
