= Andreas Heusler =

Swiss philologist (1865–1940)

- Born: 10 August 1865; Basel, Switzerland
- Died: 28 February 1940 (aged 74); Basel

Academic background
- Education: University of Freiburg

Academic work
- Discipline: Germanic studies
- Sub-discipline: Old Norse studies
- Institutions: University of Berlin
- Notable students: Gustav Neckel; Otto Höfler; Hermann Schneider
- Main interests: Early Germanic literature

Andreas Heusler (10 August 1865 – 28 February 1940) was a Swiss philologist who specialized in Germanic studies. He was a Professor of Germanic Philology at the University of Berlin and a renowned authority on early Germanic literature.

== Life ==
Andreas Heusler was born into a prestigious family in Basel, the third in a line of fathers and sons bearing the same name (his father was Andreas Heusler (1834–1921) and his grandfather Andreas Heusler (1802–1868); both worked in law and government). Andreas enjoyed a stellar career as a student in Basel, Freiburg im Breisgau, and Berlin, completing his studies in 1887 in Freiburg with the doctoral thesis "Beitrag zum Consonantismus der Mundart von Baselstadt" ("A Contribution on Consonantism in the Dialect of Basel").

In 1890, when Heusler was 25 years old, he began lecturing in Berlin and was a professor of Nordic textual studies there from 1894 to 1913. He focused on research into Old Norse literature, especially the Poetic Edda and Íslendingasögur, translating many works into German and traveling twice to Iceland. From 1914 to 1919, Heusler was professor of Germanic textual studies at Berlin University. He moved back to Switzerland in 1920 and lived in Arlesheim near Basel, where a place was made for him at Basel University, where he worked until he reached the age limit in 1936.

Besides ancient Germanic and Nordic culture, Heusler was noted for his love of music (he played the violin); around 1889 he switched from a strongly held Christianity to being a confirmed atheist. There is some debate as to where Heusler stood on German nationalism in the 1930s. He seems at first to have been swayed by it, but it is thought that he turned his back on Adolf Hitler around 1938. A good insight into his thoughts is offered by the four hundred letters to Wilhelm Ranisch which he wrote in the period 1890–1940.

In 1893, Heusler married the singer Auguste Hohenschild, who was fourteen years his senior. The marriage was unhappy and they divorced in 1922, having been separated since 1901. Heusler died in Basel in 1940 after a short illness.

== Influence ==
Andreas Heusler was among the most influential figures in early Germanic studies in the first half of the twentieth century, and much of his work still resonates today, including the more questionable field propositions concerning "German-dom" and their reflection in early philological work. In particular, the conceptualization of "German" as rooted in Germanic tribes is today often seen as a back projection with real-life consequences for some speakers of German (see One Standard German Axiom).

== Writings (selection) ==
- Der Ljóþaháttr, eine metrische untersuchung, Berlin: Mayer & Müller 1889.
- (Ed.): Zwei Isländer-Geschichten. Die Hønsna-þóres und die Bandamanna saga, Berlin: Weidmannsche Buchhandlung 1897, 2nd edn 1913.
- (Trans.): Die Geschichte vom Hühnerthorir, eine altisländische Saga, Berlin 1900.
- Die Lieder der Lücke im Codex Regius der Edda, Strasbourg 1902, extracted from Germanistische Abhandlungen. Hermann Paul zum 17. März 1902 dargebracht.
- (Ed.): Eddica minora. Dichtungen eddischer Art aus den Fornaldarsögur und anderen Prosawerken, Dortmund 1903, with Wilhelm Ranisch.
- Lied und Epos in germanischer Sagendichtung. Dortmund: Ruhfus 1905.
- Die gelehrte Urgeschichte im altisländischen Schrifttum, Berlin 1908.
- Das Strafrecht der Isländersagas, Leipzig 1911.
- Altisländisches Elementarbuch. Heidelberg: Winter 1913.
- (Trans.): Die Geschichte vom weisen Njal. Jena: Diederichs 1914. (Thule, altnordische Dichtung und Prosa, 4 / ed. Felix Niedner).
- Die Anfänge der isländischen Saga, Berlin 1914.
- Die altgermanische Dichtung. Berlin: Athenaion 1923.
- Deutsche Versgeschichte. Berlin: de Gruyter 1925–1929 (3 vols)
- Nibelungensage und Nibelungenlied, die Stoffgeschichte des deutschen Heldenepos, 3. útg., Dortmund 1929.
- Germanentum. Vom Lebens- und Formgefühl der alten Germanen, Heidelberg 1934.
- Einfälle und Bekenntnisse. Basel 1935.
- Codex Regius of the Elder Edda, Copenhagen 1937. — facsimile of the Codex Regius. Corpus Codicum Islandicorum Medii Aevi, 10.
- (Trans.): Isländisches Recht. Die Graugans, Weimar 1937.
- Kleine Schriften 1–2, Berlin 1943–1969.
- Schriften zum Alemannischen. Berlin: de Gruyter 1970.

== See also ==
- Hugo Gering
- Rudolf Much

== Sources ==
- (in Italian) Laura Mancinelli: La Nibelungenforschung di Andreas Heusler alla luce della critica più recente, Turin 1965.
- Arthúr Björgvin Bollason: Andreas Heusler in Island. Germanentum im Fin de siècle, Basel 2006, 62–85.
- Germanentum im Fin de siècle. Wissenschaftsgeschichtliche Studien zum Werk Andreas Heuslers. Basel: Schwabe, 2006. ISBN 978-3-7965-2163-8
- "Andreas Heusler". Berlin-Brandenburg Academy of Sciences and Humanities.
