= Dennis Howard Green =

English philologist

- Born: 26 June 1922; Bournemouth, England
- Died: 5 December 2008 (aged 86); Cambridge, England
- Spouses: Dorothy Warren (m. 1947; div. 1972) Margaret Parry (m. 1972; died 1997) Sarah Redpath (m. 2001)
- Children: 1

Academic background
- Education: University of Cambridge; University of Basel
- Thesis: Konrads Trojanerkrieg und Gottfrieds Tristan. Vorstudien zum Gotischen Stil in der Dichtung
- Doctoral advisor: Friedrich Ranke

Academic work
- Discipline: Germanic philology
- Sub-discipline: German philology
- Institutions: University of Cambridge
- Notable students: Hans Frede Nielsen; David Yeandle
- Main interests: Germanic Antiquity; Germanic linguistics; Medieval German literature
- Notable works: The Carolingian Lord (1965); Irony in the Medieval Romance (1979); Language and history in the early Germanic world (1998)

Dennis Howard Green FBA (26 June 1922 – 5 December 2008) was an English philologist who was Schröder Professor of German at the University of Cambridge. He specialized in Germanic philology, particularly the study of Medieval German literature, Germanic languages and Germanic antiquity. Green was considered one of the world's leading authorities in these subjects, on which he was the author of numerous influential works.

== Early life and education ==
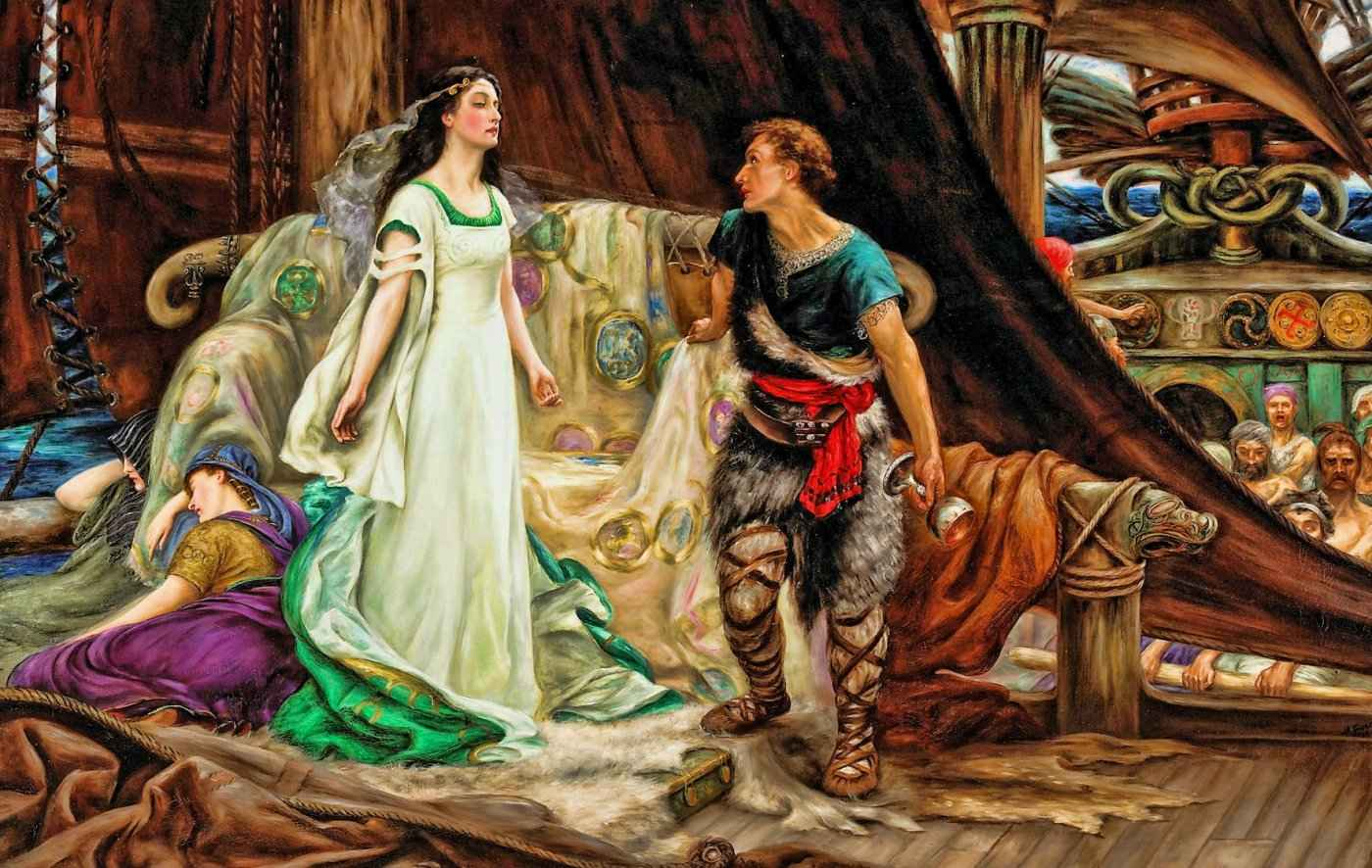
Tristan and Isolde by Herbert James Draper (1901). Green's Ph.D. thesis concerned the work Tristan and Iseult.

Dennis Howard Green was born in Bournemouth, England, on 26 June 1922, the son of Herbert Maurice Green and Agnes Edith Flemming. Just before World War II, at the age of eighteen, Green enrolled at Trinity College, Cambridge to study German.

During the war, Green temporarily abandoned his studies to serve in the Royal Tank Regiment, where he rose to the rank of major and participated in the Normandy landings. During this time it is probable that he was a member of British intelligence. During the war, Green was once arrested for having spoken Dutch with a German accent, and in May 1945, he organised a military transport to Halle to enable him to acquire a complete set of Niemeyer medieval texts in exchange for rations. The discipline and order which Green became accustomed to in the military would become key characteristics of his future career.

Returning to his studies at Cambridge after the war, Green gained his B.A. at Cambridge in 1946. He developed a strong scholarly interest in Germanic philology and Medieval German literature. Unable to conduct his future studies in war-ravaged Germany as he preferred, Green opted for the University of Basel, where he gained his Ph.D. in 1949 under the supervision of Friedrich Ranke. Ranke, who had been dismissed and exiled by the Nazis, was a known authority on Gottfried von Strassburg's Tristan. Green's Ph.D. thesis was a comparative study of the style of Konrad von Würzburg's Der trojanische Krieg and Gottfried's Tristan. Along with Frederick Pickering, Green became one of a selected group of elite British Germanists with qualifications from leading German-language universities.

== Early career ==
Green was Lecturer in German at the University of St Andrews from 1949 to 1950. He was elected to a Research Fellowship at Trinity College, Cambridge, in 1949, which he continued to hold for the rest of his life. Green gained an M.A. at Cambridge in 1950, and was University Lecturer in German at Cambridge from 1950 to 1966.

A polyglot, Green spoke not only English and German, but also Portuguese, Romanian, Chinese and other languages, and was thoroughly acquainted with medieval languages and literatures, both Germanic and Romance. This enabled him to draw upon a wealth of sources for his works. From 1956 to 1979 Green was Chair of the Department of Other Languages at Cambridge. Apart from German, it covered a wide variety of languages, including Dutch, Portuguese, Hungarian and Greek.

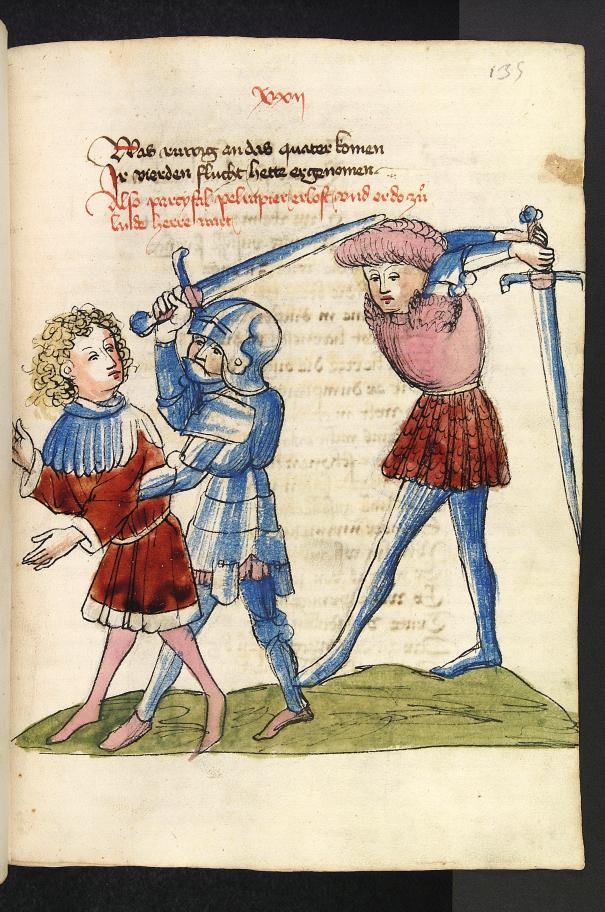
Illuminated manuscript page of Parzival. Green was a known authority on Parzival and other pieces of Medieval German literature.

Green's The Carolingian Lord (1965) was a semantic study of forms of address for sovereign authority in Old High German. It drew upon a wide array of sources, including Old Saxon, Old English, Gothic, Old Norse and Latin. It established him as an international authority on medieval German studies. Aided by the widespread acclaim which The Carolingian Lord received, Green was from 1966 to 1979 Chair of Modern Languages at Cambridge.

== Schröder Professor of German ==
In 1979 Green was elected Schröder Professor of German at Cambridge, succeeding Leonard Wilson Forster. He ran his Department of German with a firm hand, but was known as a brilliant teacher for those who were able to keep up with his pace. Among his more notable students was David Yeandle.

Combined with his duties at Cambridge, Green was a productive writer. In 1975, he published all of the twenty book reviews for the Modern Language Review, which subsequently gave rise to Lex Green, whereby the editors of this journal were limited to permitting the publication of three reviews per person a year.

In his Approaches to Wolfram von Eschenbach (1978), which he wrote with his colleague Leslie Peter Johnson, and The art of recognition in Wolfram's Parzival (1982), Green made a significant contribution to the study of Wolfram von Eschenbach's Parzival. Parzival was one of Green's favourite works, and he made a point of reading it once a year. His Irony in the Medieval Romance (1979) examined a vast amount of textual and literary sources of medieval romance from a comparative perspective, and is considered a pioneering work.

Green was one of few medieval Germanists who were thoroughly acquainted with both Medieval German and Medieval French literature, and eagerly studied the two from a comparative perspective. He notably analyzed Medieval German literature within the whole range of the Germanic languages, and in the context of the Christianization of the Germanic peoples. Unlike many other Germanists, Green consistently wrote his monographs on Medieval German literature in English, which made them available to a broader audience.

== Retirement from Cambridge ==
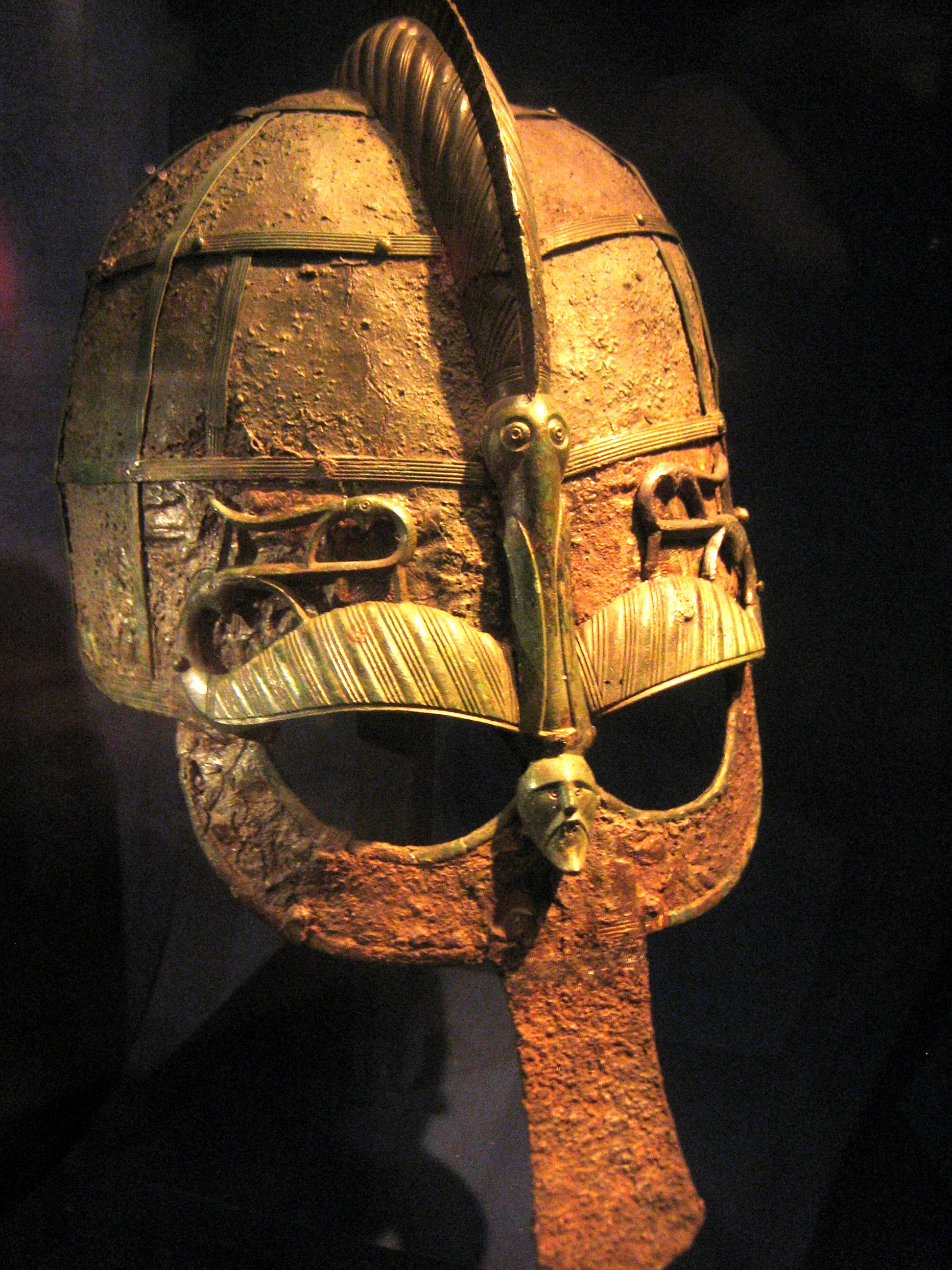
Vendel Period (Germanic Iron Age) helmet at the Swedish Museum of National Antiquities. Researching early Germanic culture and history was one of Green's greatest scholarly interests.

Green retired from Cambridge in 1989, and was elected a Fellow of the British Academy the same year. He was succeeded by Roger Paulin. Green was along with Arthur Thomas Hatto the only medieval Germanist who was a Fellow of the Academy, and became an influential figure there. His retirement ushered in a wave of scholarly productivity. His Medieval Listening and Reading (1994) examined orality and literacy in Medieval Europe.

In 1998, Green returned to his scholarly roots by publishing Language and history in the early Germanic world. It examines major aspects of the culture of the early Germanic peoples, including the subjects of religion, law, kinship, warfare and kingship. Drawing upon the evidence from no less than twelve Germanic languages, it also examines contacts early Germanic peoples had with their non-Germanic neighbours, and their contacts with Christianity. Intended for both a scholarly and general readership, it gained a wide audience.

Green was a member of several learned societies, including Modern Humanities Research Association and the International Association for Germanic Studies (IVG), of which he at one point served as Vice-President. He was a founding member of an interdisciplinary group of scholars which met annually in San Marino to discuss the Germanic peoples and languages, and he edited a collection of essays by this group published in 2003.

Green continued writing books and book reviews well into his 80s. His monographs from this time, such as The Beginnings of Medieval Romance: fact and fiction 1150–1220 (2002) and Women Readers in the Middle Ages (2007), covered topics recently made relevant by critical theory, such as reading, listening, orality, literacy and the role of women.

== Death and legacy ==
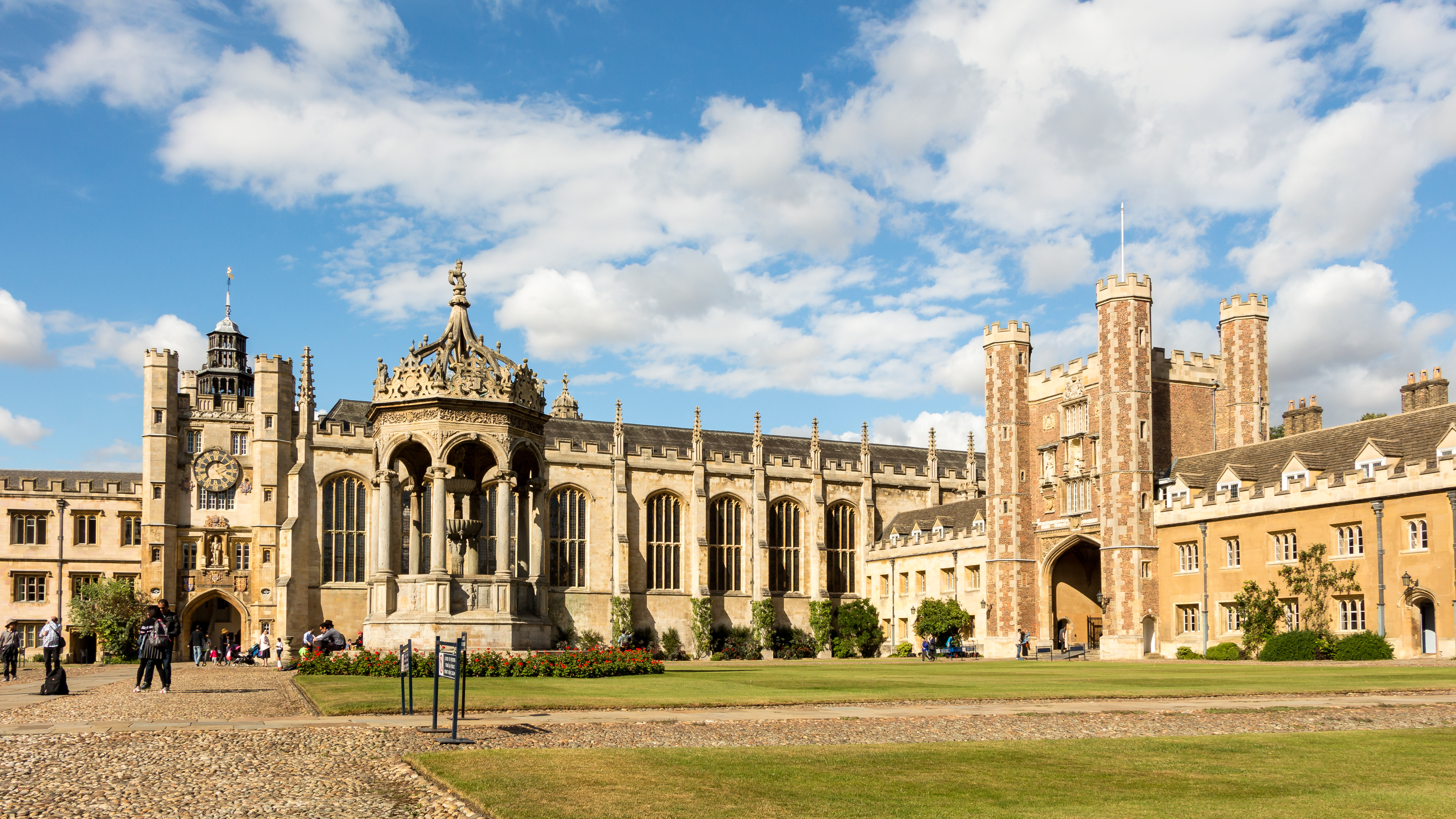
Picture of Trinity College, Cambridge, with which Green was affiliated throughout his entire adult life.

Green died on 5 December 2008. His final monograph, Women and marriage in German medieval romance (2009), which he had completed a few weeks before his death, was published posthumously by Cambridge University Press. At the time of his death, Green was working on a draft for a book on authorship in medieval literature.

For more than half a century, Green was one of the most distinguished scholars of Cambridge, and he has been described as one of the last representatives of the so-called Cambridge tradition, dating back to the nineteenth century, in which the study of literature proceeded from philology and scholars of literature were thoroughly trained in historical linguistics. Following the death of Green, there remained few, if any, scholars in the United Kingdom with the broad competence in Germanic linguistics and philology which he had. He was largely responsible for making Cambridge the pre-eminent British institution on the study of Medieval German literature.

After his death the D. H. Green Fund was established at the University of Cambridge "for the encouragement of medieval German studies".

== Personal life ==
Green married Dorothy Warren in 1947. They had one daughter, and divorced in 1972. On 17 November 1972 he married Margaret Parry, who died in 1997. In 2001 Green married Sarah Redpath. A man of great wanderlust, Green made many exotic journeys during his life, including travelling the Silk Road and Machu Picchu.

== See also ==
- Brian O. Murdoch
- Winfred P. Lehmann
- Hermann Reichert
- Otto Höfler
- Georg Baesecke
- Jan de Vries (philologist)

== Selected works ==
- Green, D.H. (1965). The Carolingian lord : semantic studies on four Old High German words: balder, frô, truhtin, hêrro. Cambridge: Cambridge University Press.
- ———— (1966). The Millstätter Exodus : a crusading epic. Cambridge: Cambridge University Press.
- Green, D.H.; Johnson, L.P (1978). Approaches to Wolfram von Eschenbach : five essays. Bern: Peter Lang. ISBN 3261029080.
- Green, D.H. (1979). Irony in the medieval romance. Cambridge: Cambridge University Press. ISBN 0521224586.
- ———— (1982). The art of recognition in Wolfram's Parzival. Cambridge: Cambridge University Press. ISBN 0521245001.
- ———— (1994). Medieval listening and reading : the primary reception of German literature 800-1300. Cambridge: Cambridge University Press. ISBN 0521444934.
- ———— (1998). Language and history in the early Germanic world. Cambridge: Cambridge University Press. ISBN 0521471346.
- ———— (2002). The beginnings of medieval romance : fact and fiction, 1150-1220. Cambridge: Cambridge University Press. ISBN 0521813999.
- ———— (2007). Women readers in the Middle Ages. Cambridge: Cambridge University Press. ISBN 9780521879422.
- ———— (2009). Women and marriage in German medieval romance. Cambridge: Cambridge University Press. ISBN 9780521513357.

== Sources ==
- "Dennis Howard Green". Contemporary Authors. Gale. 22 May 2001.
- Palmer, Nigel (9 May 2009). "Memorial for Dennis Howard Green". Trinity College Cambridge Annual Record. Trinity College, Cambridge: 119–125. Archived from the original on 11 November 2020.
- Paulin, Roger (18 December 2008). "Professor Dennis Green". The Independent.
- Paulin, Roger (2009). "Professor Dennis Howard Green". Trinity College Cambridge Annual Record. Trinity College, Cambridge: 117–119. Archived from the original on 11 November 2020.
- University of Cambridge (2021). "Statutes and Ordinances. Chapter XII Trusts" (PDF). p. 871.
- "Green, Prof. Dennis Howard". Who's Who. doi:10.1093/ww/9780199540884.013.U18001. ISBN 978-0-19-954089-1.
