= Language and History in the Early Germanic World =

1998 book by Dennis Howard Green

- Author: Dennis Howard Green
- Language: English
- Subject: Early Germanic culture
- Publisher: Cambridge University Press
- Publication date: 1998
- Publication place: United Kingdom
- Pages: 438
- ISBN: 0-521-47134-6 (hardback)
- OCLC: 468327031

Language and history in the early Germanic world is a book by Dennis Howard Green, the Schröder Professor of German at the University of Cambridge. It was published in hardback by Cambridge University Press in 1998. The book uses linguistic evidence for the study of early Germanic culture and history. A paperback edition was published by Cambridge University Press in 2000. An Italian translation was published in 2015.

== See also ==
- Altgermanische Religionsgeschichte
- Early Germanic Literature and Culture
- Germanische Altertumskunde Online
- The Early Germans

== Sources ==
- Beck, Heinrich (2001). "Dennis Howard Green. Language and History in the early Germanic World". Zeitschrift für deutsche Philologie. 99 (3). Erich Schmidt Verlag: 430–432. doi:10.37307/j.1868-7806.2001.03.10. ISSN 1868-7806.
- Getty, Michael (2000). "Language and History in the Early Germanic World. D. H. Green". Anthropological Linguistics. 42 (1). Indiana University: 118–121. JSTOR 30028750.
- Hugus, Frank (2000). "D. H. Green. Language and History in the Early Germanic World". Speculum. 75 (2). University of Chicago Press: 470–472. doi:10.2307/2887606. JSTOR 2887606.
- Kalinke, Marianne (April 2000). "Green, Dennis Howard. Language and History in the Early Germanic World". The German Quarterly. 73 (4). Wiley-Blackwell: 417–?. doi:10.2307/3072762. JSTOR 3072762.
- Murdoch, Brian (April 2000). "Language and History in the Early Germanic World. By D. H. Green". Modern Language Review. 95 (2). Modern Humanities Research Association: 548–549. doi:10.2307/3736222. JSTOR 3736222.
- Ohl, P. (2002). "Dennis Howard Green, Language and History in the Early Germanic World". Linguistische Berichte. 191. Helmut Buske Verlag: 367–374. ISSN 0024-3930.
- Reichert, Hermann (2000). "Dennis H. Green. Language and History in the Early Germanic World". Zeitschrift für deutsches Altertum und deutsche Literatur. 129 (3). S. Hirzel Verlag: 327–338. JSTOR 20659142.
- Robinson, Orrin W. (July 2000). "Language and History in the Early Germanic World. By D. H. Green". Journal of English and Germanic Philology. 99 (3). University of Illinois Press: 412–414. JSTOR 27711980.
- Salmons, Joseph C. (January 2000). "Language and history in the early Germanic world. By D. H. Green". Diachronica. 17 (1). John Benjamins Publishing Company: 161–165. doi:10.1075/dia.17.1.11sal. ISSN 0176-4225.
- Suzuki, Seiichi (June 2001). "Language and history in the early Germanic world. By D. H. Green". Journal of Germanic Linguistics. 13 (2). Cambridge University Press: 412–414. doi:10.1017/S1470542701005426. S2CID 170956636.
