= Li Tournoiement as dames =

Li Tournoiement as dames (The Ladies' Tournament) is part of a medieval German short story collection called Mären. This collection was written (or at least composed), by an anonymous author shortly before 1300. While scholars have featured it as a type of French fabliau (being contested due to the varying ownership of Alsace-Lorraine), it has stood out as a "unique" or "experimental" text for its time. It is studied as a text in German and French Medieval literature.

== Plot ==
The characters in the story come from an elite/upper class status. Their society is composed of knights and is heavily involved in battle. Chivalry and honor are held in high regard. When their land is attacked the men are forced to leave for war, leaving the women behind in a community of their own. In this new society the women settle disputes by holding discussions among themselves, and leadership is won by developing the best rhetorical skills. During a debate on whether or not women gain or share the same honor as men a challenge is presented to the group, "the women are to put on the men's armor, mount the men's warhorses, and joust against each other in the pursuit of honor." In the battle the woman who wins is deemed the poorest among them, being forced to ride bearing the name of a famous knight, rather than a familial one. Once their victory story has traveled through the land and reached the famous knight, he comes to meet this poor maiden, pities her, gives her a dowry and marries her off to a rich man.

== Scholarly importance ==
This text gives insight to the marriage system present in medieval central European society, and its closes tie with the importance of status. It also reveals to what degree women may have been involved in medieval French militancy.
