= Brian O. Murdoch =

English philologist (born 1944)

- Born: 26 June 1944 (age 82); London, England
- Spouse: Ursula Irene Riffer (m. 1967)
- Children: 2

Academic background
- Education: University of Exeter; Jesus College, Cambridge

Academic work
- Discipline: Philology
- Sub-discipline: German philology
- Institutions: University of Glasgow; University of Illinois at Chicago; University of Stirling
- Main interests: Celtic literature; Early Germanic literature; Medieval German literature
- Notable works: The Germanic Hero (1996); (Co-editor) Early Germanic Literature and Culture (2004)

Brian Oliver Murdoch FRHistS (born 26 June 1944) is a British philologist who is Emeritus Professor of German at the University of Stirling. He specializes in the study of early Germanic and Celtic literature, on which he has authored and edited several influential works.

== Biography ==
Brian O. Murdoch was born in London, England, on 26 June 1944, the son of Cecil O. and Jane A. Murdoch. He gained his B.A. first class honours from the University of Exeter, and his PhD from Jesus College, Cambridge, in 1969.

From 1968 to 1970, Murdoch was lecturer in German at the University of Glasgow. From 1970 to 1972, he was Assistant Professor of German at the University of Illinois at Chicago. From 1972 to 2007, he served as lecturer, senior lecturer and from 1991 professor of German at the University of Stirling. He received an A.Mus. from Trinity College London in 1982, was Visiting Fellow at Trinity Hall, Cambridge, in 1989, received a Litt.D. from Jesus College, Cambridge, in 1992, and was a Fellow at the University of Oxford in 1994 and 2002.

Murdoch retired from Stirling as Emeritus Professor in 2007, but is still involved with the school. He continues to write and research. Murdoch is a Fellow of the Royal Historical Society, and a member of the editorial board of the Medieval and Renaissance Authors and Texts series, published by Brill.

== Research ==
Murdoch teaches early Germanic and Celtic literature, on which he has authored and edited a number of notable works. He has translated works of medieval literature, such as Kudrun, into the English language.

Murdoch is particularly interested in religious texts. His earliest work is concerned with the Altdeutsche Genesis and other German Adam Books, later exploring the same theme in other vernaculars. In several hundred published works he established the centrality of the "popular" (as opposed to the exegetical) understanding of the "protoplasts" in far wider areas of medieval thought than had hitherto been appreciated. He demonstrated that an awareness of Adam motifs allows an entirely new reading of some of the classics of medieval literature, most notably Hartmann's Gregorius. The broader impact of these studies has been to raise awareness of vernacular Bible traditions in many aspects of Medieval Studies.

Murdoch is also known for his work on Erich Maria Remarque, author of All Quiet on the Western Front.

== Personal life ==
On 25 March 1967, Murdoch married Ursula Irene Riffer, a teacher, with whom he has a son and a daughter.

== Select bibliography ==
- The Fall of Man in the Early Middle High German Biblical Epic, Kuemmerle, 1972.
- The Recapitulated Fall: A Comparative Study in Medieval Literature, Rodopi, 1974.
- (Editor with David Wells and Roy Wisbey, and Contributor) Concordances to the Early Middle High German Biblical Epic, Cambridge University Press, 1976.
- The Irish Adam and Eve Story from Saltair na Rann, Volume II: Commentary, Institute for Advanced Studies, 1976.
- (With John S. Groseclose) Die althochdeutschen poetischen Denkmaeler, Metzler, 1976.
- (Editor with Lewis Jillings) Martin Luther: Selections, New German Studies, 1977.
- Hans Folz and the Adam Legends: Texts and Studies, Rodopi, 1977.
- (With Malcolm Read) Siegfried Lenz, Wolff (London), 1978.
- (Editor with Mark G. Ward) Studies in Modern Austrian Literature, Scottish Papers in Germanic Studies, 1981.
- Old High German Literature, Twayne, 1983.
- (Editor with Mark G. Ward) Studies in Nineteenth Century Austrian Literature, Scottish Papers in Germanic Studies, 1983.
- (Editor) Erich Maria Remarque, Im Westen nichts Neues, Methuen, 1984, revised edition, Routledge & Kegan Paul, 1988.
- (Editor) Stefan Zweig, Schachnovelle, Methuen, 1986.
- Kudrun: A New Translation with an Introduction and Notes, Dent, 1987.
- Fighting Songs and Warring Words: Popular Lyrics of the Two World Wars, Routledge & Kegan Paul, 1989.
- Walthari: A Verse Translation of the Medieval Latin Waltharius, with Introduction and Notes, Scottish Papers in Germanic Studies, 1989.
- Remarque: Im Westen nichts Neues, Glasgow University French and German Publications, 1991.
- Cornish Literature, D. S. Brewer, 1993.
- (Translator) Erich Maria Remarque, All Quiet on the Western Front, Bodley Head, 1993.
- (Editor and Translator) The Dedalus Book of Medieval Literature: The Grin of the Gargoyle, Dedalus, 1995.
- The Germanic Hero: Politics and Pragmatism in Early Medieval Poetry, Hambledon Press, 1996.
- Adam's Grace: Fall and Redemption in Medieval Literature, D. S. Brewer, 2000.
- (Translator and author of afterword) Pressler, Mirjam Shylock's Daughter, P. Fogelman Books, 2001.
- Murdoch, Brian; Tasioulas, J. A., eds. (2002). The apocryphal lives of Adam and Eve. Exeter: University of Exeter Press. ISBN 9780859896986.
- (Translator) Pressler, Mirjam Malka, Philomel Books, 2003.
- The Medieval Popular Bible: Expansions of Genesis in the Middle Ages. Cambridge D. S. Brewer, 2003.
- (Editor with Malcolm Read, and Contributor) Early Germanic Literature and Culture, Camden House, 2004
- The Apocryphal Adam and Eve in Medieval Europe: Vernacular Translations and Adaptations of the Vita Adae et Evae. Oxford University Press. 2009.
- Gregorius: An Incestuous Saint in Medieval Europe and Beyond. Oxford University Press. 2012.
- (Editor and translator) Old High German Poetry: An Anthology. Uppsala Books. 2025

== See also ==
- Dennis Howard Green
- Leslie Peter Johnson

== Sources ==
- "Brian (Oliver) Murdoch". Contemporary Authors. Gale. 23 September 2002.
- "Brian (Oliver) Murdoch Murdoch". The Writers Directory. St. James Press. 2018 – via Gale.
- "Professor Brian Murdoch". University of Stirling.
