= David Yeandle =

British Germanist (1955–2025)

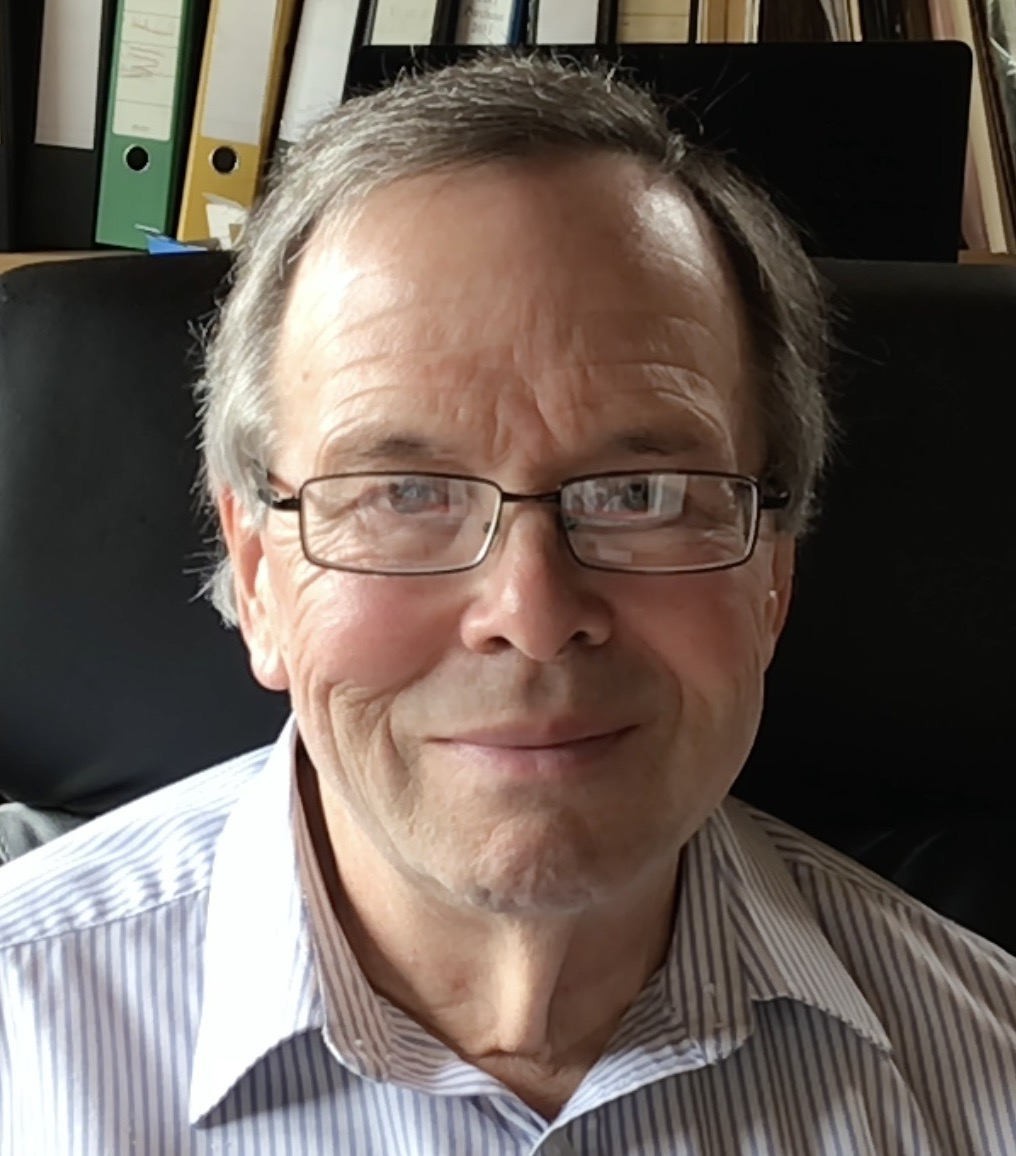
- Yeandle in 2022
- Born: 27 February 1955; Cambridge, England
- Died: 22 September 2025 (aged 70); Hemingford Abbots, Cambridgeshire, England
- Occupations: Academic, author
- Title: Emeritus Professor and Senior Research Fellow
- Awards: Freeman of the City of London

Academic background
- Doctoral advisor: Dennis Howard Green

Academic work
- Discipline: German language and literature
- Sub-discipline: Medieval German Literature; History of German Language
- Institutions: King's College London; Cambridge University

David Nicholas Yeandle (27 February 1955 – 22 September 2025) was a British Germanist and author.

== Life and career ==
Yeandle was born in Cambridge, England on 27 February 1955. He was Emeritus Professor and Senior Research Fellow at King's College London and an Affiliated Lecturer in German at the University of Cambridge. He published widely on German language and literature, including Old High German, Middle High German, and the modern German language. After taking early retirement in 2010, he developed a research interest in ecclesiastical history, particularly of the Anglican Church. Yeandle died in Hemingford Abbots, Cambridgeshire on 22 September 2025, at the age of 70.

== Selected publications ==
- Commentary on the Soltane and Jeschute Episodes in Book III of Wolfram von Eschenbach’s Parzival (116,5–138,8) (Heidelberg: Winter, 1984) [also: David Nicholas Yeandle, "A Detailed, Critical Commentary on the Soltane and Jeschute Episodes in Book III of Wolfram von Eschenbach’s Parzival". (University of Cambridge: PhD Dissertation, 1982)] ISBN 3-533-03-577-8
- "The Ludwigslied: King, Church, and Context’", in: "mit regulu bithuungan": neue Arbeiten zur althochdeutschen Poesie und Sprache, edited by J.L. Flood and D.N. Yeandle (Göppingen: Kümmerle, 1989) ISBN 3-87452-737-9
- Frieden im "Neuen Deutschland". Das Vokabular des "Friedenskampfes": Eine linguistische Analyse und Dokumentation des Friedensvokabulars in der offiziellen Sprache der DDR vornehmlich der ausgehenden 80er Jahre (Heidelberg: Winter, 1991) ISBN 3-533-04-410-6
- A Victorian Curate: A Study of the Life and Career of the Rev. Dr John Hunt (Cambridge: Open Book Publishers, 2021) ISBN 1-80064-154-0
