= Early Germanic Literature and Culture =

2004 book edited by Brian O. Murdoch and Malcolm Read

- Author: Brian O. Murdoch and Malcolm Read
- Language: English
- Subject: Early Germanic culture
- Publisher: Camden House
- Publication date: 2004
- Publication place: United States
- Pages: 344
- ISBN: 1-57113-199-X (hardcover)
- OCLC: 186198190

Early Germanic Literature and Culture is a book edited by Brian O. Murdoch and Malcolm Read. The book was published by Camden House in 2004. It covers anthropological, archaeological and philological aspects of the study on early Germanic culture and literature. The chapters of the book are written by individual specialists in these fields.

== See also ==
- Language and history in the early Germanic world
- The Early Germans

== Sources ==
- Cathey, James E. (2005). "Murdoch, Brian, and Malcolm Read, eds. Early Germanic Literature and Culture". The German Quarterly. 78 (3). Wiley-Blackwell: 380–381.
- Classen, Albrecht [in German] (October 2005). "Brian Murdoch and Malcolm Read, eds. Early Germanic Literature and Culture". German Studies Review. 28 (3). Johns Hopkins University Press: 623–625. JSTOR 30038237.
- Davis, Craig (2006). "Murdoch, Brian and Malcolm Read, eds.. Early Germanic Literature and Culture. Series". The Medieval Review. Indiana University.
- Frakes, Jerold C. (April 2006). "Early Germanic Literature and Culture. Edited by Brian Murdoch and Malcolm Read". Journal of English and Germanic Philology. 105 (2). University of Illinois Press: 347–349. doi:10.2307/27712592. JSTOR 27712592.
- Glauch, Sonja [in German] (2008). "Brian Murdoch, Malcolm Read (Hhh.), Early Germanic Literature and Culture". Beiträge zur Geschichte der deutschen Sprache und Literatur. 129 (1). Max Niemeyer Verlag: 138–143. doi:10.1515/BGSL.2007.138.
- Jeep, John M. (April 2006). "Brian Murdoch and Malcolm Read, eds., Early Germanic Literature and Culture". Speculum. 81 (2). University of Chicago Press: 569–570. doi:10.1017/S0038713400003274.
- Lange, Gudrun (2008). "Early Germanic Literature and Culture, Edited by Brian Murdoch and Malcolm Read". Mediaevistik. 21. Peter Lang: 327–328. JSTOR 42586694.
- Straubhaar, Sandra Ballif (2004). "Brian Murdoch and Malcolm Read (Eds.): Early Germanic Literature and Culture". Colloquia Germanica. 37. Narr Francke Attempto Verlag: 333–334. JSTOR 23981875.
- Volfing, Annette (April 2006). "Early Germanic Literature and Culture. Ed. by Brian Murdoch and Malcolm Read". Modern Language Review. 101 (2). Modern Humanities Research Association: 565–567. doi:10.2307/20466856. JSTOR 20466856.
