= Legend =

Genre of storytelling that involves heroic humans

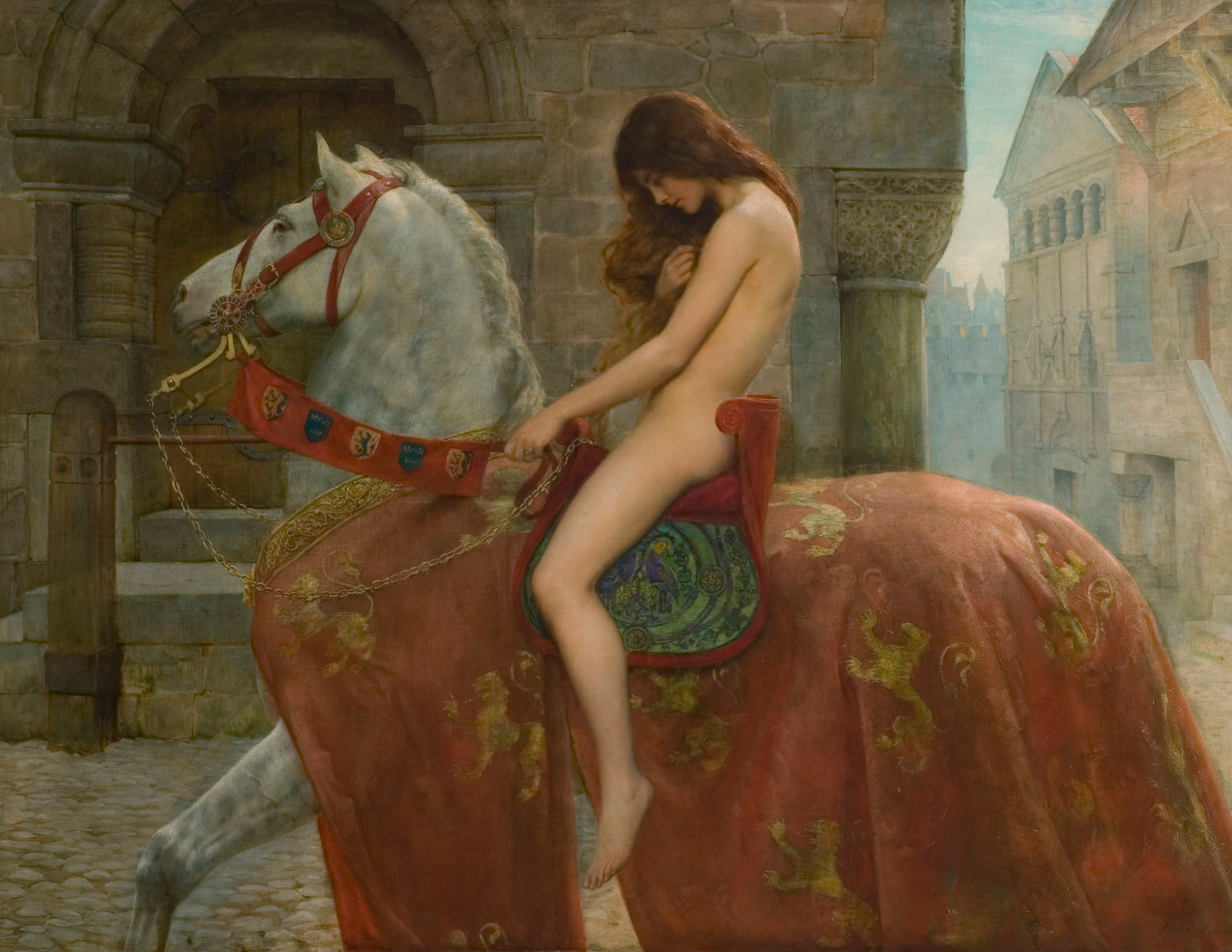
In this 1897 painting of Lady Godiva by John Collier, the authentic historical person is fully submerged in the legend, presented in an anachronistic high medieval setting.

A legend is a genre of folklore that consists of a narrative featuring human actions, believed or perceived to have taken place in human history. Narratives in this genre may demonstrate human values, and possess certain qualities that give the tale verisimilitude. Legend, for its active and passive participants, may include miracles. Legends may be transformed over time to keep them fresh and vital.

Many legends operate within the realm of uncertainty, never being entirely believed by the participants, but also never being resolutely doubted. Legends are sometimes distinguished from myths in that they concern human beings as the main characters and do not necessarily have supernatural origins, and sometimes in that they have some sort of historical basis whereas myths generally do not. The Brothers Grimm defined legend as "folktale historically grounded". A by-product of the "concern with human beings" is the long list of legendary creatures, leaving no "resolute doubt" that legends are "historically grounded."

A modern folklorist's professional definition of legend was proposed by Timothy R. Tangherlini in 1990:

Legend, typically, is a short (mono-) episodic, traditional, highly ecotypified historicized narrative performed in a conversational mode, reflecting on a psychological level a symbolic representation of folk belief and collective experiences and serving as a reaffirmation of commonly held values of the group to whose tradition it belongs.

== Etymology and origin ==
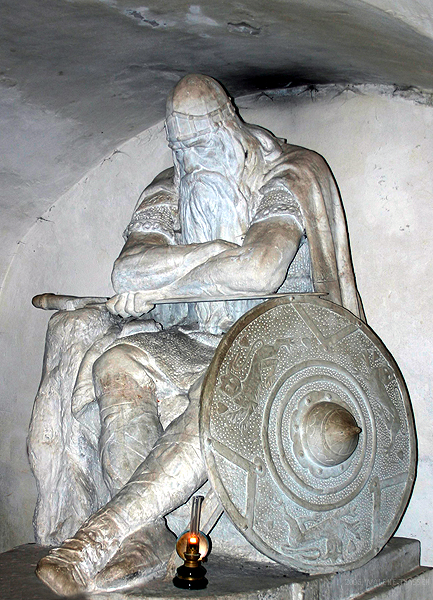
Holger Danske, a legendary character

Legend is a loanword from Old French that entered English usage c. 1340. The Old French noun legende derives from the Medieval Latin legenda. In its early English-language usage, the word indicated a narrative of an event. The word legendary was originally a noun (introduced in the 1510s) meaning a collection or corpus of legends. This word changed to legendry, and legendary became the adjectival form.

By 1613, English-speaking Protestants began to use the word when they wished to imply that an event (especially the story of any saint not acknowledged in John Foxe's Actes and Monuments) was fictitious. Thus, legend gained its modern connotations of "undocumented" and "spurious", which distinguishes it from the meaning of chronicle.

In 1866, Jacob Grimm described the fairy tale as "poetic, legend historic." Early scholars such as Karl Wehrhan Friedrich Ranke and Will Erich Peuckert followed Grimm's example in focussing solely on the literary narrative, an approach that was enriched particularly after the 1960s, by addressing questions of performance and the anthropological and psychological insights provided in considering legends' social context. Questions of categorising legends, in hopes of compiling a content-based series of categories on the line of the Aarne–Thompson folktale index, provoked a search for a broader new synthesis. In an early attempt at defining some basic questions operative in examining folk tales, Friedrich Ranke in 1925 characterised the folk legend as "a popular narrative with an objectively untrue imaginary content", a dismissive position that was subsequently largely abandoned.

Compared to the highly structured folktale, legend is comparatively amorphous, Helmut de Boor noted in 1928. The narrative content of legend is in realistic mode, rather than the wry irony of folktale; Wilhelm Heiske remarked on the similarity of motifs in legend and folktale and concluded that, in spite of its realistic mode, legend is not more historical than folktale.

In Einleitung in der Geschichtswissenschaft (1928), Ernst Bernheim asserted that a legend is simply a longstanding rumour. Gordon Allport credited the staying-power of some rumours to the persistent cultural state-of-mind that they embody and capsulise; thus "Urban legends" are a feature of rumour. When Willian Hugh Jansen suggested that legends that disappear quickly were "short-term legends" and the persistent ones be termed "long-term legends", the distinction between legend and rumour was effectively obliterated, Tangherlini concluded.

== Christian legenda ==
In a narrow Christian sense, legenda ("things to be read [on a certain day, in church]") were hagiographical accounts, often collected in a legendary. Because saints' lives are often included in many miracle stories, legend, in a wider sense, came to refer to any story that is set in a historical context, but that contains supernatural, divine or fantastic elements.

== Oral tradition ==
History preserved orally through many generations often takes on a more narrative-based or mythological form over time, an example being the oral traditions of the African Great Lakes.

== Urban legend ==
Urban legends are a modern genre of folklore that is rooted in local popular culture, usually comprising fictional stories that are often presented as true, with macabre or humorous elements. These legends can be used for entertainment purposes, as well as semi-serious explanations for seemingly-mysterious events, such as disappearances and strange objects.

The term "urban legend," as generally used by folklorists, has appeared in print since at least 1968. Jan Harold Brunvand, professor of English at the University of Utah, introduced the term to the general public in a series of popular books published beginning in 1981. Brunvand used his collection of legends, The Vanishing Hitchhiker: American Urban Legends & Their Meanings (1981) to make two points: first, that legends and folklore do not occur exclusively in so-called primitive or traditional societies, and second, that one could learn much about urban and modern culture by studying such tales.

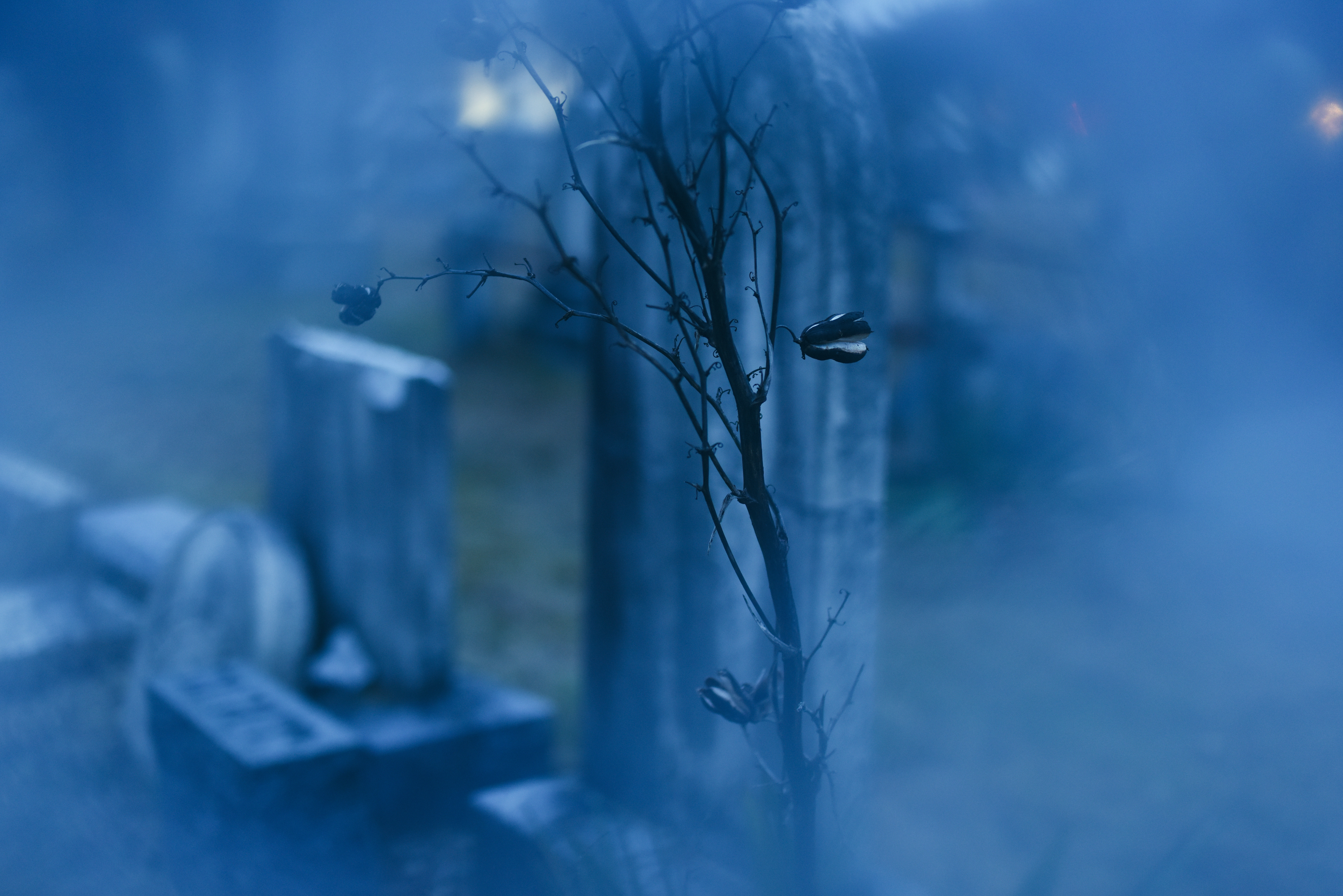
The tale of the White Lady who haunts Union Cemetery is a variant of the Vanishing hitchhiker legend.

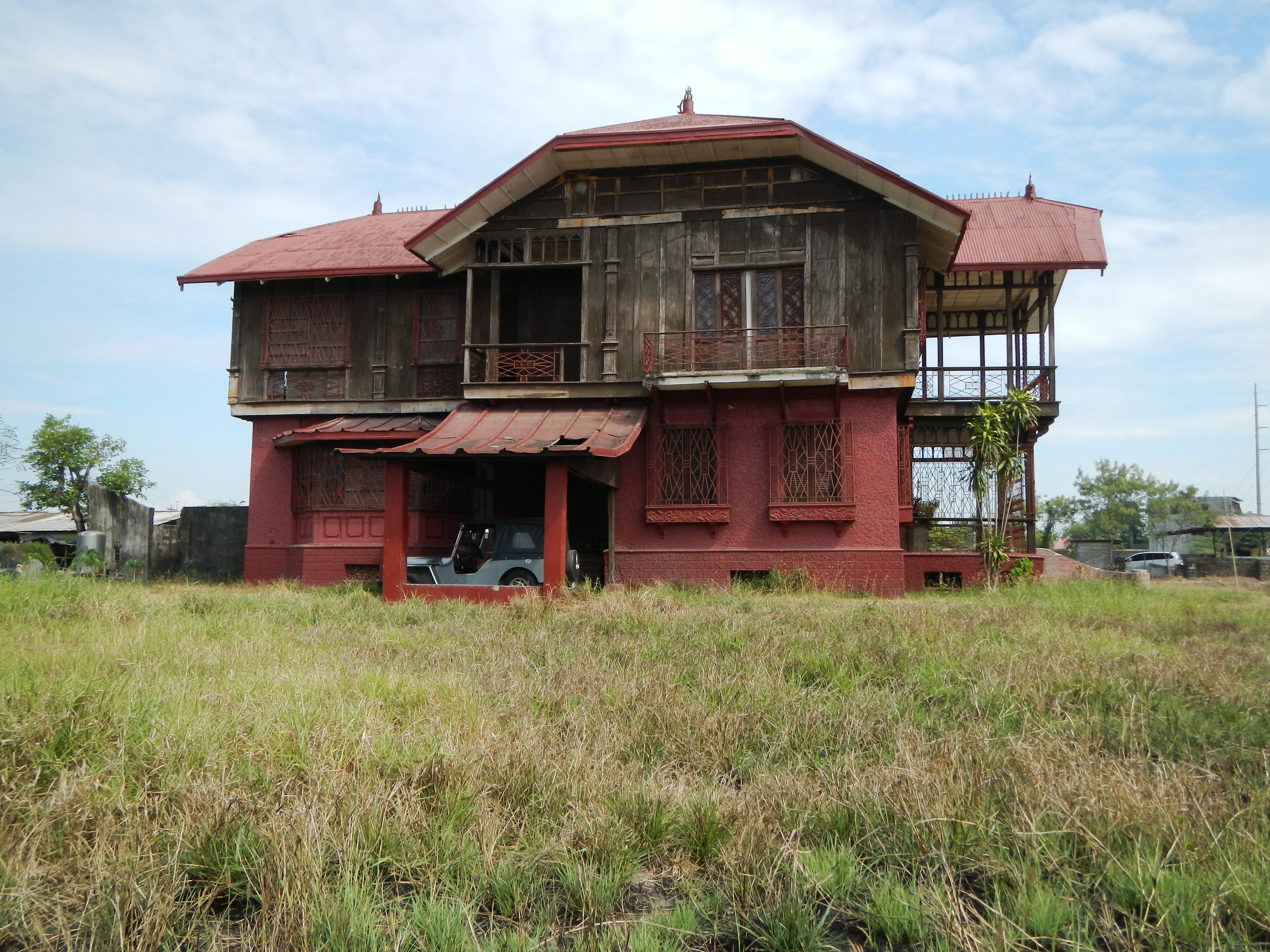
Bahay na Pula in the Philippines is believed to be haunted by all those who were murdered and raped by the Japanese army within the property during World War II.

== Related concepts ==
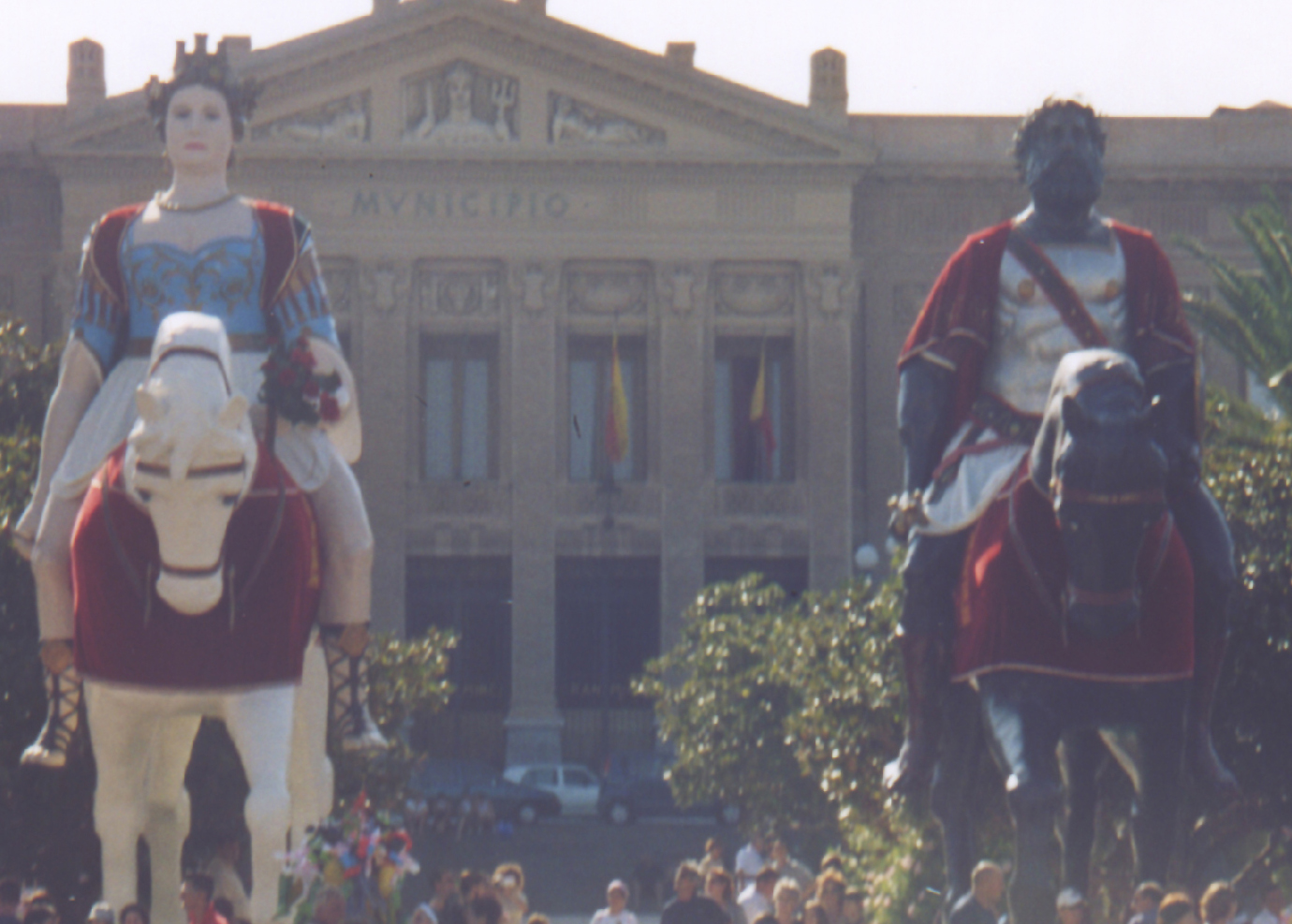
Giants Mata and Grifone, celebrated in the streets of Messina, Italy, the second week of August, according to a legend are founders of the Sicilian city.

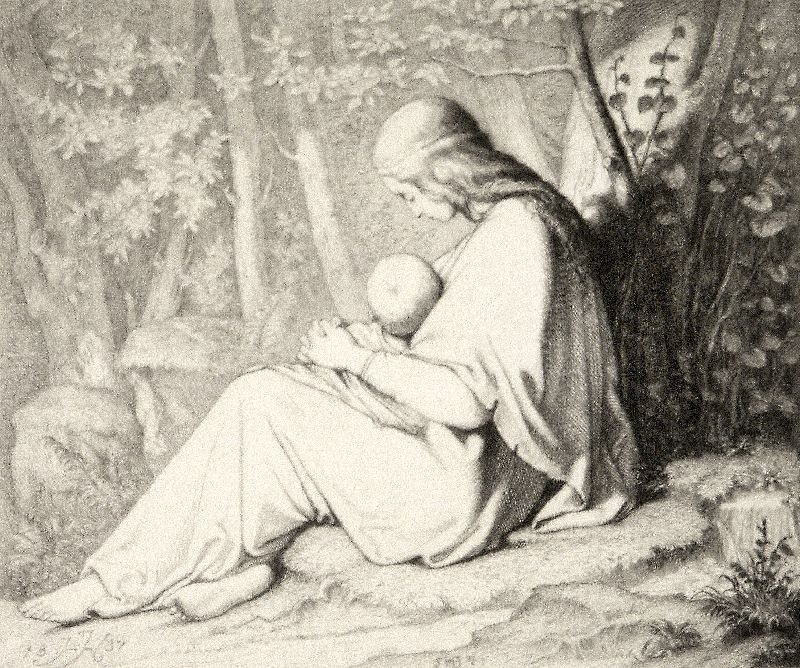
The mediaeval legend of Genevieve of Brabant connected her to Treves.

Hippolyte Delehaye distinguished legend from myth: "The legend, on the other hand, has, of necessity, some historical or topographical connection. It refers imaginary events to some real personage, or it localizes romantic stories in some definite spot."

From the moment a legend is retold as fiction, its authentic legendary qualities begin to fade and recede: in The Legend of Sleepy Hollow, Washington Irving transformed a local Hudson River Valley legend into a literary anecdote with "Gothic" overtones, which actually tended to diminish its character as genuine legend.

Stories that exceed the boundaries of "realism" are called "fables". For example, the talking animal formula of Aesop identifies his brief stories as fables and not legends. The parable of the Prodigal Son would be a legend if it were told as having actually happened to a specific son of a historical father. If it included a donkey that gave sage advice to the Prodigal Son it would be a fable.

Legend may be transmitted orally, passed on person-to-person, or, in the original sense, through written text. Jacobus de Voragine's Legenda Aurea or "The Golden Legend" comprises a series of vitae or instructive biographical narratives, tied to the liturgical calendar of the Roman Catholic Church. They are presented as lives of the saints, but the profusion of miraculous happenings and above all their uncritical context are characteristics of hagiography. The Legenda was intended to inspire extemporized homilies and sermons appropriate to the saint of the day.

== See also ==
- Legendary saga
- Legendary creature
- Lists of legendary creatures
- The Matter of Britain, Arthurian legend
- Matter of France
- Narrative history
- Non-fiction novel
