= Joan Brown (potter) =

British potter

Joan Brown (née Bruford; 1926 – 6 March 2016) was a British potter. She set up her pottery workshop in 1967 in Richmond, and exhibited widely in Britain. She was born in Aberdeen and was the daughter of Gerda and Walter Bruford. She was married to the landscape architect Michael Brown and worked on several projects for architects, including creating a water sculpture for her husband's sunken roof garden design for the Royal Northern College of Music in Manchester. She was an associate member of the Craft Potters Association and exhibited several times in the Royal Scottish Academy Christmas Show.

She studied at Edinburgh College of Art (1945–49) and her tutors included John Maxwell and William Gillies. She studied on a joint course between Edinburgh College of Art and the University of Edinburgh. As well as studying drawing and painting she studied the theory and history of art and gained an MA Hons from the University of Edinburgh. She later studied textile design and etching at the Central School of Arts and Crafts (now Central Saint Martins College). This was part of a combined course (1945–49) that also involved studying the history and theory of art at the University of Edinburgh, where she gained a master's degree, followed by postgraduate courses in textile design and etching, the latter at the Central School of Arts and Crafts in London (now Central Saint Martins College of Arts and Design).
