= Walter Horace Bruford =

British scholar

Walter Horace Bruford, FBA (14 July 1894 – 28 June 1988) was a British scholar of German literature.

Walter Horace Bruford was born in Manchester in 1894. He was educated at Manchester Grammar School and then at St. John's College, Cambridge, and the University of Zurich. During World War I he served with the Royal Navy cryptographic intelligence division in Room 40 at the Admiralty. After the war he conducted research in Zurich, became a lecturer in German at Aberdeen University in 1920, and then a reader at Aberdeen in 1923. Bruford was then appointed professor of German at the University of Edinburgh in 1929. He was seconded to the Foreign Office during World War II, 1939–1943, to work at Bletchley Park. From 1951 he was Schröder Professor of German at the University of Cambridge until 1961.

His elder daughter was the British potter Joan Brown, and his son was the folklorist Dr Alan Bruford.

Bruford lived at Abbey St. Bathans, Duns, Berwickshire. He died in 1988.

== Works ==
- Germany in the eighteenth century: the social background of the literary revival (1935)
- Chekhov and His Russia, a Sociological Study (1947)
- Theatre, drama, and audience in Goethe's Germany (1950)
- Literary Interpretation in Germany (1952)
- Anton Chekhov (1957)
- Fürstin Gallitzin und Goethe. Das Selbstvervollkommnungsideal und seine Grenzen (1957)
- Culture and society in classical Weimar, 1775-1806 (1962)
- First Steps In German Fifty Years Ago (1965)
- The German Tradition of Self-cultivation: Bildung from Humboldt to Thomas Mann (1975)
- Some German Memories 1911-1961 (1979)
