= Friedrich Ranke =

German philologist

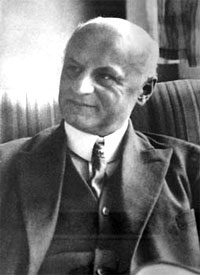
- Born: 21 September 1882; Lübeck, Germany
- Died: 11 October 1959 (aged 77); Basel, Switzerland

Academic background
- Education: Friedrich Wilhelm University of Berlin
- Influences: Friedrich von der Leyen

Academic work
- Discipline: Germanic studies
- Sub-discipline: German philology; Old Norse studies
- Institutions: University of Göttingen; University of Königsberg; University of Breslau; University of Basel
- Notable students: Dennis Howard Green
- Main interests: German folklore; Medieval German literature; Old Norse literature

Friedrich Ranke (21 September 1882 – 11 October 1950) was a German medievalist philologist and folklorist. His Old Norse textbook Altnordisches Elementarbuch remains a standard, and all literature concerning Gottfried von Strassburgs Tristan und Isold uses Ranke's line numbering for references to the text.

== Biography ==
Born in Lübeck as one of three sons of the theologian Leopold Friedrich Ranke and his wife Julie (von Bever) (1850–1924), he was a brother of the Egyptologists Hermann und Otto Ranke (1880–1917). Graduating from the Katharineum at Lübeck, he studied German, English and Nordic philology at the University of Göttingen from 1902 to 1903, at the Ludwig-Maximilians-Universität München from 1903 to 1905, and at the Friedrich Wilhelm University of Berlin from 1905 to 1907. At the Ludwig-Maximilians-Universität München, he studied with the pioneering folklorist Friedrich von der Leyen. At the Friedrich Wilhelm University of Berlin, he made his publishing debut with Sprache und Stil im Wälschen Gast des Thomasin von Circlaria ("Language and style in 'The Romansh Guest' by Thomasin von Zirclaere"). His term at the University of Strasbourg produced his work of German folktales, Der Erloser in der Wiege; ein Beitrag zur Deutschen Volkssagenforschung ("The Redeemer in the cradle: a contribution towards German folktale research", 1911).

From 1912, Ranke was occupied as a tutor in Göttingen, After returning from his service at the front in World War I he was appointed assistant professor there in German philology, and then in 1921 full professor in German philology at the University of Königsberg; in 1930 he occupied the same position at the University of Breslau, whence, silenced by the Nazis in 1937, he removed to the University of Basel, Switzerland, as professor of German philology, where he remained until his death.

== Selected publications ==
- Die deutschen Volkssagen. Munich 1910 (Deutsches Sagenbuch; 4).
- Der Erlöser in der Wiege: ein Beitrag zur deutschen Volkssagenforschung. Munich 1911.
- Tristan und Isold. Munich 1925 (Bücher des Mittelalters; 3), Berlin 1930, etc.; Ranke's corrected second edition (1949) is still the standard modern critical edition of Gottfried von Strassburg's text.
- Die Allegorie der Minnegrotte in Gottfrieds Tristan. Berlin 1925 (Königsberger Gelehrte Gesellschaft/Geisteswissenschaftliche Klasse: Schriften der Königsberger Gelehrten Gesellschaft, Geisteswissenschaftliche Klasse; 2,2).

Volkssagenforschung. Vorträge u. Aufsätze. Breslau 1935 (Deutschkundliche Arbeiten/A; 4).

- Altnordisches Elementarbuch. Schrifttum, Sprache, Texte mit Übersetzung und Wörterbuch. Berlin 1937
- Gott, Welt und Humanität in der deutschen Dichtung des Mittelalters. Basel 1952.

His articles were assembled and reprinted as Kleinere Schriften. Bern/Munich 1971 (in series Bibliotheca Germanica 12).

- Die Überlieferung von Gottfrieds Tristan. Darmstadt 1974.

There are detailed accounts of Ranke, by Hartmut Freytag in Alken Bruns, ed.Lübecker Lebensläufe, (Neumünster: Karl Wachholtz Verlag) 1993, ISBN 3-529-02729-4, S. 317-320; and by Rolf-Wilhelm Brednich in Enzyklopädie des Märchens vol 11 (2004), pp203–207.

== See also ==
- Eugen Mogk
- Hugo Gering
- Rudolf Much
