= Nicholas Boyle =

British academic

Nicholas Boyle FBA
- Born: 18 June 1946 (age 80); London, England
- Occupation: Academic

Nicholas Boyle FBA (born 18 June 1946) is an English literary critic. He is the emeritus Schröder Professor of German at the University of Cambridge and a fellow of Magdalene College, Cambridge. He has written widely on German literature, intellectual history and religion and is known particularly for his award-winning extensive biography of Goethe (of which three of a projected four volumes have been published). Boyle became a fellow of the British Academy in 2000.

== Life and work ==
Boyle was educated at King's School, Worcester, and Magdalene College, Cambridge, where he was awarded BA and PhD degrees. He was a research fellow at Magdalene from 1968 to 1972, before becoming respectively an assistant lecturer, lecturer, and reader in German at the University of Cambridge between 1972 and 2000. He was head of the German department at Cambridge between 1996 and 2001.

Boyle's biography of Goethe currently runs to three volumes and he is writing the fourth. George Steiner has called him a 'critic of vivacious perspicacity' and compares the scope of his work to "Lord Bullock's double portraits of Hitler and Stalin, Richard Holmes's Coleridge, David Cairns's Berlioz, Michael Holroyd's Shaw, Richardson's Picasso", whilst The New York Times Book Review describes his biography as a 'remarkable achievement', adding that 'there is nothing comparable to this study in any language'. The biography has been translated into German by Holger Fliessbach. The Goethe Institut awarded Boyle their Goethe Medal in 2000. The second volume was shortlisted for the British Academy Book Prize in 2001.

He lives in Cambridge with his wife and four children.

== Financial Times letter ==
In 2017, one of Boyle's letters to the Financial Times went viral. In the letter, Boyle responded to a Big Read article ("Braced for the fall") published on 5 July 2017. In the article, it was stated that the pro-Brexit wing of the Conservative Party are to be known as 'fuckers', while their opponents are to be known as 'wankers'. Boyle opined that "this rhetoric inverts the truth", as "it is the Europhobes who shut themselves away in self-gratifying fantasies, while the Remainers know that real life is possible only through interaction with others".

Boyle's letter was described as outstanding and the "letter of the decade" by editor Lionel Barber, and was shared across multiple online platforms.

== Bibliography ==
- Nicholas Boyle, Martin Swales and Joseph Peter Stern (eds.), Realism in European literature: essays in honour of JP Stern (Cambridge: Cambridge University Press, 1986)
- Nicholas Boyle, Goethe: Faust Part One (Cambridge: Cambridge University Press, 1986)
- Nicholas Boyle, Goethe: The Poet and the Age: Volume I: The Poetry of Desire (1749–1790) (Oxford: Oxford University Press, 1991)
- Introduction to Selected works: including The Sorrows of Young Werther, Elective Affinities, Italian Journey, Faust New York: A.A. Knopf, 2000, 1999. Everyman's Library #246
- Nicholas Boyle, Who Are We Now?: Christian Humanism and the Global Market from Hegel to Heaney (Continuum, 2000)
- Nicholas Boyle, Goethe: The Poet and the Age Volume II: Revolution and Renunciation, 1790–1803 (Oxford, Clarendon Press, 2000)
- Nicholas Boyle and John Guthrie (eds.) Goethe and the English-speaking World (Boydell and Brewer, 2002)
- Nicholas Boyle, Sacred and Secular Scriptures: A Catholic Approach to Literature (University of Notre Dame Press, 2004)
- Nicholas Boyle, German Literature: A Very Short Introduction (Oxford: Oxford University Press, 2008)
- Nicholas Boyle, 2014 – How to Survive the Next World Crisis (Continuum Books, 2010)
- Nicholas Boyle, Goethe: The Poet and the Age Volume III: In the Shadow of Napoleon (1803–1809) (Oxford, Oxford University Press, 2026)
