= Eliza Marian Butler =

English scholar of German; linguist and intellectual historian (1885–1959)

Butler in c1956-59

Eliza Marian Butler (29 December 1885 – 13 November 1959), was an English linguist, academic, and scholar of German who successively held two prestigious endowed professorships: the Henry Simon Chair in German (1936–1944) at University of Manchester; and the Schröder Professor of German at the University of Cambridge (from 1945). She was the first woman ever appointed to either of these chairs. Controversial when first published, and banned in Germany, her 1935 book The Tyranny of Greece over Germany, became a classic of German cultural analysis in the English-speaking world after the Second World War. In addition to academic works, published as E. M. Butler and Elizabeth M. Butler, she published two novels and a memoir.

== Early life ==
Eliza Butler, known as "Elsie", was born in Bardsea, Lancashire, to a family of Anglo-Irish ancestry. She was educated by a Norwegian governess (from whom she learned German) and subsequently in Hannover from age 11, Paris from age 15, the school of domestic science at Reifenstein Abbey from age 18, and Newnham College, Cambridge from 21. As a teenager, she watched Kaiser Wilhelm II inspect his troops. In the First World War she worked as an interpreter and nurse in Scottish units on the Russian and Macedonian fronts (she had learned Russian from Jane Harrison) and treated the victims of the German assault.

== Career ==
After working in hospitals, she taught at Cambridge and in 1936 became a professor at the University of Manchester. Her works include a trilogy on ritual magic and the occult, especially in the Faust legend (1948–1952).

In her 1935 work, The Tyranny of Greece over Germany, she wrote that Germany has had "too much exposure to Ancient Greek literature and art. The result was that the German mind had succumbed to 'the tyranny of an ideal'. The German worship of Ancient Greece had emboldened the Nazis to remake Europe in their image." It was controversial in Britain and its translation was banned in Germany. Butler also wrote two novels. Her autobiography, Paper Boats, was published by William Collins, Sons in the year of her death.

Butler was awarded an honorary doctorate (D.Litt.) from London University in 1957 and one from Oxford University in 1958.

== Legacy ==
In her research on German orientalism, the scholar Suzanne L. Marchand built upon Butler's German cultural critique; Marchand, too, emphasised the political overtones of Orientalistik ('Oriental studies') and Germany's philhellenism. Marchand is critical of Edward Said's view, expressed in his Orientalism, that German orientalism was not of the same pernicious quality as the orientalism of the colonial powers, France and Britain. Said's belief was that Germany historically had a mostly "classical" interest in the Orient. In contrast, Marchand agrees with Butler in concluding that the use of classical Greece by 18th- to the early-20th-century German nationalism was a factor in the rise of fascist ideology.

== Personal life ==
Butler had a long-term committed relationship with fellow-scholar Isaline Blew Horner. From 1926 until Butler's death, the two lived and travelled together.

Butler died in London on 13 November 1959.

== Selected works ==
- The Saint-Simonian Religion (Cambridge: Cambridge University Press, 1926)
- The Tempestuous Prince (Cambridge: Cambridge University Press, 1929)
- Sheridan: A Ghost Story (London: Constable, 1931)
- The Tyranny of Greece Over Germany: A Study of the Influence Exercised by Greek Art and Poetry Over the Great German Writers of the Eighteenth, Nineteenth and Twentieth Centuries (Cambridge University Press, 1935; reprinted 1958 Boston: Beacon; and 2012 Cambridge, MA: Cambridge University Press, ISBN 1107697646).
- Rainer Maria Rilke (Cambridge: Cambridge University Press, 1941; reprinted 1946 Cambridge: Cambridge University Press)
- The Myth of the Magus (Cambridge: Cambridge University Press, 1947)
- Ritual Magic (University Park: The Pennsylvania State University Press, 1949; reimpression 1998)
- Daylight in a Dream (London: The Hogarth Press, 1951)
- Silver Wings (London: The Hogarth Press, 1952)
- The Fortunes of Faust (Cambridge University Press, 1952)
- Heinrich Heine: a biography (Hogarth Press, 1956)
- Paper Boats (London: Collins, 1959), a volume of reminiscences
