= Sarah Colvin =

Sarah Jean Colvin (born 13 July 1967) is a British scholar of German, literary theory, and gender studies. Since 2014, she has been Schröder Professor of German at the University of Cambridge. She previously held the Eudo C. Mason Chair of German at the University of Edinburgh (2004–2010), and was Professor in Study of Contemporary Germany at the University of Birmingham (2010–2012), then Professor of German at the University of Warwick (2013–2014).

== Selected works ==
- Colvin, Sarah (1999). The Rhetorical Feminine: Gender and Orient on the German Stage, 1647-1742. Oxford: Clarendon Press. ISBN 978-0198186366.
- Colvin, Sarah (2009). Ulrike Meinhof and West German Terrorism: Language, Violence, and Identity. Camden House. ISBN 978-1571134158.
- Colvin, Sarah, ed. (2014). Routledge Handbook of German Politics & Culture. London: Routledge. ISBN 978-0415686860.
