= Schröder Professor of German =

German linguistic senior professorship at the University of Cambridge

The Schröder Professorship of German is the senior professorship in the study of the German language at the University of Cambridge, and was founded in 1909 by a donation of £20,000 from Sir John Henry Freiherr von Schröder, Bt. of J. H. Schröder & Co, a City of London banking firm.

== Schröder Professors ==
- Karl Hermann Breul (1910)
- Robert Allan Williams (1932)
- Eliza Marian Butler (1944)
- Walter Horace Bruford (1951)
- Leonard Wilson Forster (1961)
- Dennis Howard Green (1979)
- Roger Cole Paulin (1989)
- Nicholas Boyle (2006)
- Sarah Colvin (2014)
