= Roger Paulin =

- Born: New Zealand
- Occupation: Academic

Roger Cole Paulin (born 1937) is a scholar of German literature and culture. He was the Schröder Professor of German at the University of Cambridge from 1989 until his retirement in 2005.

== Education ==
Paulin was born in New Zealand, where he took his first degree in German and French, before researching for and being awarded a Dr. phil. at the University of Heidelberg in 1965.

== Career ==
Paulin taught at the universities of Birmingham and Bristol before moving to Cambridge in 1974 to take up a university lectureship and fellowship of Trinity College, as well as being admitted to the Cambridge MA. From 1987 to 1989 he was the Henry Simon Professor of German in the University of Manchester. In 1989 he returned to Cambridge to take up the Schröder Chair, serving from 1989 to 1996 as head of the Department of German. Following his retirement, he has remained a Fellow of Trinity College.

His wide-ranging research interests span the period 1500–1900, with a specific focus on the work of the Goethezeit, German Romanticism, and nineteenth-century German literature and culture. Alongside more than 85 articles and 11 edited and co-edited volumes on German literary figures ranging from Johann Wolfgang Goethe to Rainer Maria Rilke, he has published (among other single-authored books) seminal monographs on Ludwig Tieck (1985; German translation 1987) and August Wilhelm Schlegel (2016, German translation 2017); a highly regarded study of the development of the novella in nineteenth-century Germany (1985); and a pathbreaking account of the reception of William Shakespeare in Germany from 1682 to 1914 (2003).

Paulin's work is notable for the very significant contribution that it has made to eighteenth- and nineteenth-century German and comparative literary studies, both inside and outside of Germany. In recognition of his scholarly achievements, he was awarded a Litt.D. at Cambridge in 1987, followed by a Humboldt Prize in 2002, and the Order of Merit of the Federal Republic of Germany (Bundesverdienstkreuz) in 2011.

== Major publications & Festschrift ==
- Gryphius' "Cardenio and Celinde" und Arnims "Halle und Jerusalem" (Tübingen: Max Niemeyer, 1968).
- Ed., The Spectrum of Goethe's Poetry, German Life & Letters Special Number, 1982–83.
- The Brief Compass: The Nineteenth-Century German Novelle (Oxford: Oxford University Press, 1985).
- Ludwig Tieck: A Literary Biography (Oxford: Oxford University Press, 1985).
- Ludwig Tieck (Stuttgart: J. B. Metzler, 1987).
- Ludwig Tieck: Eine literarische Biographie (München: C. H. Beck, 1988).
- Theodor Storm (München: C. H. Beck, 1992).
- Ed. with Peter Hutchinson and Judith Purver, German Romantics in Context: Selected Essays, 1971-86, by Elizabeth Stopp (London: Bristol Classical Press, 1992).
- Ed. with Peter Hutchinson, Rilke's Duino Elegies (London: Duckworth & Ariadne Press, 1996).
- Ed., Johann Wolfgang Goethe: Die Leiden des jungen Werthers (London: Bristol Classical Press, 1998).
- Der Fall Wilhelm Jerusalem: Zum Selbstmordproblem zwischen Aufklärung und Empfindsamkeit (Göttingen: Wallstein, 1999).
- Ed. with J. Barkhoff and G. Carr, Das schwierige 19. Jahrhundert (Tübingen: Max Niemeyer, 2000).
- The Critical Reception of Shakespeare in Germany (Hildesheim: Georg Olms, 2003).
- Festschrift für Roger Paulin: Zwischen Aufklärung und Romantik. Neue Perspektiven der Forschung, ed. Konrad Feilchenfeldt, Ursula Hudson, York-Gotthart Mix and Nicholas Saul (Würzburg: Königshausen & Neumann 2006).
- Ed., Shakespeare im 18. Jahrhundert (Göttingen: Wallstein, 2007).
- Ed., Voltaire, Goethe, Schlegel, Coleridge: Great Shakespeareans, Vol. III (New York: Bloomsbury Academic, 2010).
- Ed., with Helmut Pfotenhauer, Die Halbschlafbilder in der Literatur, den Künsten und den Wissenschaften (Würzburg: Königshausen & Neumann, 2011).
- The Life of August Wilhelm Schlegel, Cosmopolitan of Art and Poetry (Cambridge: Open Book Publishers, 2016).
- August Wilhelm Schlegel: Biografie (Paderborn: Schöningh 2017).
- From Goethe to Gundolf: Essays on German Literature and Culture (Cambridge: Open Book Publishers, 2021).
