= The Early Germans (Todd book) =

1992 book by Malcolm Todd

- Author: Malcolm Todd
- Language: English
- Series: The Peoples of Europe
- Subject: Early Germanic peoples
- Publisher: Blackwell
- Publication date: 1992
- Publication place: United Kingdom
- Pages: 285
- ISBN: 0-631-16397-2 (hardback)
- OCLC: 446545927

The Early Germans is a book by archaeologist Malcolm Todd on the history and culture of the early Germanic peoples. It was published by Blackwell in 1992. The books was published as part of The Peoples of Europe series. A second revised edition was published in 2004. Translations have been published in numerous languages, including Italian, Czech, German and Russian.

== See also ==
- Altgermanische Religionsgeschichte
- Early Germanic Literature and Culture
- Germanische Altertumskunde Online
- Language and history in the early Germanic world

== Sources ==
- Burns, Thomas S. (1994). "Malcolm Todd, The Early Germans". Speculum. 69 (3). University of Chicago Press: 903–905. doi:10.2307/3040955. JSTOR 3040955.
- Härke, Heinrich (1994). "The Early Germans. By Malcolm Todd". Britannia. 25. Cambridge University Press: 343–344. doi:10.2307/527028. JSTOR 527028. S2CID 191008709.
- Heather, Peter (July 1995). "Shorter Notices". The English Historical Review. CX (437). Oxford University Press. doi:10.1093/ehr/CX.437.679-a.
- Freed, John B. (1993). "The Early Germans. By Malcolm Todd". The Historian. 55 (4). Taylor & Francis: 767–?.
- Pitts, L. F. (1993). "M. T, The Early Germans". Journal of Roman Studies. 83. Cambridge University Press: 240–241. doi:10.2307/301027. JSTOR 301027. S2CID 163314254.
- Welch, Martin (1992). "The Early Germans. By Malcolm Todd". The Antiquaries Journal. 72. Society of Antiquaries of London: 204. doi:10.1017/S0003581500071407. S2CID 162030329.
- Wölke, Hansjörg (2001). "Todd, Malcolm: Die Germanen". Forum Classicum. 2. doi:10.11588/fc.2001.2.37594.
