= Georg Baesecke =

German philologist (1876–1951)

- Born: 13 January 1876; Braunschweig, Germany
- Died: 1 May 1951 (aged 75); Halle, Germany
- Awards: Brothers Grimm Prize of the University of Marburg (1950)

Academic background
- Education: University of Göttingen
- Doctoral advisor: Gustav Roethe

Academic work
- Discipline: Philology
- Sub-discipline: German philology
- Institutions: University of Halle

Georg Paul Baesecke (13 January 1876 – 1 May 1951) was a German philologist who specialized in Germanic studies, particularly the study of Old High German literature. He was Professor and Chair of German Philology at the University of Halle.

== Biography ==
George Baesecke was born in Braunschweig, Germany on 13 January 1876. After graduating from the Martino-Katharineum gymnasium in Braunschweig, Baesecke studies classical philology, German philology and philosophy at the universities of Göttingen, Berlin and Heidelberg. He received his PhD in Göttingen in 1899 under the supervision of Gustav Roethe. He received his habilitation at Berlin in 1905.

Baesecke was appointed associate professor at the University of Berlin in 1911. Baesecke taught at the University of Königsberg since 1913, and was appointed Professor and Chair of German Philology at the University of Halle in 1921. Baesecke specialized in the study of Old High German literature. From 1933, he was a member of the NSDAP. He became a member of the Göttingen Academy of Sciences and Humanities in 1938, and ultimately retired in 1948. He received the Brothers Grimm Prize of the University of Marburg in 1950.

== Selected works ==
- Die Sprache der opitzischen Gedichtsammlungen von 1624 und 1625, 1899
- Der Münchener Oswald Text und Abhandlung, 1907
- Reinhart Fuchs, 1926
- Der deutsche Abrogans und die Herkunft des deutschen Schrifttums, 1930
- Der Vocabularius Sti.Galli in der angelsächsischen Mission, 1933
- Das Hildebrandlied, 1945
- Vor- und Frühgeschichte des deutschen Schrifttums, 1950–1953
- Kleinere Schriften zur althochdeutschen Sprache und Literatur, 1966

== See also ==
- Otto Höfler

== Sources ==
- Theodor Bögel: Baesecke, Georg. In: Neue Deutsche Biographie (NDB). Volume 1, Duncker & Humblot, Berlin 1953, ISBN 3-428-00182-6, p. 529
- Wolfgang Milde: Baesecke, Georg. In: Horst-Rüdiger Jarck, Günter Scheel (Hrsg.): Braunschweigisches Biographisches Lexikon – 19. und 20. Jahrhundert. Hahnsche Buchhandlung, Hannover 1996, ISBN 3-7752-5838-8, pp. 35–36.
- "Georg Baesecke". Martin Luther University of Halle-Wittenberg (in German).
