= Leonard Wilson Forster =

British professor of German (1913–1997)

Leonard Wilson Forster FBA
- Born: Leonard Wilson Foster; 30 March 1913; London, England
- Died: 18 April 1997 (aged 84); Cambridge, England
- Occupations: Linguist and academic
- Title: Schröder Professor of German
- Spouse: Jeanne Billeter (m. 1939)
- Children: 3, including Thomas
- Family: Leonard Williams (father)

Academic background
- Education: Marlborough College
- Alma mater: Trinity Hall, Cambridge (MA); University of Basel (PhD)

Academic work
- Institutions: Leipzig University; University of Königsberg; University of Basel; Selwyn College, Cambridge; University College London

Leonard Wilson Forster FBA (30 March 1913 – 18 April 1997) was an English linguist and academic. He was successively Professor of German at University College London, and Schröder Professor of German at the University of Cambridge.

== Life and work ==
Born in London, Forster was the godchild (and son) of Leonard Llewelyn Bulkeley Williams. Forster studied at Marlborough College, Trinity Hall, Cambridge, where he read Modern Languages (a contemporary of Donald MacLean) and from where he obtained his BA in 1934 and MA in 1938, and the University of Basel, where he was awarded a PhD in 1938. During his studies, he served as English lector at the University of Leipzig in 1934, at the University of Königsberg from 1935 to 1936, and the University of Basel from 1936 to 1938.

During World War II he worked as an intelligence assessor/translator at Bletchley Park, with the rank of Lieutenant commander of the Royal Naval Reserve.

== Academia ==
Forster was a Fellow of Selwyn College, Cambridge in 1937/1938–1950 and 1961–1997, a University Lecturer in German at Cambridge University in 1947–1950, and Professor of German at University College London in 1950–1961. In 1961 he became the Schröder Professor of German at Cambridge University, where he worked until 1979. He was also the President of the International Association for German Studies (Internationale Vereinigung für Germanistik, IVG) from 1970 to 1975. In 1976, he became a Fellow of the British Academy. He was for many years editor of German Life and Letters, whose most famous subscriber is perhaps John le Carré's character George Smiley.

In 1979 he received an Honorary Doctorate from the University of Bath.

== Family ==
He married Jeanne Marie Louise Billeter of Basel in 1939 and they had one son, Thomas, and two daughters. He died in Cambridge in 1997.

== Bibliography ==
- German Poetry, 1944-1948 (Cambridge: Bowes & Bowes, 1949)
- German Tales of Our Time (London: George G. Harrap and Co., 1953)
- The Penguin Book of German Verse (Harmondsworth: Penguin Books, 1957)
- Janus Gruter's English Years: Studies in the Continuity of Dutch Literature in Exile in Elizabethan England (Leiden: Leiden University Press, 1967)
- The Icy Fire: Five Studies in European Petrarchism (Cambridge: Cambridge University Press, 1969)
- The Poet's Tongues: Multilingualism in Literature (Cambridge: Cambridge University Press, 1970)
