= Camden House Publishing =

American publisher

Camden House, Inc. was founded in 1979 by professors James Hardin and Gunther Holst with the purpose of publishing scholarly books in the field of German literature, Austrian Literature, and German language culture. Camden House books were published in Columbia, South Carolina, until 1998. When the company became an imprint in that year, place of publication moved to Rochester, New York.

== Early publication history ==
The series Studies in German Literature, Language, and Culture was established in that same year and continues to the present; over 350 books in this series have appeared as of 2011 The Camden House areas of interest expanded over the following years under the direction of James Hardin, emeritus professor at the University of South Carolina. German language literature in Austria and Switzerland were added to the purview of Camden House early in its history.

The new series Literary Criticism in Perspective was established in the following decade, and in time broadened to include American and British literature. The aim of this more specialized series was, and is, to elucidate the role of literary criticism over the years, to show how it is subject to varying vogues and philosophical or critical viewpoints, and how criticism itself is a mirror of changing taste and critical bias.

== Publications since the late 1980s ==
In the late 1980s, Camden House increasingly sought out highly qualified scholars to write or edit commissioned works, especially in its Companion series. It was fortunate in locating and working with prominent Germanists who brought out companions to the works of such canonical writers as Hartmann von Aue, Friedrich Schiller, Heinrich von Kleist, Heinrich Heine, Thomas Mann, Rainer Maria Rilke, Franz Kafka, and many others over the next two decades. In addition, companions to major works were commissioned and published, including books focused on Goethe's Faust (I and II), the Nibelungenlied, Gottfried von Strassburg's Tristan, and Mann's Magic Mountain. Distinct periods in the history of German literature were treated in companions to German Realism and German Expressionism. Additionally, Camden House established in its first decade of operation a series developed by James Hardin titled Literary Criticism in Perspective which not only provides the reception history of a given German or Austrian literary work, but records the changing nature of literary criticism itself over the years.

Another important aspect of the German program included translations of such key works as Hans Jakob Christoffel von Grimmelshausen's Simplicius Simplicissimus, the first great German novel; Johann Beer's early comic novel Teutsche Winternaechte (German Winter Nights); and Goethe's Wilhelm Meisters theatralische Sendung (Wilhelm Meister's Theatrical Calling), the neglected forerunner to the prototype of Wilhelm Meister's Apprenticeship.

Publication of individually authored monographs on numerous prominent German writer have appeared in the Camden House list, as well as numerous works on German film, theater, song, satire, holocaust literature, literature of the German Democratic Republic, and Austrian literature.

The ten-volume Camden House History of German Literature, which appeared over a period of six years with completion in 2007, treats German literature in extended essays beginning with the earliest Germanic literature, including Gothic, and discusses in detail not only the literary highpoints of German literature—the High Middle Ages, the Age of Goethe, early twentieth-century works—but also generally neglected periods such as the Early Modern period. About this volume a reviewer wrote 'The editor and the contributors are to be praised for having accomplished a truly Herculean task through which this period finally receives the recognition it deserves. There is nothing comparable on the German, or any other, scholarly book market.' The CH history is prima facie the most voluminous recent analysis of German literature in English; it engaged the collaboration of Germanists from the U.S., the U.K., Germany, Austria, and Australia. This is perhaps the most significant achievement to date of Camden House.

In recent years Camden House has branched out into North American literature, extending its series "Literary Criticism in Perspective" (series editors: Scott Peeples and James Walker) in that area and having launched a "European Studies in North American Literature and Culture" (ESNALC; series editor: Reingard M. Nischik) in 1996. Part of the latter series is the 605-page History of Literature in Canada: English-Canadian and French-Canadian (ed. R.M. Nischik, 2008), Camden House's second major literary history and one of the extremely few histories of Canadian literature to discuss both Canadian literature written in English and Canadian literature written in French in a balanced way.

In 1998 Camden House became an imprint of its long-time distributor, Boydell & Brewer, and has continued to publish books in all the areas described above under the editorship of James Walker, who has been associated with the firm since 1994. James Hardin remains a consulting editor with Camden House.
