= Medieval German literature =

Medieval German literature refers to the literature of Medieval Germany.

It can be subdivided into two main periods:

- Old High German literature (750–1050) is the product of the monasteries and is almost exclusively religious in nature
- Middle High German literature (1050–1350) is the product of the noble courts and focuses on knightly exploits and courtly love

== See also ==
- History of German literature
