= Herbert Jankuhn =

German archaeologist (1905–1990)

- Born: 8 August 1905; Angerburg, East Prussia, Germany
- Died: 30 April 1990 (aged 84); Göttingen, Germany
- Known for: Excavations at Hedeby

Academic background
- Education: University of Königsberg; University of Jena; University of Berlin; University of Kiel
- Academic advisors: Max Ebert; Carl Schuchhardt
- Influences: Wilhelm Unverzagt; Albert Kiekebusch

Academic work
- Discipline: Archaeology
- Institutions: University of Kiel; University of Rostock; University of Göttingen
- Notable students: Heiko Steuer
- Main interests: Archaeology of Germanic peoples
- Notable works: Reallexikon der Germanischen Altertumskunde

Herbert Jankuhn (8 August 1905 – 30 April 1990) was a German archaeologist who specialized in the archaeology of Germanic peoples. He is best known for his excavations at the Viking Age site of Hedeby, and for his instrumental role in the publishing of the second edition of the Reallexikon der Germanischen Altertumskunde.

Jankuhn joined the Nazi Party, SS and SA in the 1930s.

== Early life and education ==
Herbert Jankuhn was born in Angerburg, East Prussia, Germany on 8 August 1905. His paternal grandfather was Lithuanian, and his mother was a Masur. Spending his youth in Mitau and Tilsit, Jankuhn studied Germanistics, history, philology and physical exercise at the universities of Königsberg, Jena and Berlin. Having studied under Max Ebert and Carl Schuchhardt, Jankuhn received in PhD in archaeology at the University of Berlin in 1931. Jankuhn was strongly influenced by Wilhelm Unverzagt and Albert Kiekebusch, both of whom where critical of the settlement archaeology theories of Gustaf Kossinna.

== Early career ==
Jankuhn completed his habilitation at the University of Kiel in 1935. Since 1930, Jankuhn had conducted excavations at the Viking Age settlement of Hedeby. From 1938, with the help of Ahnenerbe, Jankuhn organized the excavations at Hedeby into one of the largest archaeological projects in the world. The results of his excavations at Hedeby were initially published in 1936, and have since been republished in numerous revised editions.

Jankuhn's work at Hedeby greatly impressed Heinrich Himmler, leader of the Schutzstaffel, with whom Jankuhn became friendly. Jankuhn eventually joined both the Nazi Party, the Schutzstaffel, and became Head of the Excavation and Archaeology Department Ahnenerbe in 1940. During World War II, Jankuhn travelled across German-occupied Europe, where he reported to the Sicherheitsdienst on the reliability of scholars in occupied countries.

Jankuhn was made an associate professor at the University of Kiel in 1940. In the summer of 1942, Jankuhn followed 5th SS Panzer Division Wiking into the Crimea to conduct excavations at Mangup, capital of the Crimean Goths. From 1942 to 1943, Jankuhn was Professor at the University of Rostock. He spent the last years of the war as an intelligence officer in 5th SS Panzer Division Wiking, which surrendered to the United States Army in Bavaria in 1945.

== Post-war career ==
Jankuhn was imprisoned from 1945 to 1948. After his release from prison, Jankuhn was forbidden from teaching, but nevertheless continued to teach and research privately. He returned to Kiel in 1949 to work on restoring museums destroyed during World War II. He subsequently served as a guest lecturer at the universities of Hamburg and Kiel. From the 1950s onward, Jankuhn played an instrumental role in reviving the field of settlement archaeology, and advocated an interdisciplinary approach to the study of prehistory.

Since 1956, Jankuhn served as associate professor, and from 1959 professor of prehistory and protohistory at the University of Göttingen. During this time, Jankuhn founded and led a number of scholarly organizations, and edited several scholarly publications. From 1968, Jankuhn was instrumental in the publishing of the second edition of the Reallexikon der Germanischen Altertumskunde (1969-2008). He advocated broadening the scope of the series to include not only Germanic peoples, but also Celts, Slavs, Sarmatians and other peoples of ancient north-central Europe. Jankuhn retired from the University of Göttingen in 1973.

== Selected works ==
- Gürtelgarnituren der älteren römischen Kaiserzeit im Samland, 1932
- Die Wehranlagen der Wikingerzeit zwischen Schlei und Treene, 1935
- Haithabu – eine germanische Stadt der Frühzeit, 1938
- Gemeinschaftsform und Herrschaftsbildung in frühgermanischer Zeit, 1939
- Die Ausgrabungen in Haithabu (1937–1939), 1943
- Haithabu – Ein Handelsplatz der Wikingerzeit, 1956
- Die Römische Kaiserzeit und die Völkerwanderungszeit, 1966
- Einführung in die Siedlungsarchäologie, 1977

== See also ==
- Otto Höfler
- Hans Reinerth
- Hermann Aubin
- Franz Altheim
- Jost Trier

== Sources ==
- Pringle, Heather (2006). The Master Plan: Himmler's Scholars and the Holocaust (in German). Hyperion Books. ISBN 0786868864.
- Steuer, Heiko (2000). "Jankuhn". Reallexikon der Germanischen Altertumskunde (in German). Vol. 16. Walter de Gruyter. pp. 23–29. ISBN 3110167824.
