= Uhldingen-Mühlhofen =

- Municipality
- Coat of arms

- Location of Uhldingen-Mühlhofen within Bodenseekreis district
- Interactive map of Uhldingen-Mühlhofen
- Location within Germany Location within Baden-Württemberg
- Coordinates: 47°44′0″N 9°14′45″E
- Country: Germany
- State: Baden-Württemberg
- Admin. region: Tübingen
- District: Bodenseekreis
- Municipal assoc.: Meersburg

Government
  - Mayor (2020–28): Dominik Männle

Area
  - Total: 15.66 km^{2} (6.05 sq mi)
- Elevation: 405 m (1,329 ft)

Population (2025-12-31)
  - Total: 8,099
  - Density: 517.2/km^{2} (1,339/sq mi)
- Time zone: UTC+01:00 (CET)
  - Summer (DST): UTC+02:00 (CEST)
- Postal codes: 88690
- Dialling codes: 07556
- Vehicle registration: FN
- Website: www.uhldingen-muehlhofen.de

Uhldingen-Mühlhofen (German pronunciation: [ˈuːldɪŋən myːlˈhoːfn̩]) is a municipality at the northern shore of Lake Constance, Germany between Überlingen and Meersburg. The town is a popular holiday destination and home to the Pfahlbauten open-air museum in Unteruhldingen and the Birnau basilica.

== Composition ==
The town consists of the three villages Unteruhldingen, Oberuhldingen und Mühlhofen. Further, the hamlets of Seefelden, Maurach, Obermaurach, Gebhardsweiler and Hallendorf are included in the area of the commune.

== History ==
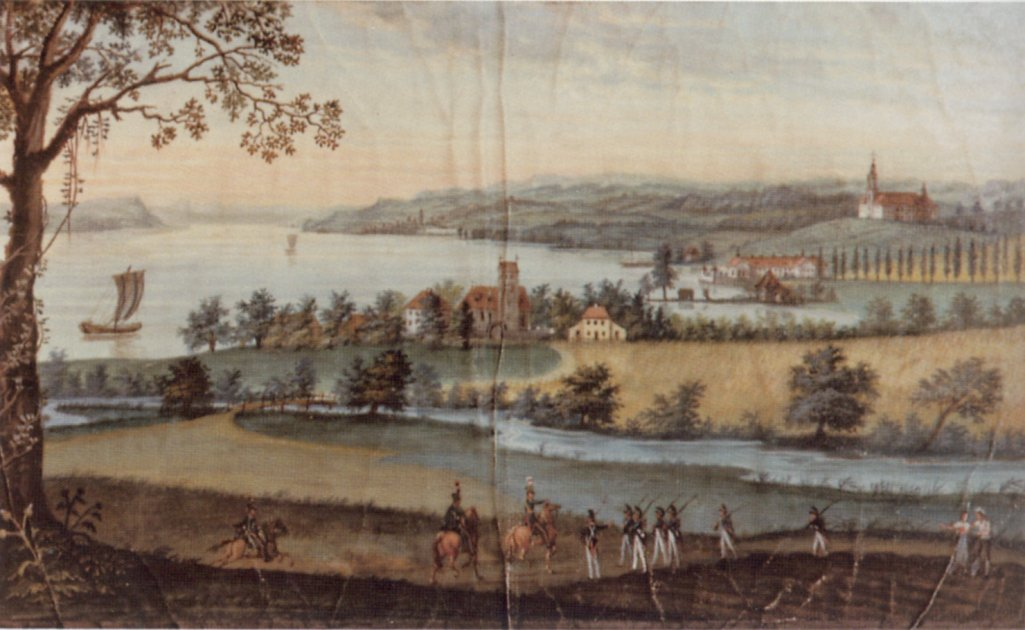
Seefelden, Maurach and the cathedral of Birnau around 1809

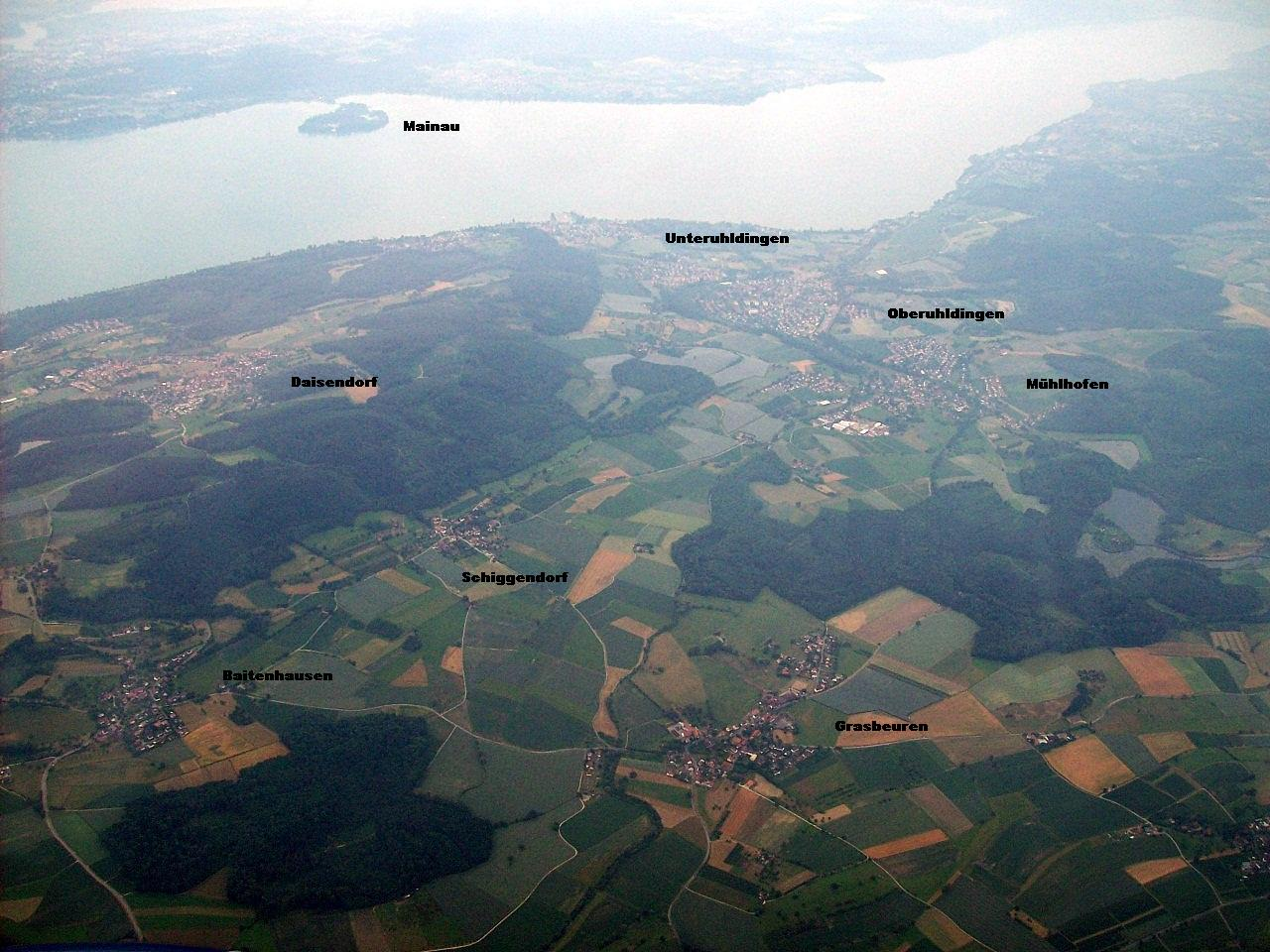
Aerial view of Uhldingen-Mühlhofen with Lake Constance and the island Mainau in the background

Archeological finds show that the shore of Lake Constance near Unteruhldingen was already inhabited during the Neolithic and Bronze ages. During the time of the Roman Empire there may have been a port, as the discovery of coins from the 1st century AD suggests. Oberuhldingen is situated at a Roman road from Meersburg to the valley of Salem (Baden) where remains of a Roman estate have been found.

The parish of Seefelden was possibly founded already in the 7th century and, along with Bermatingen, Aufkirch und Reichenau Monastery, is one of the first churches of the northern Lake Constance area. Thus it may have been witness to the first Christian conversions through the Frankish Empire. (Official documents mention it for the first time in 1165.) It was subject to the Bishop of Constance.

The name Uhldingen was mentioned for the first time in documents from 1058 as Oweltinga/Ouweltingen; later the names Uoldingen and Ueldingen were used. The town carries the name of the eldest Owalt from Alemannic times. Mühlhofen was first mentioned in 1165 as Mulnhoven.

For the year 1175 a document by Frederick Barbarossa states the existence of ship traffic between Unteruhldingen and Konstanz.

In the 12th century Salem Abbey began targeted property purchases in Uhldingen and the surrounding area. Presumably in Seefelden a monastery was founded in 1227, which belonged to Salem. A few years later it was moved to Baindt.

In 1348 the plague devastated the area.

At the hill of Zihlbühl, in the Knappenhöhle cave, medieval efforts to dig for gold were only scarcely successful.

On the lower Lichtenberg there was a castle which was destroyed in 1499 during the Swabian War. It was the residence of the lord of Oberrieden.

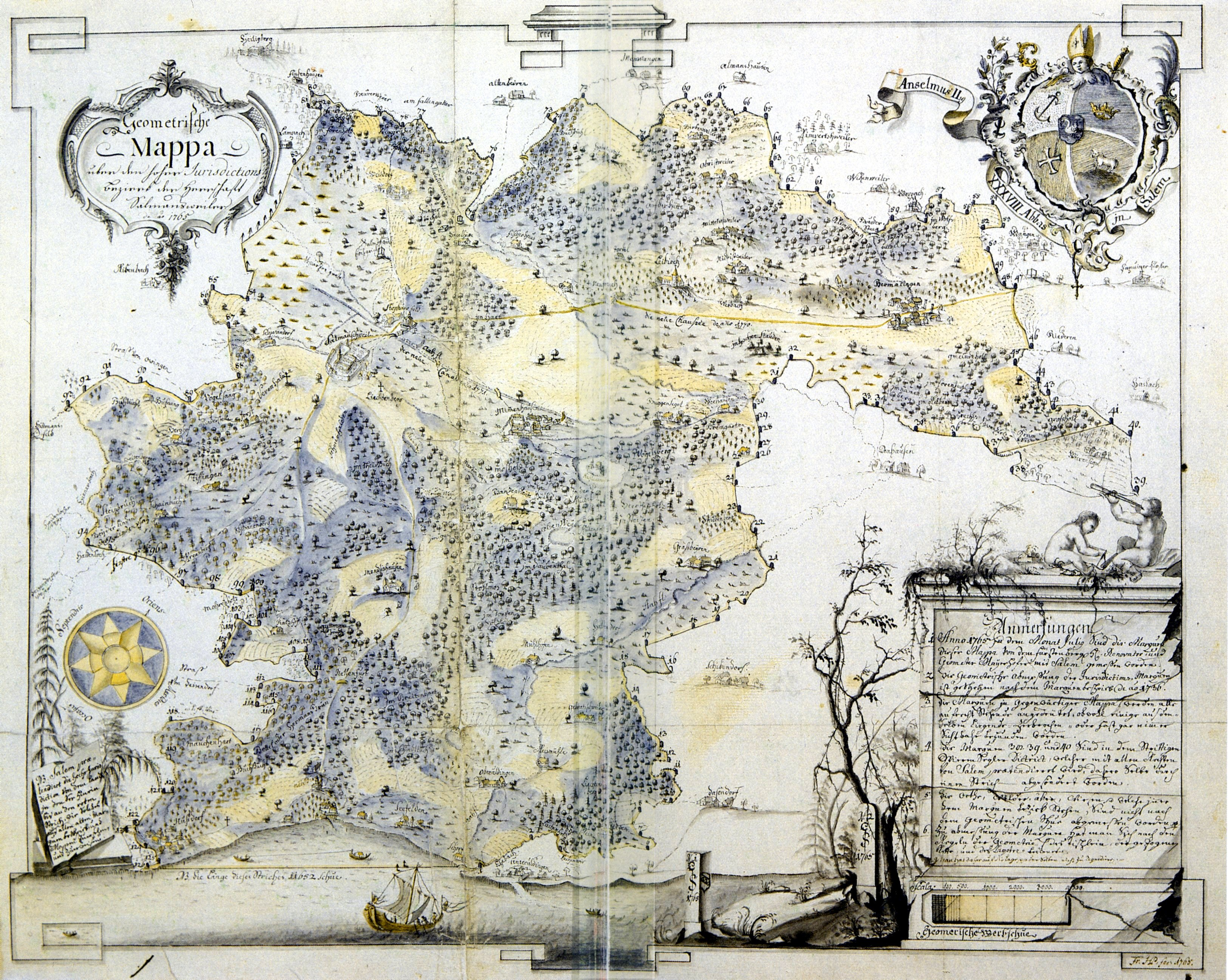
Salem area around 1765.

From 1264 the villages Oberuhldingen, Mühlhofen and Seefelden belonged to the territory of Salem Abbey. Unteruhldingen was on the neighbouring territory of the county of Heiligenberg, which became part of the Principality of Fürstenberg in 1516.

The port villages of Maurach and Unteruhldingen were hubs for goods from the Salem valley and for salt, which were imported by Salem from their own salt mines. A sunk salt ship still lies on the bottom of the lake in front of modern Unteruhldingen harbour. The Bishop of Constance also owned land here. From 1733 Uhldingen harbour was the main port of the county of Heiligenberg.

After secularization in 1803/1804, the villages of Oberuhldingen, Unteruhldingen and Mühlhofen were given to the Margraviate of Baden and became independent towns.

From 1939 until the county reform of 1973 they belonged to the county of Überlingen. Since then, they are part of the Bodenseekreis. On 1 January 1972, Unteruhldingen, Oberuhldingen and Mühlhofen were united into the commune of Uhldingen-Mühlhofen.

== Politics ==
Uhldingen-Mühlhofen, the city of Meersburg and the communes of Daisendorf, Hagnau and Stetten are joined in an administrative association.

=== Coat of arms ===
The coat of arms of Uhldingen-Mühlhofen symbolises the flourishing of the three member villages with three white roses on a red background. The three segments with blue waves on a white background represent Lake Constance and the Seefelder Aach, which flows from Salem valley through the territory of the commune into the lake.

=== Mayors ===
- 1972-1996: Karl-Heinz Weber, CDU
- 1996-2004: Ralph Bürk, GRÜNE
- 2004–2020: Edgar Lamm, CDU
- 2020–present: Dominik Männle

== Economy and infrastructure ==
Around 12 km^{2} of the commune's territory are still used agriculturally dominated by orchards and vineyards. A part of the working population commutes into the nearby cities like Überlingen and Friedrichshafen. In the town itself people work predominantly in middle class professions. There has been a continuing trend from a producing to the service sector. In particular, tourism plays an important role.

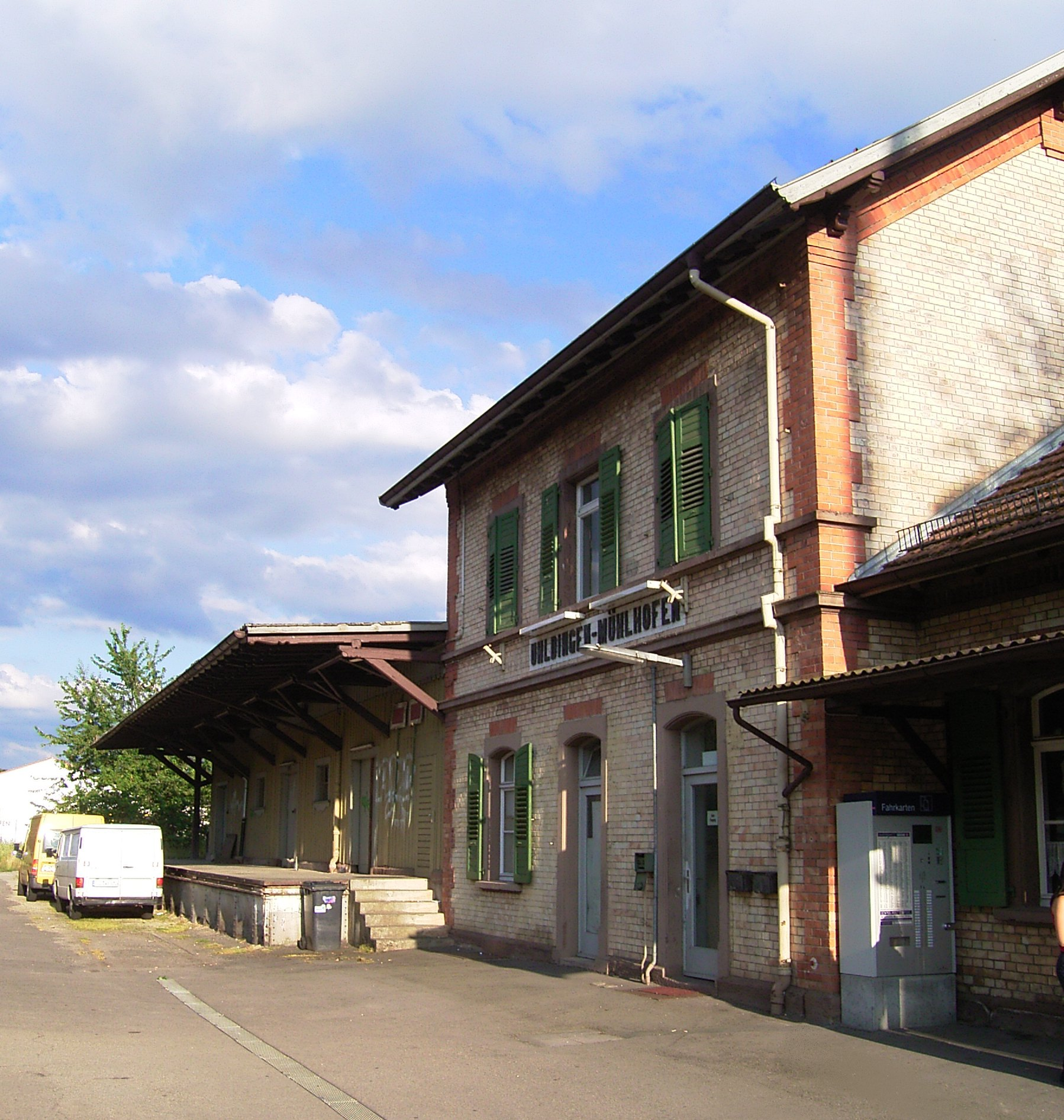
Train station

=== Traffic ===
Uhldingen-Mühlhofen is on the Bundesstraße B 31 about 7 km east of Überlingen and 3 km west of Meersburg. The holiday resort of Unteruhldingen is located distant from the Bundesstraße at the less used Meersburger Straße near the shore of the lake.

The town can also be reached by trains of the Deutsche Bahn on the Stahringen–Friedrichshafen railway. The train station is in Oberuhldingen. A bus line connects it to Salem and other neighbouring towns and holiday destinations.

From the lake Uhldingen-Mühlhofen can be reached by the ships of Bodensee-Schiffsbetriebe. In particular, there is a connection to the island of Mainau.

Parallel to the shore is a cycling path from Meersburg to Unteruhldingen, through the protected natural reserve near Seefelden and on to Überlingen.

== Main sights ==
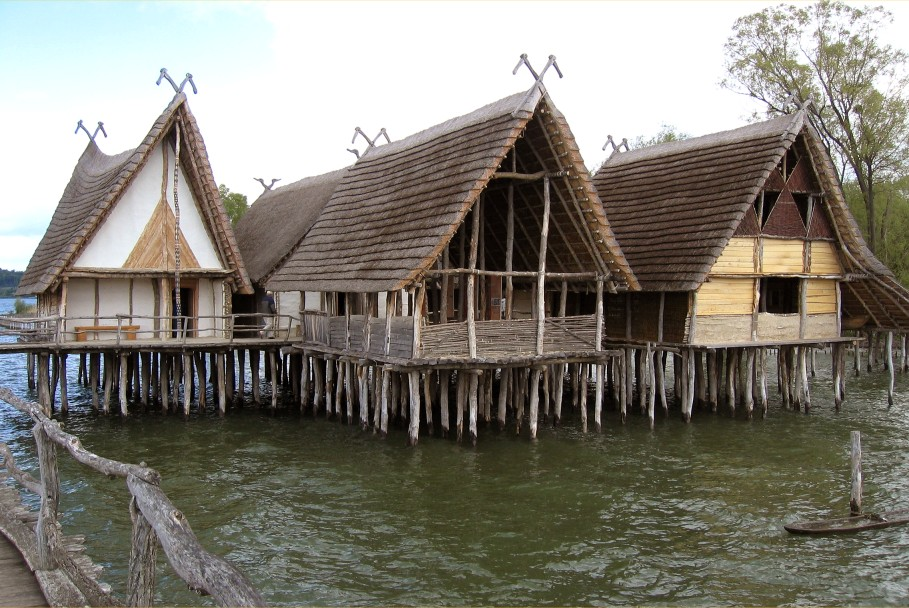
Reconstructed pile dwellings in Unteruhldingen.

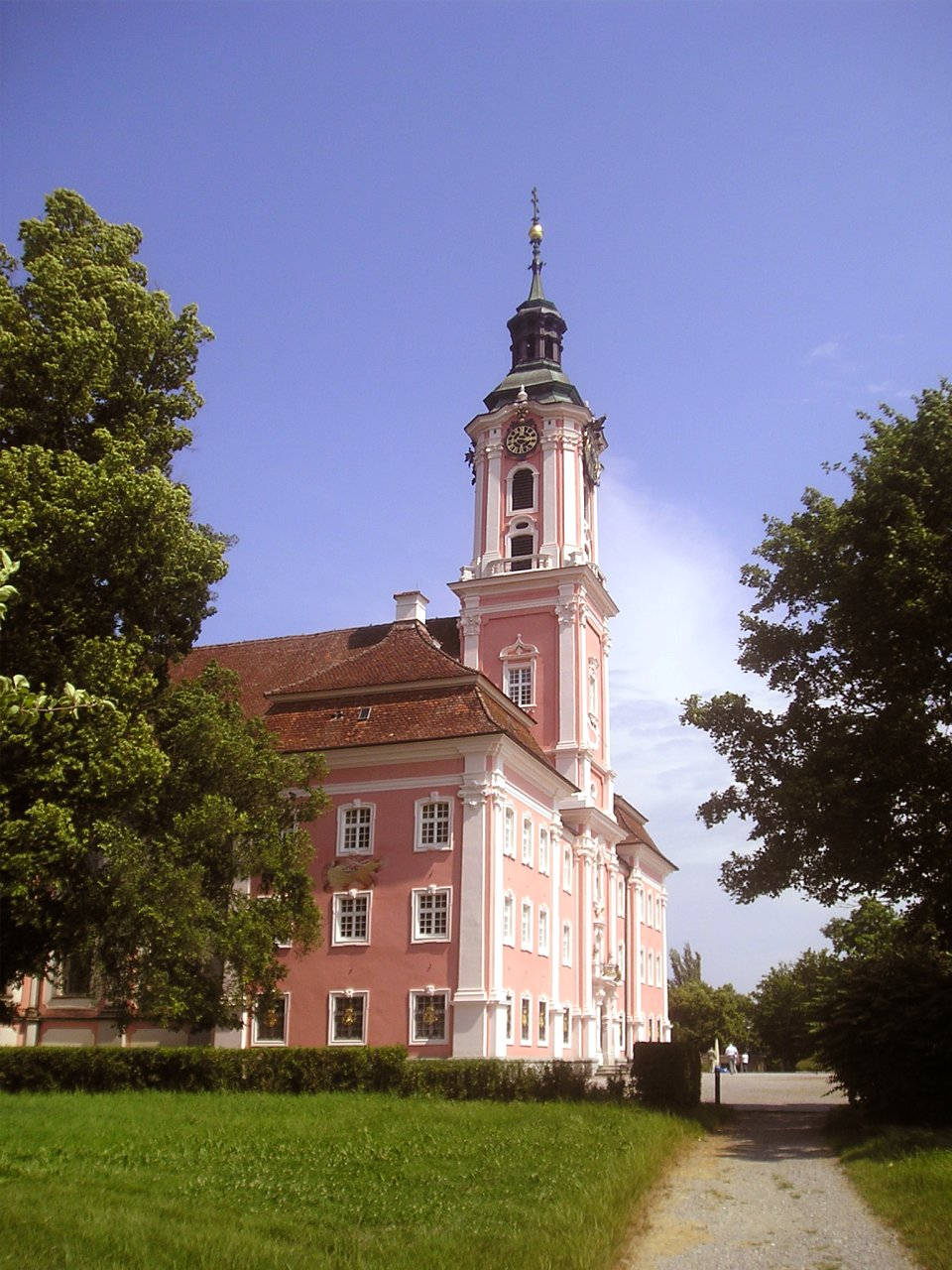
Birnau Cathedral near Maurach.

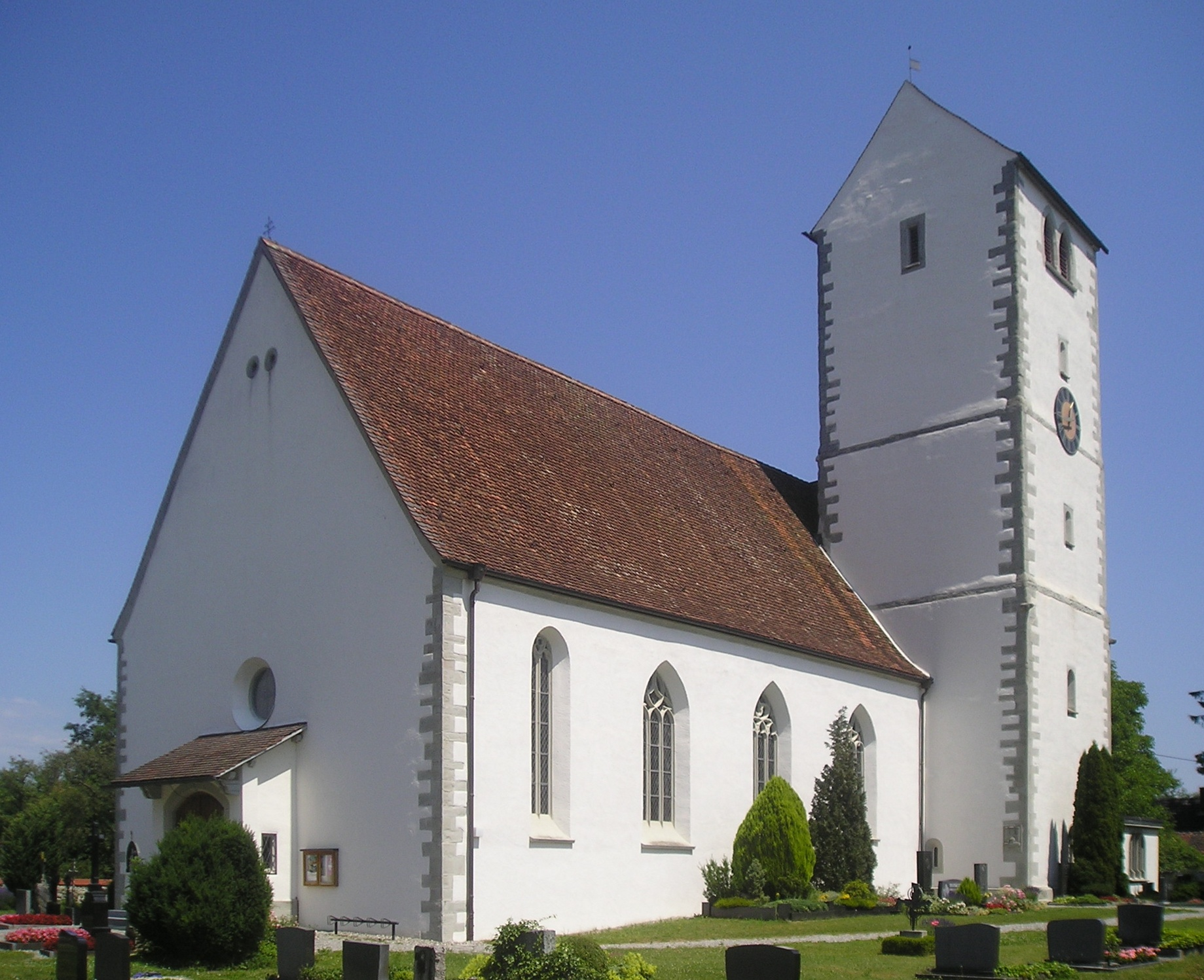
Church of St. Martin in Seefelden.

=== World heritage site ===
Uhldingen-Mühlhofen is home to one or more prehistoric pile-dwelling (or stilt house) settlements that are part of the Prehistoric Pile dwellings around the Alps UNESCO World Heritage Site.

=== Museums ===
The Pfahlbauten open-air museum in Unteruhldingen displays archeological finds and reconstructions of Neolithic and Bronze Age pile dwellings. The buildings are idealized reconstructions from between the 1922 and 1941, which were designed based on digs of the Wasserburg Buchau at Federsee. After 1945 the museum was led by the controversial archeologist Hans Reinerth, one of the leading Nazi archaeologists of the Amt Rosenberg. This museum has been expanded since to incorporate modern research.

=== Buildings ===
- Visible from afar is the pilgrimage church and Cistercian Monastery of Birnau, erected by Franz Beer from 1746-1759 for Salem Abbey. Its baroque style, the interior rococo design by Joseph Anton Feuchtmayer and Gottfried Bernhard Göz, as well as the view from the square before the cathedral made Birnau one of the most popular tourist destinations at Lake Constance.
- The baroque Castle Maurach below the cathedral once served the monastery as a port and as summer residence for the abbots. Today it is used as a conference centre.
- Moreover, there are the parish church of St Martin in Seefelden whose tower is from the 12th century. The new gothic altar is from the year 1912 and depicts the life of St Martin of Tours; the confessionals were carved in Joseph Anton Feuchtmayer's workshop and were in Birnau until 1806.
- The chapel of Unteruhldingen is from the year 1505. It has a baroque altar, which was original in Seefelden, as well as a number of wood carvings from the time of its foundation. The historical Unteruhldingen town hall, once the bath house, is also from this era.
- In the Chapel of St Wolfgang Oberuhldingen also possesses a historical attraction from the 16th century. The abbot of Salem, Stephan I. Jung had her decorated in 1711 in baroque style. The altar shows a view of Salem Abbey.

=== Monuments ===
- About 200 metres east of the cathedral of Birnau, just above the B31, is the monument and a cemetery for inmates of a concentration camp who died during the construction of Goldbach Tunnels.

== Personalities ==
=== Honorary citizen ===
- 1996: Karl-Heinz Weber, Mayor

== Literature ==
- Überlingen und der Linzgau am Bodensee. Stuttgart: Theiss 1972. ISBN 3-8062-0102-1
