= Wilhelm Unverzagt =

German prehistorian and archaeologist

- Born: 21 May 1892; Wiesbaden, Kingdom of Prussia, German Empire
- Died: 17 March 1971 (aged 77); East Berlin, East Germany
- Scientific career
- Fields: Archaeology

Wilhelm Unverzagt (21 May 1892, Wiesbaden – 17 March 1971, East Berlin) was a German prehistorian and archaeologist.

== Education and First World War ==
Born in Wiesbaden, Rhenish Hesse, Unverzagt studied classical philology, archaeology, and geography at the University of Bonn, the Ludwig-Maximilians-Universität München, and the Friedrich Wilhelm University of Berlin between 1911 and 1914. As a student, he became a member of the Christian student associations Bonner Wingolf and Munich Wingolf.

From 1914 to 1916, he served as a soldier during the First World War in Flanders, Łódź, and in the "Winter War" in the Carpathians where he was severely wounded. He then worked for a short time as a research assistant at the Museum of Nassau Antiquities in Wiesbaden and from December 1916 to Summer 1917 in the Römisch-Germanische Kommission of the German Archaeological Institute in Frankfurt am Main. He was then employed by the military in Brussels as an assistant consultant on the staff of the Flemish Occupation Administration, where he recorded Roman and late antique monuments in Belgium and northern France.

After the war in November 1918, he worked again in the Wiesbaden Museum. From 1919 to the autumn of 1924, he served in the diplomatic service. Due to his efforts to rescue Belgian and northern French artworks, he was first appointed to the German Armistice Commission in Spa, Belgium, became a consultant from January 1920, and then worked in the Reich Commissariat for Reparations in Berlin. In Spa, he met the French prehistorian Raymond Lantier and in Berlin he made contacts with German archaeologist Carl Schuchhardt, at that time the director of the Ethnological Museum of Berlin, whose prehistoric department contained the largest collection of artifacts in Germany. In 1924, he became a corresponding member of the German Archaeological Institute (DAI).

Following these years of wartime interruptions, Unverzagt resumed his studies and received his doctorate on 3 March 1925 from the University of Tübingen with the classical archaeologist Carl Watzinger. During his studies, he also gained excavation experience: in 1911 in the late Roman fort at Alzey, and on the limes near Sayn; during his time in Munich in Cambodunum (Kempten) under the direction of Paul Reinecke; and finally during his assignment in Belgium in 1918 together with Gerhard Bersu in the late Roman fort of Famars in Valenciennes.

== Work as a prehistorian until the end of World War II ==
In 1925, Unverzagt became a research assistant, and in 1926 director of the Museum für Vor- und Frühgeschichte (Berlin) ("Museum for prehistory and early history") in Berlin, then the largest German Museum of Prehistoric Archaeology. In October 1926, he took on the position as a young, largely unknown archaeologist. After 1925, Carl Schuchhardt, and after 1926, Gustaf Kossinna, retired, and the time came for Unverzagt. He first became a full member of the German Archaeological Institute in 1927, and then in 1929 the Römisch-Germanischen Kommission. From 1928, he received a teaching position at the University of Berlin, and in 1932, he became honorary professor there. In 1937, following the end of the freeze on new memberships, Unverzagt joined the NSDAP and received membership number 3,917,672. His election as a full member of the Prussian Academy of Sciences took place in 1939, but the election was not confirmed by the Amt Rosenberg. He also participated in courses of the SS and the Reich Labor Service.

In Germany Wilhelm Unverzagt conducted numerous excavations of Hillforts, as for example in Lossow near Frankfurt an der Oder from 1926 to 1926, at the Reitweiner Wallberge at Reitwein in the Oderbruch 1930, in Macedonia from 1931 to 1932, in Zantoch at the river Warthe (Warta) from 1932 to 1934, in Kliestow near Frankfurt from 1936 to 1938, and finally in Lebus from 1939 to 1944. From 1942 to 1944, Unverzagt was chairman and from 1951 to 1954 vice chairman of the Berliner Gesellschaft für Anthropologie, Ethnologie und Urgeschichte. Only comparatively late, in 1942, did he become a member of the Reich Federation for German Prehistory (Reichsbundes für Deutsche Vorgeschichte).

During the Battle of Berlin, Museum for Pre- and Early History director Dr. Unverzagt stayed in room No. 11 of Berlin's Zoo flak tower, guarding boxes of the museum's antiquities. These included three crates containing Trojan Gold, the Treasure of Priam. After the capture of the tower by Red Army forces on 1 May 1945, Unverzagt sought the protection of the treasure with the SMERSH commanding officer. According to the book by Akinsha and Kozlov, Unverzagt "knew it was better to give the art treasures to the enemy, who would probably return them eventually, than to let thieves and pillagers take them." On 26 May, Unverzagt watched as the three crates were trucked away by members of the Soviet Arts Committee. The crates were flown to Moscow on 30 June 1945, and were in the Pushkin Museum ten days later.

== Work in East Germany ==
After the Second World War Unverzagt founded the Institut für Vor- und Frühgeschichte (Institute for Pre- and Early History) in the German Academy of Sciences, where he had been a research associate since 1947 and, until 1953, Chairman of the Commission for Pre- and Early History. After the conversion of the commission into the institute for prehistory and early history, he served as chair until 1964. Since 1949, he was also a full member of the German Academy of Sciences. There, he was involved mainly in the study of Slavic hillforts, which harks back to his older interests that had nothing to do with an ideological orientation within the DDR. Already in 1927, he had been instrumental in founding the "Working Group for the Study of Pre- and Early Historic Hill and Defensive Fortresses in Central and Eastern Germany". During the time of the division of Germany he was one of the outstanding scientists who worked intensively within their field to maintain the contact between East and West.

Since 1927, Unverzagt was editor of the publication Prähistorische Zeitschrift, since 1953 the Schriften der Sektion für Vor- und Frühgeschichte, since 1956 the journal Ausgrabungen und Funde, and since 1957 the magazine Werte der deutschen Heimat. In 1959 Unverzagt received the National Prize of the German Democratic Republic, second class.

His scientific legacy of institutional provenance was initially at the Academy of Sciences of the DDR. From 1990 on, he split his time among various institutions, including the German Academy of Sciences at Berlin, the Brandenburg State Office for the Preservation of Monuments and State Archaeological Museum, the Humboldt University of Berlin, and the Museum for prehistory and early history in Berlin. In 2004, the Museum also acquired the scientific documents and materials that were found in Unverzagt's apartment in Berlin-Charlottenburg after his death, and assembled them for a partial retrospective.

== Selected publications ==
- Das Kastell Alzei. In: Bonner Jahrbücher. number 122 (1912), pp. 137–169.
- Die Keramik des Kastells Alzey (= Materialien zur römisch-germanischen Keramik. vol. 2). Baer, Frankfurt am Main 1916.
- Terra sigillata mit Rädchenverzierung (= Materialien zur römisch-germanischen Keramik. Vol. 3). Baer, Baer, Frankfurt am Main 1919.
- (published with Albert Brackmann) Zantoch. Eine Burg im deutschen Osten (= Deutschland und der Osten. vol. 1). Hirzel, Leipzig 1936.
- (with Ewald Schuldt) Teterow. Ein slawischer Burgwall in Mecklenburg (= Schriften der Sektion für Vor- und Frühgeschichte. vol. 13). Akademie-Verlag, Berlin 1963.
