= Birnau pilgrimage church =

Baroque pilgrimage church on Lake Constance, Baden-Württemberg, Germany

Birnau
- Birnau pilgrimage church Wallfahrtskirche Birnau
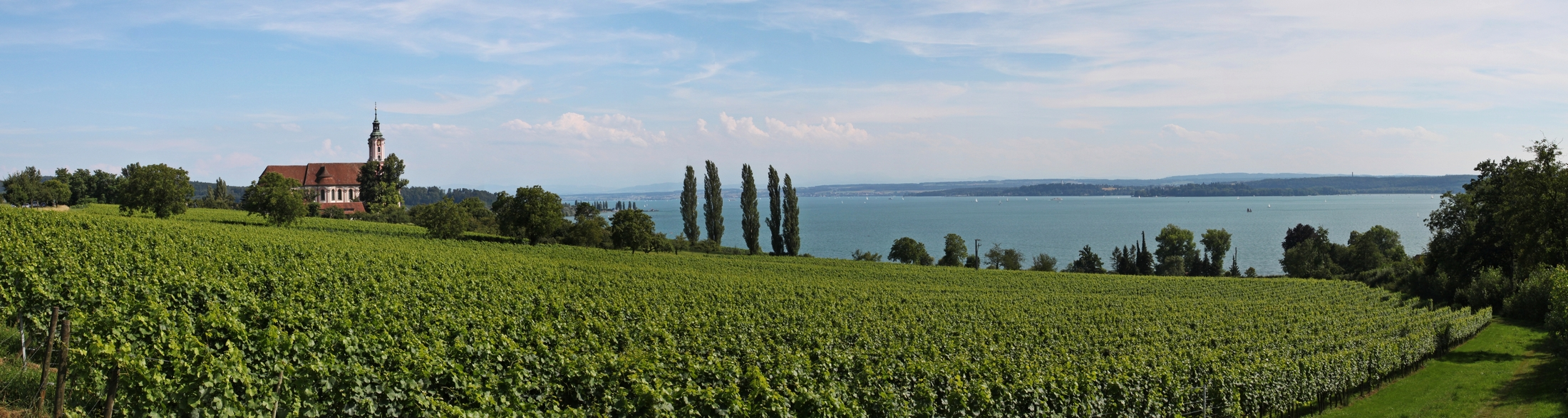
- Birnau pilgrimage church in evening light
- Birnau
- 47°44′46″N 9°13′9″E
- Location: Uhldingen-Mühlhofen, Bodenseekreis, Baden-Württemberg, Germany
- Country: Germany
- Denomination: Roman Catholic

History
- Status: Minor basilica, active pilgrimage church and parish church
- Dedication: Assumption of Mary (15 August) and Visitation (2 July)

Architecture
- Functional status: Active
- Architect: Peter Thumb
- Style: Baroque with Rococo interior
- Groundbreaking: 1747
- Completed: 1750

Administration
- Diocese: Archdiocese of Freiburg
- Parish: Deisendorf and Nußdorf

The Birnau pilgrimage church (German: Wallfahrtskirche Birnau or Basilika Birnau) is a Baroque pilgrimage church dedicated to the Blessed Virgin Mary (Assumption of Mary on 15 August and Visitation on 2 July) on the northern shore of Lake Constance (the Überlinger See) between Nußdorf and Uhldingen-Mühlhofen in Baden-Württemberg, Germany. It lies in the hamlet of Birnau on the western section of the Upper Swabian Baroque Route, directly below federal highway B 31. Built between 1746 and 1749 by the Vorarlberg master builder Peter Thumb for Salem Abbey, it is famous for its rich Rococo decoration: frescoes by Gottfried Bernhard Göz, and also stucco work, altars and sculptures by Joseph Anton Feuchtmayer.

Since 1946 Birnau has also served as the parish church for Deisendorf and Nußdorf. In 1971 it was raised to a minor basilica by Pope Paul VI. The former monastery buildings in front of the church, with their distinctive bell tower, now house a priory of the Cistercian Territorial Abbey of Wettingen-Mehrerau.

== History ==
=== Old Birnau (Alt-Birnau) ===
The present church replaced an earlier pilgrimage chapel on a hill east of Nußdorf, several kilometres from the current site. A chapel may have existed there as early as the late 9th century: an 883 exchange document between Reichenau Abbey and Charles the Fat mentions a chapel ad pirningas (“for pilgrims”) that may refer to Alt-Birnau. By 1227 a nunnery is recorded, possibly linked to Salem Abbey.

From at least 1241 part of the land belonged to Salem Abbey, which already possessed a Marian chapel there. By 1317 it had become a popular pilgrimage site, as attested by two surviving indulgence letters. Pastoral care was provided by secular priests until Pope Urban VI incorporated the chapel into Salem Abbey on 27 March 1384. Jurisdiction remained with the Diocese of Constance.

In the 14th century (or earlier) the chapel was enlarged by building a larger church around it so the original miracle-working chapel could remain intact. Around 1420 a late-Gothic “miracle-working image” of the Virgin from the Salzkammergut was installed; it still occupies the centre of the new church's iconographic programme. The pilgrimage grew steadily, requiring repeated extensions in the 16th and 17th centuries. The outer church was destroyed in the Thirty Years’ War; the inner chapel is said to have been spared, and the statue rescued. After the war the pilgrimage revived.

The old church was a simple gabled hall with a roof turret (typical for Cistercian buildings) instead of a tower. Interior paintings were by Hans Winterlin, the 1656 high altar by Melchior Binder, and its altarpiece by Johann Christoph Storer (now in Rottenmünster Abbey church). Side altars were dedicated to St Erasmus and St Joseph, with paintings by Franz Carl Stauder.

Despite constant resistance from the Imperial City of Überlingen, which owned the surrounding land, Salem kept expanding the complex. Tensions occasionally turned violent; in 1742 Überlingen citizens destroyed the half-built economic wing. In 1745 Abbot Stephan Enroth decided to abandon the cramped and dilapidated site and build a completely new church on abbey-owned land.

=== Construction of the new church (1746–1750) ===
Permission from Pope Benedict XIV was obtained secretly in 1746. After Abbot Stephan's sudden death, his successor Anselm II Schwab pressed ahead energetically. The Vorarlberg architect Peter Thumb, then at the peak of his career, was commissioned. After several rejected designs a compromise was reached; construction began in 1747 and the foundation stone was laid on 11 June 1747.

The site chosen was a promontory above the abbey's own vineyards and the existing Maurach manor, with the façade facing the lake to create a dramatic landmark visible from afar. The altar could not be oriented eastwards without sacrificing this effect, so the church and altar face roughly south-south-east.

The building cost 150,000 gulden and was completed in under four years. Consecration took place from 19 to 24 September 1750.

== Architecture ==
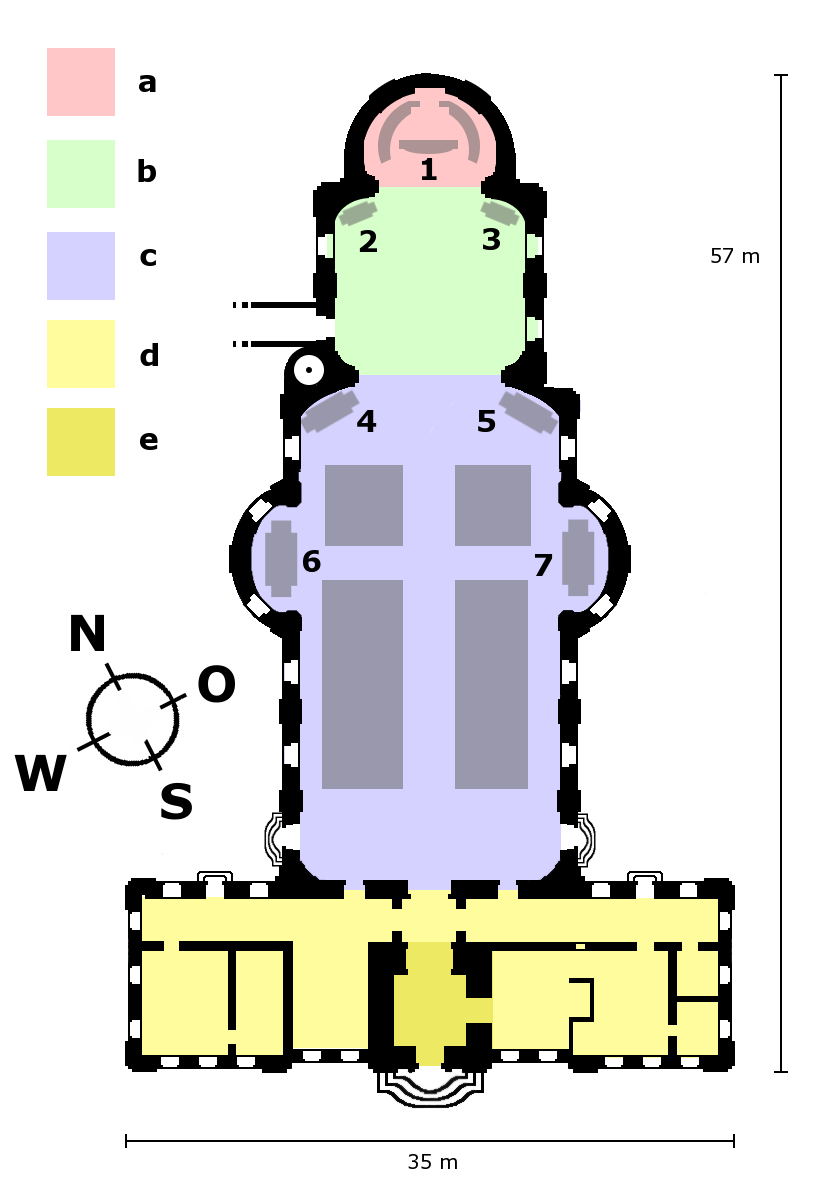
Ground plan

The complex consists of a long single-nave hall church preceded by a transverse block containing monastic and (today) commercial rooms. The façade has eleven window axes divided by three pairs of giant Ionic pilasters. Instead of a central risalit it is crowned by a three-stage bell tower – unusual for a Cistercian church but made acceptable by placing it outside the sacred building proper.

The interior is a hall church without aisles. Peter Thumb abandoned the traditional Vorarlberg münster scheme (based on Il Gesù) in favour of a simpler space that allowed greater freedom for painting and sculpture. A continuous gallery at half height connects to the organ loft; two shallow conches in the fourth bay accommodate side altars.

The nave narrows in three sections towards the choir, which is covered by a flat dome. The apse forms almost a three-quarter circle and tightly encloses Feuchtmayer's canopy altar.

== Interior decoration and iconographic programme ==
The Rococo interior was created simultaneously by architect Peter Thumb, fresco painter Gottfried Bernhard Göz and stucco sculptor Joseph Anton Feuchtmayer in close collaboration – a rare achievement in Baroque church building.

The sophisticated theological programme centres on the miracle-working image of Mary and on the Cistercian order's self-image. Mary is linked typologically to Old Testament figures (Esther, Judith) and presented as the order's special patron. The builders (abbots and donors) appear prominently in the ceiling frescoes, celebrating the new church as a gift to the Virgin.

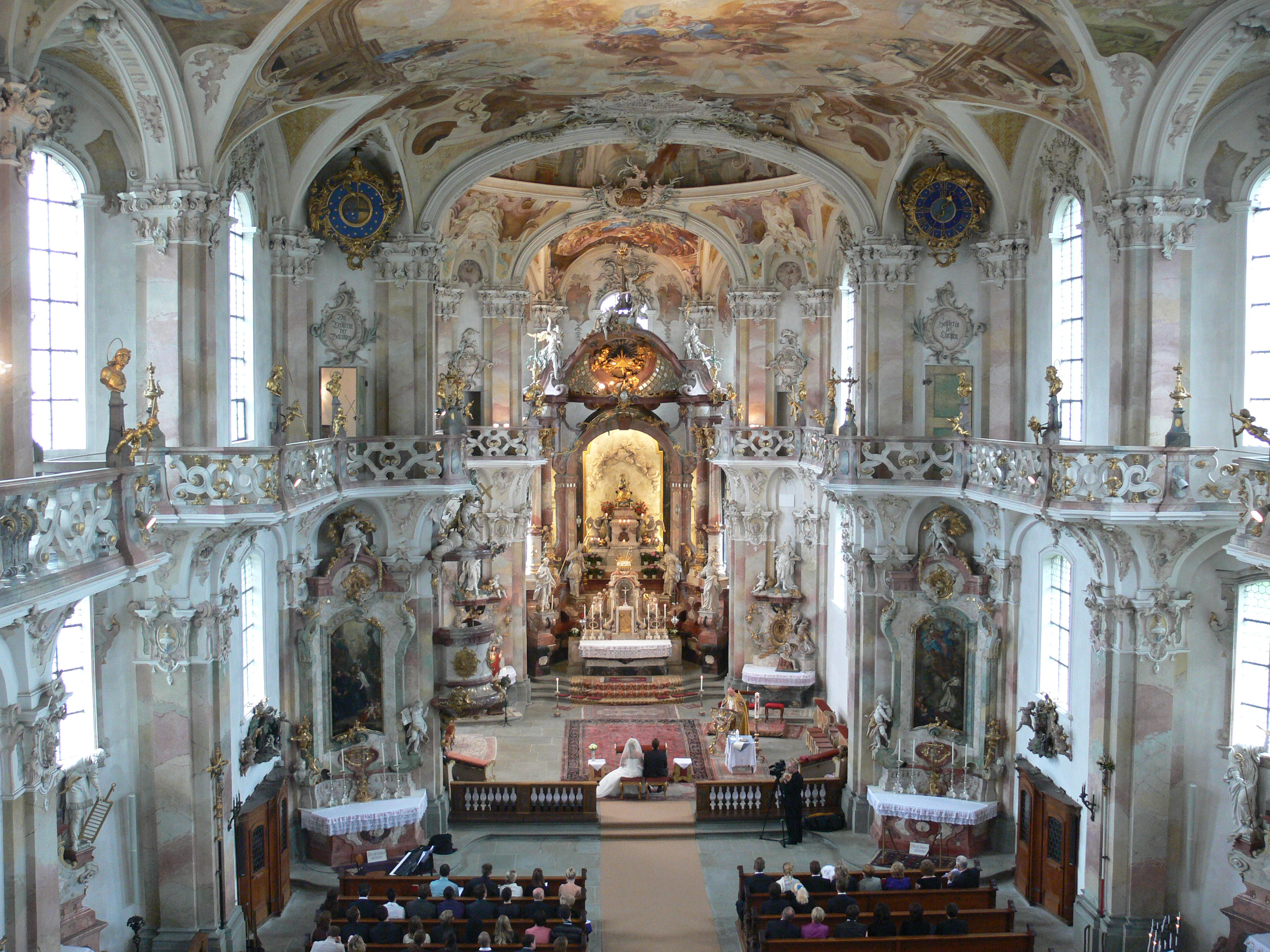

=== Ceiling frescoes ===
- Apse: Queen Esther pleading with King Ahasuerus; above, Christ about to hurl arrows of wrath, restrained by Mary's intercession.
- Choir dome: Mary as the Woman of the Apocalypse, pregnant with the Christ child; a real mirror reflects light from a hidden window.
- Nave: western half – angel concert; eastern half – Mary modelled on the statue below, surrounded by founders (Guntram von Adelsreuthe, Bernhard of Clairvaux) and the three building abbots presenting a model of the church.

=== Altars ===
Birnau has seven altars (recalling the seven privileged altars of St Peter's in Rome), all designed by Joseph Anton Feuchtmayer in coloured stucco marble:

- Two outermost side altars (St Erasmus and St Joseph) retain paintings from Alt-Birnau.
- St Bernard altar – the famous Lactatio Bernardi (Bernard receiving milk from the Virgin's breast) and the Honigschlecker putto.
- St Benedict altar.
- Choir side altars to John the Baptist and John the Evangelist (white reliefs only).
- High altar with canopy and the miracle-working image beneath the Eye of Providence.

=== Miracle-working image (Gnadenbild) ===
The circa 80 cm high late-Gothic seated Madonna (c. 1420, Salzkammergut) was transferred with great ceremony in 1750 and placed above the high altar. It shows Mary crowned, holding the Child who grasps a crucifix; a crescent moon is at her feet.

=== Organ ===
The present organ (1991) was built by Mönch Orgelbau (Überlingen) with 39 stops on three manuals and pedal.

=== Bells ===
The tower houses a five-bell peal. The current ringing order was changed in 1990 for structural reasons.

== Later history ==
After the secularisation of Salem Abbey in 1803/04 the church stood empty and fell into decay. In 1919 the Cistercians of Wettingen-Mehrerau bought the complex, restored it and reopened the church on 20 November 1919. It was closed again 1941–1945 under National Socialism. Since 1946 it has been the parish church for the surrounding villages and was declared a minor basilica in 1971.

Near the church lies a cemetery for 97 victims of the Aufkirch concentration camp, a sub-camp of Dachau concentration camp.

== Bibliography ==
- Bisemberger, Matthias (1751). Maria in Neu-Bürnau, oder Fortsetzung des gründlich- und wahrhaften Berichts von Ubersetzung der Marianischen Wallfart zu Bürnau.
- Brommer, Hermann. Basilika Unserer Lieben Frau, Birnau am Bodensee (= Kleiner Kunstführer Nr. 435). 43rd revised ed. Regensburg: Schnell & Steiner, 2010. ISBN 978-3-7954-4005-3.
- David Ganz: Gottesmutter und Honigschlecker. Klösterlicher Besitzanspruch und kulinarische Seherfahrung in der Wallfahrtskirche Neu-Birnau. In: David Ganz, Georg Henkel (Ed.): Visualität und Religion in der Vormoderne. Reimer, Berlin 2004, pp. 173–218.
- Hans Jensen: Schach dem Abt. Herder, Freiburg i. Br. 1953, ISBN 3-451-17739-0. (Roman über die Entstehung der Wallfahrtskirche.)
- Hans Möhrle: Die Cistercienser-Probstei Birnau bei Überlingen am Bodensee. Feyel, Überlingen 1920.
- Ulrich Knapp: Die Wallfahrtskirche Birnau, Planungs- und Baugeschichte. Gessler, Friedrichshafen 1989, ISBN 3-922137-58-X. (Collection of sources with construction plans and design drawings.)
- Bernd Mathias Kremer (Ed.): Barockjuwel am Bodensee. 250 Jahre Wallfahrtskirche Birnau. Fink, Lindenberg 2000, ISBN 3-933784-71-9. (Presentations on aspects of architectural, art, and monastic history.)
