= Hans Reinerth =

German philologist

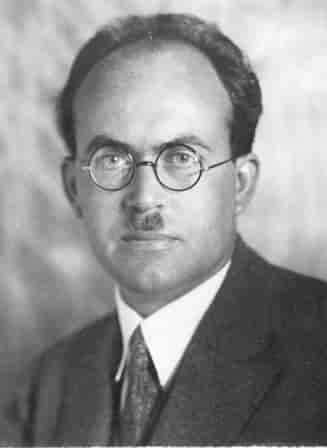
- Born: 13 May 1900; Bistritz, Austria-Hungary
- Died: 13 April 1990 (aged 89); Unteruhldingen, Germany

Academic background
- Education: University of Tübingen
- Academic advisor: Gustaf Kossinna

Academic work
- Discipline: Archaeology
- Sub-discipline: Settlement archaeology
- Institutions: University of Berlin
- Main interests: Archaeology of Germanic peoples

Hans Reinerth (13 May 1900, in Bistritz, Austria-Hungary – 13 April 1990, in Unteruhldingen, Baden-Württemberg, Germany) was a German archaeologist. He was a pioneer of Palynology (pollen analysis) and modern settlement archaeology, but is controversial because of his role before and during the period of National Socialism.

== Life ==
Hans Reinerth was born in Bistritz, Austria-Hungary on 13 May 1900 to a Transylvania Saxon family. Reinerth completed his doctorate in 1921 in Tübingen in a short course of study, followed in 1925 by habilitation. The Tübingen Prehistoric Research Institute (Tübinger Urgeschichtliche Forschungsinstitut ) under the direction of Robert Rudolf Schmidt carried out extensive excavations at the Federsee, where Reinerth soon played an important role. He examined, among other things, the Bronze Age water castle at Buchau, but never published a complete report of the excavation during his life.

Reinerth was a member of the völkisch-minded, anti-Semitic Militant League for German Culture (Kampfbund für deutsche Kultur) and joined the Nazi Party in 1931. In March 1933 he signed the declaration of 300 professors for Adolf Hitler (Erklärung von 300 Hochschullehrern für Adolf Hitler). From 1933 until the end of the Second World War Reinerth was head of the Reichsbund für Deutsche Vorgeschichte. In 1944 he was elected a member of the Academy of Sciences Leopoldina.

In 1934 Reinerth succeeded Gustaf Kossinna in the chair at the University of Berlin. He became editor of the magazines Germanen-Erbe and Mannus, Zeitschrift für Deutsche Vorgeschichte and in addition was department head for pre- and early history with the Nationalsozialistischen Kulturgemeinde, the successor organization of the Kampfbund. In 1936 he was instrumental in the construction of the Archaeological Open Air Museum in Oerlinghausen. In 1937 he wrote in the magazine Volk und Heimat: "Whoever reviles and depreciates our Germanic ancestors is no longer confronted today with the isolated nationalist fighter but with the united front of all National Socialist Germans." In June 1938, with the Gauleiter of Baden Robert Wagner in attendance, Reinerth inaugurated an open-air museum he had designed with fourteen reconstructed Stone Age huts in Radolfzell. In 1939 he was in Alfred Rosenberg's Beauftragter des Führers für die Überwachung der gesamten geistigen und weltanschaulichen Schulung der NSDAP (Amt Rosenberg) in charge of the prehistory department.

From 1940 Reinerth served as head of a special prehistory staff for the Reichsleiter Rosenberg Taskforce (ERR), which expropriated so-called "ownerless cultural property of Jews", whose owners had usually been previously killed. In 1941, after the German conquest of Greece, he directed the excavation of a Neolithic settlement in Thessaly, by which he "proved" that Germans had colonized Greece from the north. Some of the finds were transferred to Germany and surfaced only after his death in his private holdings in Unteruhldingen, from where they were repatriated in 2014 by Gunter Schöbel.

In September 1942 Rosenberg assembled a "Working Group for Greek-Iranian Antiquity Research in the Occupied Eastern Territories", as a branch of the Institute of Indo-European Intellectual History, based in Munich. The research in this area was to be led by Richard Harder. Reinerth, as head of the special prehistory staff, was appointed as his representative in order to strengthen the cooperation between the staff and this working group. In a letter of September 29, 1942 Rosenberg wrote to Harder:

From the 21st of September, 1942 onwards I have tasked Dr. Reinerth with the identification, protection, and research of pre- and protohistoric Germanic and Slavic finds and other legacy items in the museums, scientific institutes, private collections, and other places in the occupied eastern territories. - Rosenberg to Harder, Bundesarchiv (Germany), signature NS 8/265, p. 15

Reinerth was expelled from the Nazi Party on February 27, 1945, by the Supreme Party Court. The ostensible reason was that he had "friendly relations with Jews". The real reason was turf war between the Amt Rosenberg and the SS Ahnenerbe, since Reinerth worked for Amt Rosenberg.

After the Second World War, Reinerth became director of the Pfahlbaumuseum Unteruhldingen, which for a long time provided a very conservative picture of prehistory. He was one of the few archaeologists tainted by National Socialism who could not continue their career in the post-war period. In 1949 he was excluded in a resolution of the scientific community of prehistoric and early historians by colleagues, including several former SS members such as the former SS-Obersturmbannführer Herbert Jankuhn, later professor of prehistory and early history in Göttingen, from a meeting in Regensburg because of "unobjective and tendentious science of prehistory".

Between 1954 and 1958 Reinerth was the first chairman of the newly founded Association of German Scuba Divers (Verband Deutscher Sporttaucher-VDST) In 1958 he was appointed Honorary President of the VDST. From 1954 to 1961 he led the underwater research department within the association. During those years Reinerth published several articles in the Delphin, the member magazine of the VDST, on his research on the stilt houses at Unteruhldingen.

== Selected writings ==
Editor of the magazines Mannus and Germanen-Erbe

- Die Pfahlbauten des Bodensees im Lichte der neuesten Forschung, in: Schriften des Vereins für Geschichte des Bodensees und seiner Umgebung, 50. vol. 1922, pp. 56–72
- Das Federseemoor als Siedlungsland des Vorzeitmenschen. Schussenried 1923; revised and enlarged edition with additional pictures: Leipzig 1936
- Die Chronologie der jüngeren Steinzeit in Süddeutschland. Augsburg 1923
- Die Besiedlung des Bodensees zur mittleren Steinzeit. Memorial on the 70th birthday of Karl Schumacher. Mainz 1930, pp. 91–95
- With other authors: Das Pfahldorf Sipplingen. Ergebnisse der Ausgrabungen des Bodenseegeschichtsvereins 1929/30, in: Schriften des Vereins für Geschichte des Bodensees und seiner Umgebung, 59. vol. 1932, pp. 1–154 (digitized)
- Das Federseemoor als Siedlungsland des Vorzeitmenschen. Kabitzsch, Leipzig 1936
- Editor and co-author: Vorgeschichte der deutschen Stämme. Germanische Tat und Kultur auf deutschem Boden. 3 volumes. Bibliographisches Institut / Herbert Stubenrauch, Leipzig / Berlin 1940
- Handbuch der vorgeschichtlichen Sammlungen Deutschlands, Süd- und Mitteldeutschland einschließlich des Protektorats Böhmen u. Mähren. Hg. "Reichsbund für Deutsche Vorgeschichte" und "Reichsamt für Vorgeschichte der NSDAP". Verlag J. A. Barth, Leipzig 1941
- Pfahlbauten am Bodensee. Überlingen 1977
