= Settlement archaeology =

Branch of archaeology

Settlement archaeology (German:Siedlungsarchäologie) is a branch of modern archaeology. It investigates former settlements and deserted areas, forms of housing and settlements, and the prehistoric settlement of entire regions. For this purpose, the forms, functions and developments of individual habitats and settlement systems are explored by means of archaeological surveys and excavation. Settlement archaeology has developed in close cooperation with settlement history and settlement geography. Settlement sequences of several centuries or millennia are explored in individual areas. Changes and consistent elements can be studied and compared with other researched settlements. Archaeological methods are used including archaeobotany and -zoology and spectroscopic phosphate analysis to resolve archaeological questions, mostly in the field of prehistory and early history.

== Settlement archaeology as the archaeology of peoples ==
The term settlement archaeology initially referred to a research methodology whose most important exponent was Gustaf Kossinna, who developed his "settlement archaeology method" beginning in 1887. According to Kossinna and his disciples, cultures, cultural areas and, ultimately, settlement areas of ethnic groups can be deduced through types and their assemblages. This equation of "archaeological culture", ethnicity, and race led, especially during National Socialist rule, to a fateful and alarming combination of archaeological research with racial ideology. One of the core tenets of Kossinna's teaching was that sharply defined archaeological cultural areas coincide at all times with particular peoples (Völkern) or tribes. When asked about the "ethnic interpretation" of prehistoric finds, answers were sought by linking "archaeological" with "historical" methods. Kossinna said that the basis of his "settlement archaeological method" was that it uses an analogy that enlightens dimly-illuminated ancient times by inferences from the better-known present, or ages that, though still ancient, are marked by rich tradition. It illuminates prehistoric times by understanding more recent history. In the Postwar Era the empirical collecting of facts and their chronological and spatial arrangement was declared the main goal of research, which set the final course for today's German archaeology. Theoretical approaches moved to the background.

== Modern settlement archeology ==
Since the 1920s more and more works have emerged in which individual regions have been archaeologically researched. At the same time, more emphasis was placed on investigating the settlements themselves. Researchers such as Gerhard Bersu, Hermann Stoll, and Robert Rudolf Schmidt, who worked mainly in southern Germany, were among this pioneering phase of modern settlement archeology. The excavations at the Federsee, for example, involved the natural sciences at an early stage (pollen analysis (Palynology), moor geology and geomorphology, dendrochronology, radiocarbon dating, archaeozoology and archaeobotany, paleoclimatology, material research, etc.). However, especially during the Third Reich under the direction of Hans Reinerth, the ideological abuse of settlement archaeology was particularly evident. In the end, however, important impulses for the establishment and methodical definition came mainly from the north: the excavations in Haithabu (Hedeby as well as the investigations at Wurten on the North Sea coast such as Feddersen Wierde near Cuxhaven by Werner Haarnagel were seminal. The archaeologist Herbert Jankuhn is associated with the formulation of this redefinition of settlement archeology. Jankuhn was a proponent of Kossinna's methods of settlement archeology during the period of in National Socialism.

== New trends ==
More recently the focus has increasingly been on the individual settlement and the analysis of landscapes and territories, mostly using geographic information systems (GIS). Today the term landscape archaeology is preferred. The long-standing role of natural sciences in settlement archeology has recently further increased, and geography, geology, zoology, botany, and anthropology have been increasingly used in the field of soil science, which is reflected, for example, in the field of geoarchaeology.
