= Unteruhldingen =

Coordinates: 47°43′N 9°14′E

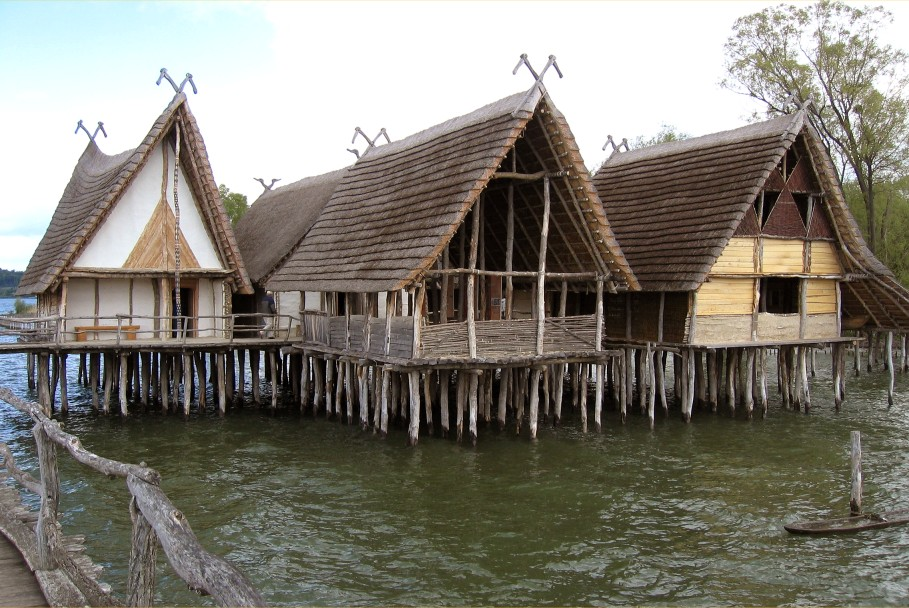
Reconstructed pile dwellings in Unteruhldingen.

Unteruhldingen is a small village, part of the town of Uhldingen-Mühlhofen, on the northwestern shore of Lake Constance, Germany. It is home to the Pfahlbauten, an open-air museum displaying reconstructions of Neolithic and Bronze Age pile dwellings. The buildings are idealized reconstructions from between the 1922 and 1941, which were designed based on archeological digs of the Wasserburg Buchau at Federsee. After 1945 the museum was led by the controversial but knowledgeable archeologist Hans Reinerth, one of the leading Nazi archaeologists of Amt Rosenberg. This museum has been expanded since to incorporate modern research.
