= Max Ebert =

German prehistorian (1879–1929)

Max Ebert (4 August 1879, Stendal – 15 November 1929, Berlin) was a German prehistorian known for his studies associated with the Baltic states and South Russia.

== Biography ==
He studied history and Germanistics at the University of Innsbruck, Heidelberg University, the University of Halle, and the Friedrich Wilhelm University of Berlin, receiving his doctorate with a dissertation on the writing style of Heinrich Heine. From 1906 to 1914, he worked as a research assistant in the prehistory department at the Berlin State Museums, during which time, he participated in excavations in Courland and southern Russia.

In 1922, he became a professor of prehistory at the University of Königsberg, and at the same time served as a professor at the University of Latvia (1922-24). In 1927, he was appointed professor of prehistory at the Friedrich Wilhelm University of Berlin.

== Published works ==
From 1924 he published Reallexikon der Vorgeschichte, a highly regarded lexicon of prehistory that eventually grew to 15 volumes. His other significant writings are as follows:

- Der stil der Heineschen jugendprosa, 1903 – The style of Heinrich Heine's prose as a youth.
- Die baltischen Provinzen Kurland, Livland, Estland, 1913 – The Baltic Provinces of Courland, Livland and Estonia.
- Führer durch die vor- und frühgeschichtliche Sammlung, 1914 – Guide to the pre- and early history collection.
- Südrussland im Altertum, 1921 – South Russia in antiquity.
- Truso: Vortrag, 1926 – Truso: lectures.
- Südrussland (Skytho-Sarmatische Periode), 1928 – South Russia; Scythian-Sarmatian period.

Ebert was also editor of the journal Vorgeschichtliches Jahrbuch für die Gesellschaft für vorgeschichtliche Forschung.
