= Gottfried Bernhard Göz =

German painter

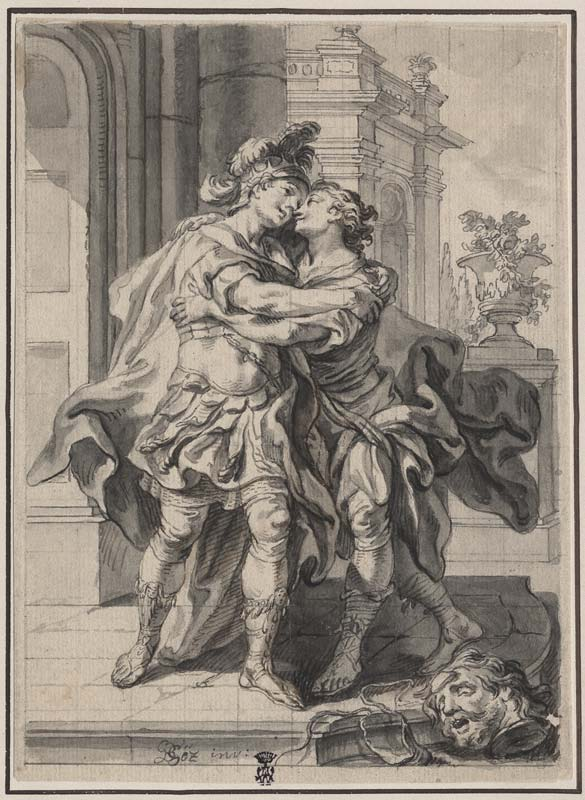
Jonathan Greeting David After the Killing of Goliath (date unknown)

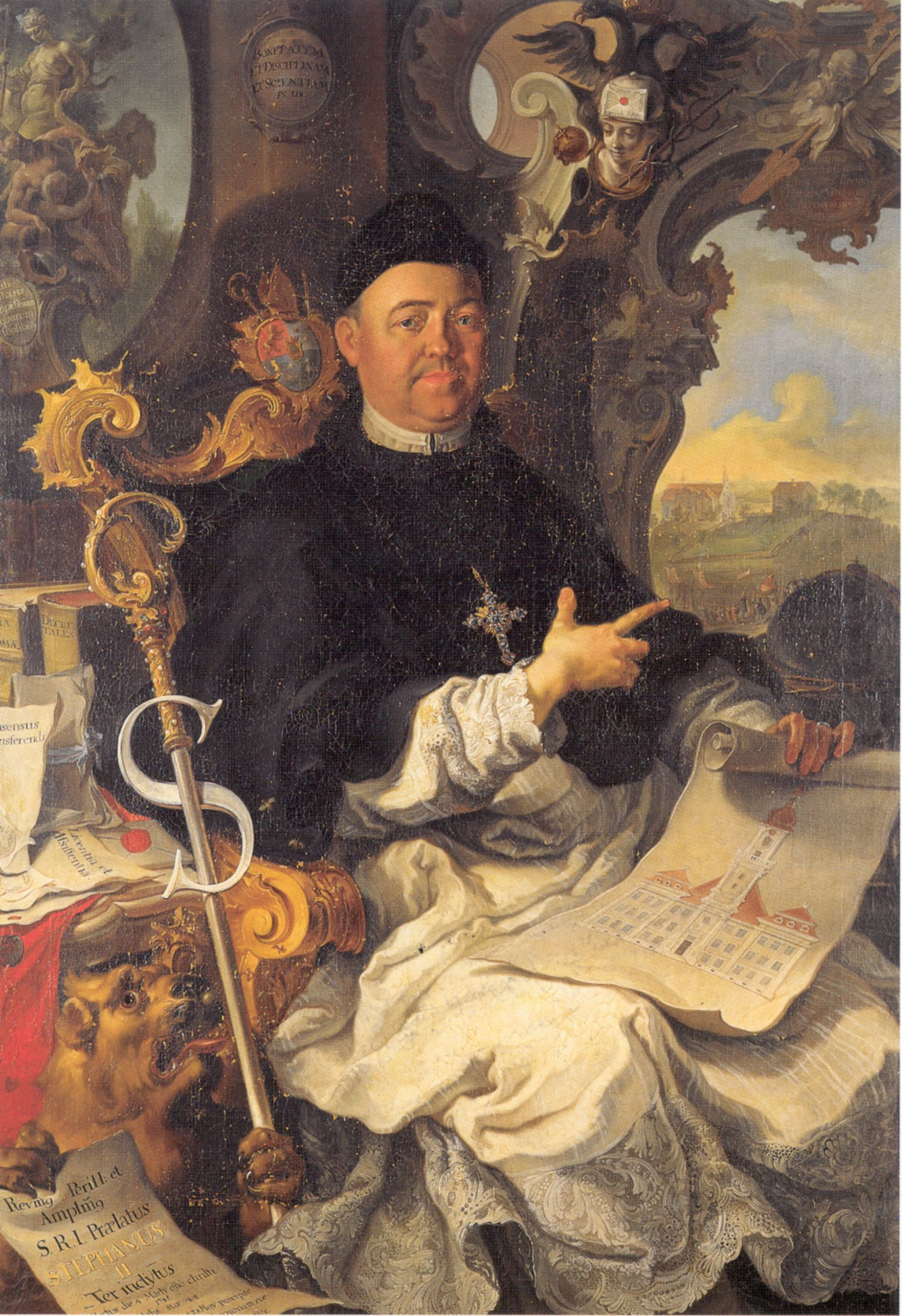
Stephan II Enroth, Abbot of Salem Monastery (c.1740s)

Gottfried Bernhard Göz, also Goez, Goetz or Götz (baptized 10 August 1708 – 23 November 1774), was a German Rococo painter and engraver.

== Life ==
He was born in Welehrad, where his father was a locksmith at the Cistercian monastery. In 1718, he was enrolled at the Jesuit school in Ungarisch-Hradisch, where he studied rhetoric and grammar. After completing his course, he obtained a painting apprenticeship with Franz Gregor Ignaz Eckstein, who was restoring the monastery church. After four years, he probably became a wandering journeyman and settled in Augsburg around 1730. That city was a center for printing and publishing, as well as business and finance, so it is most likely that he learned engraving there to gain employment. He also apparently learned etching from Johann Georg Bergmüller.

He received his Master's certification in 1733 and was married shortly after. His wife died young and he married again in 1736. For many years, he was employed by the art and music publisher Johann Christian Leopold. From 1739, Göz also painted frescoes, including the chapel of the New Palace in Meersburg, the Dominican convent in Ostrach (Habsthal) and the Provost deanery in Konstanz.

In 1737, Göz went into the engraving business with the Klauber family. Five years later, he founded his own publishing and engraving business, inventing a typographical device that enabled him to provide colored copper engravings with painting-like shades. Two years later, he received the largely honorary title of Imperial Court Painter from Charles VII. He became a citizen of Augsburg and was appointed a Company Commander in the Civil Guard. In 1749, he began decorating a new sanctuary in Birnau, St.Cassian's church in Regensburg. His last frescoes were done from 1762 to 1766 in the parish church of Solothurn. A series of large oil paintings for the library hall at Admont Abbey were nearly destroyed, but several sculptures by Josef Stammel from drawings by Göz have been preserved.

Göz died on 23 November 1774 in Augsburg.
