= Gustaf Kossinna =

German philologist and archaeologist (1858–1931)

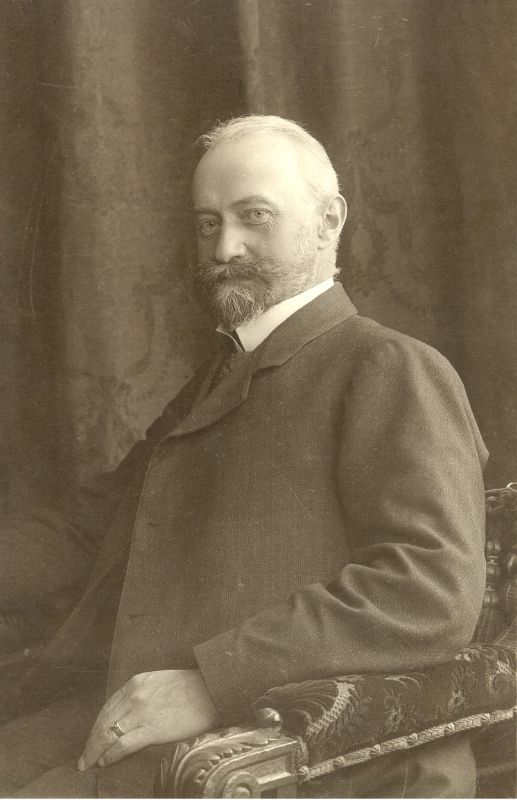
- Kossinna in 1907
- Born: 28 September 1858; Tilsit, East Prussia, Kingdom of Prussia
- Died: 20 December 1931 (aged 73); Berlin, Germany
- Education: University of Göttingen; Leipzig University; Humboldt University of Berlin; University of Strasbourg
- Known for: Theories on settlement archaeology
- Scientific career
- Fields: Philology, archaeology
- Institutions: Humboldt University of Berlin

Gustaf Kossinna (28 September 1858 – 20 December 1931) was a German philologist and archaeologist who was Professor of German Archaeology at the University of Berlin.

Along with Carl Schuchhardt he was the most influential German prehistorian of his day, and was creator of the techniques of settlement archaeology (German: Siedlungsarchaeologie). His nationalistic theories about the origins of the Germanic peoples and Indo-Europeans influenced aspects of National Socialist ideology. Though politically discredited after World War II, Kossinna's methodological approach has greatly influenced archaeology up to the present day. (Note: "Kossinna occupies a key position in the emergence of prehistory as an academic discipline... His methodology... formed an essential step in the process of transformation from an evolutionary into a culture-historical paradigm, which through the work of V. Gordon Childe and others dominated archaeology until long after World War II.)

In the years following World War II, Kossinna's theories of settlement archaeology were widely dismissed as pseudoscience. Recent discoveries in archaeogenetics have prompted a renewed discussion of Kossinna's legacy and the significance of migration in prehistory. (Note: "This new historical interpretation rests on relatively solid ground, and represents a return to a more dramatic past than the prevailing model of cultural and technological transmissions. Some may not like it for its resemblance to an older paradigm of migrations as a primary cause of cultural change, as represented by Gustav Kossinna and Gordon Childe...") (Note: "One might eventually look back at June 2015 as a turning point for all archaeologists dealing with the 3rd millennium BCE and the c.30 centuries thereafter... Gustaf Kossinna (1859-1931) is indeed the natural keyword here, the messages coming out of these high-flying scientific papers strongly remind any Prehistorian of his [theories]...")

== Life ==
He was born in Tilsit, East Prussia, Kingdom of Prussia. His father was a teacher at the secondary-school level. Kossinna attended the Königliche Litthauische Provinzialschule in Tilsit. As a child he learned Latin and piano.

As a university student he matriculated at a number of universities, studying classical and then Germanic philology in the universities of Göttingen, Leipzig, Berlin and Strasbourg. He also studied German history, local history and art history. Kossinna was influenced greatly by Karl Müllenhoff, who encouraged him to research the origins of Indo-European and Germanic culture. He also came under the influence of Otto Tischler and Friedrich Ratzel.

Kossinna obtained his doctorate at Strasbourg in 1881 (Die ältesten hochfränkischen Sprachdenkmäler) in the subject of the early records of the high-Frankish language. From 1 October 1881, he worked temporarily as a signatory at the University Library in Halle, and from 1 July 1886, as an assistant at the University Library in Berlin. In 1896, his ideas were expressed in his lecture "The Pre-Historical Origins of the Teutons in Germany". From January 1887 to 1892, he was a librarian and curator at the University Library in Bonn. From 1892, he worked at the Royal Library in Berlin. During this time Kossinna read widely and published a number of scientific papers on the ancient history of Germany.

In 1902, Kossinna was appointed Professor of German Archaeology at the University of Berlin. This position was exclusively created for him. While in this capacity, Kossinna began the work of systematically building up the university institute in view of improving its study and teaching of prehistoric archaeology.

Throughout his career, Kossinna published many books on the origins of the Germanic peoples, founding the "German Prehistory Society" to promote interest and research in the subject. He became the most famous archaeologist in the German-speaking world, and was notable for his use of archaeology to promote claims for an expanded German nation. Notably, Kossinna only conducted one excavation during his career, in 1915. The bulk of his work relied on evidence from the reports of colleagues and museum artifacts.

== Ideas ==
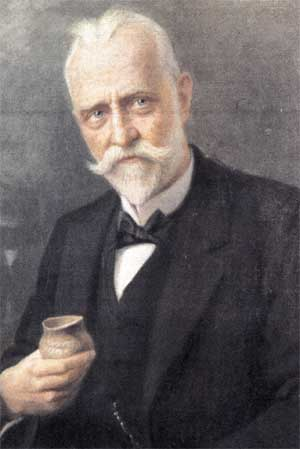
Portrait of Kossinna with an example of excavated pottery

By 1895, Kossinna had developed theory that a regionally delimited ethnicity can be defined by the material culture excavated from a site (culture-historical archaeology or simply culture history theory). He wrote, "Sharply defined archaeological cultural areas correspond unquestionably with the areas of particular people or tribes". The statement is known as "Kossinna's law" and forms the basis of his "settlement-archaeology" method. Unlike modern settlement archaeology, which refers only to individual settlements or patterns of settlement, Kossinna meant to emphasise, in Arvidsson's words, that "a unified set of archaeological artifacts, a 'culture', was the sign of a unified ethnicity."

Kossinna's ideas have been connected to the claim that Germanic peoples constitute a national identity with a historic right to the lands they once occupied, providing an excuse for later Nazi annexations of lands in Poland and Czechoslovakia. For example, in his article "The German Ostmark, Home Territory of the Germans", Kossinna argued that Poland should be a part of the German empire. According to him, lands where artifacts had been found that he considered to be Germanic were part of ancient Germanic territory.

In 1902, Kossinna identified the Proto-Indo-Europeans with the Corded Ware culture, an argument that gained in currency over the following two decades. Kossinna placed the Proto-Indo-European homeland in western central Europe, north of the alps. In studying the prehistory of the Germanic peoples and ancient Indo-Europeans, Kossinna saw the key to the unwritten prehistory of Europe.

Kossinna emphasised a diffusionist model of culture, according to which cultural evolution occurred by a "process whereby influences, ideas and models were passed on by more advanced peoples to the less advanced with which they came into contact." He emphasised that such superiority was racial in character. Kossinna’s theories aimed to present a history of the Germanic peoples superior to that of the Roman Empire. He considered the Romans and the French as destroyers of culture as compared to the Germanic peoples. One of his best-known books was Die Deutsche Vorgeschichte - Eine Hervorragend Nationale Wissenschaft (German Prehistory: A Pre-Eminently National Discipline). It was dedicated "To the German people, as a building block in the reconstruction of the externally as well as internally disintegrated fatherland."

== Legacy ==
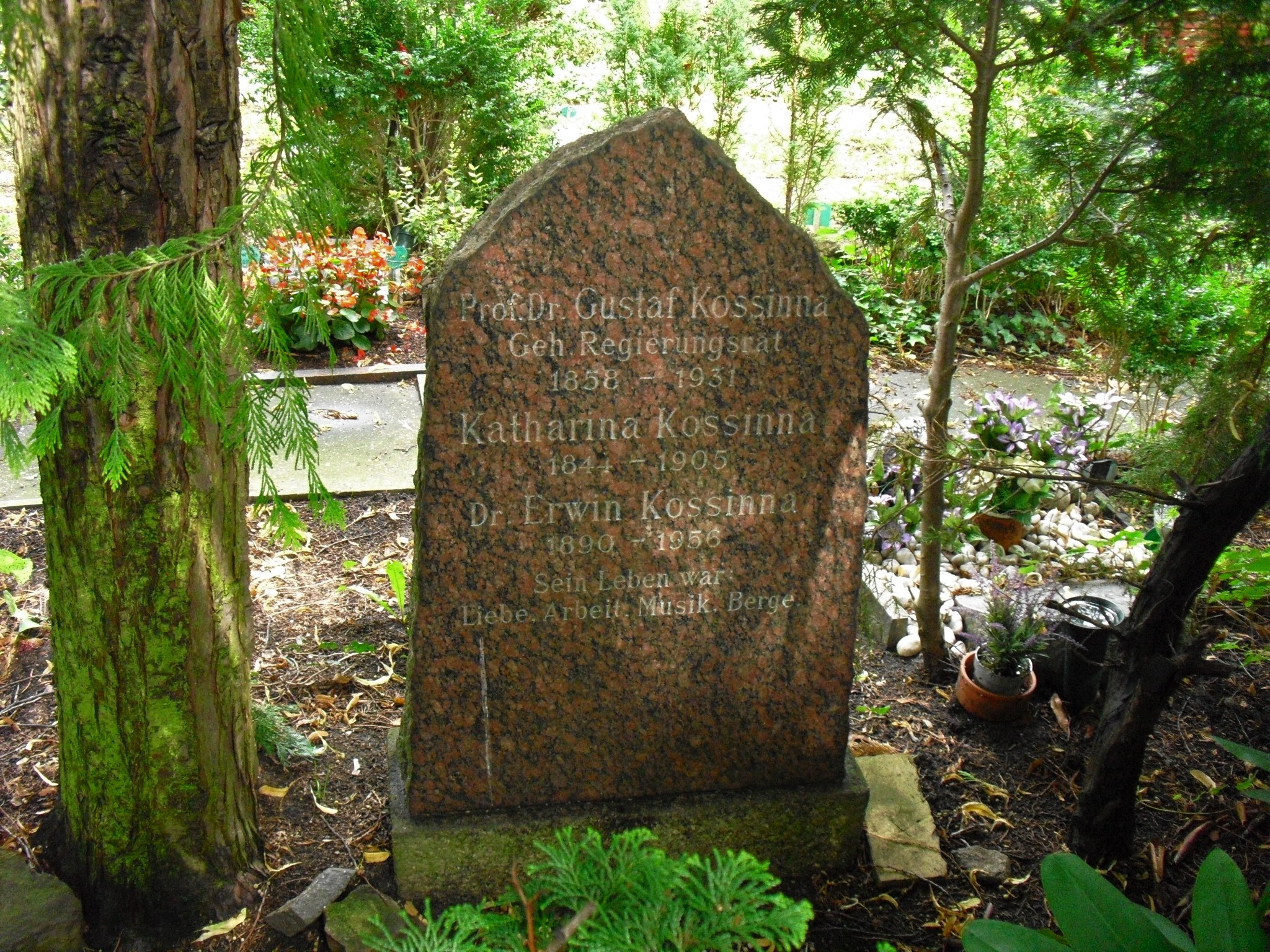
Grave of Gustaf Kossinna in Berlin, Germany

Following his death, his followers held high-profile positions under the Nazi regime, including Hans Reinerth, who held Kossinna's former chair at the University of Berlin between 1934 and 1945, and his views were incorporated into the curriculum in German schools.

Kossinna's ideas have been heavily criticised partly because of the political use to which they were put, but also because of inherent ambiguities in the method. Problems with Kossinna's theories have been summarized by Hans Jürgen Eggers.

Despite justified criticism of the method and its application by Kossinna, the central technique was not unique to him, but it has also developed elsewhere in Europe and the US. Kossinna occupies a key role in the emergence of prehistory as an academic discipline. His methods influenced those of V. Gordon Childe, whose associates dominated the field of archaeology for decades after World War II.

In the years following World War II, particularly in the 1960s and 1970s, there was a counterreaction against Kossinna's theories of settlement archaeology, and the migration was generally considered not to have been a major factor in prehistoric culture change. More recently, studies of prehistoric migration through archaeogenetics have been described as marking a return of Kossinna's cultural-historical thinking, drawing criticism from archaeologists. The apparent similarity of the once outdated theories of Kossinna has been referred to as Kossinna's Smile. Archaeogeneticist David Reich, who worked on a study related to the Corded Ware culture, drew criticism and lost several archaeologist collaborators when they believed that the ancient DNA results promoted ideas similar to Kossinna's. Reich subsequently explicitly rejected Kossinna's theories in order to win them back. Reich noted that while Kossinna suggested a Northern European origin of the Indo-Europeans, his research rather suggested an origin on the Pontic–Caspian steppe.

== Selected works ==
- Über Die Ältesten Hochfränkischen Sprachdenkmäler: Ein Beitrag zur Grammatik des Althochdeutschen, 1881
- Die indogermanische Frage, 1902
- Mannus, 1909
- Die Herkunft der Germanen: Zur Methode der Siedlungsarchäologie, 1911
- Der Goldfund von Messingwerk bei Eberswalde und Die Goldenen Kultgefäze Der Germanen, 1913
- Der Germanische Goldreichtum in Der Bronzezeit, 1913
- Die Deutsche Vorgeschichte: Eine Hervorragend Nationale Wissenschaft, 1914
- Das Weichselland: Ein Uralter Heimatboden Der Germanen, 1919
- Die Indogermanen, Ein Abriss, 1921
- Ursprung und Verbreitung der Germanen in Vor- und Frühgeschichtlicher Zeit, 1926
- Germanische Kultur Im 1. Jahrtausend Nach Christus, 1932
- Altgermanische Kulturhöhe: Eine Einführung in Die Deutsche Vor- und Frühgeschichte, 1937

== See also ==
- Culture history
- Madison Grant
- Lothrop Stoddard
- Joseph Widney
- Alfred Rosenberg
- Hans F. K. Günther
- William Z. Ripley
- Carleton S. Coon
- Houston Stewart Chamberlain
- Harry H. Laughlin

== Sources ==
- Arnold, Bettina (July–August 1992). "The Past as Propaganda: How Hitler's Archaeologists Distorted European Prehistory to Justify Racist and Territorial Goals". Archaeology. Archaeological Institute of America: 30–37.
- Arvidsson, Stefan (2006). Aryan Idols: Indo-European Mythology as Ideology and Science. University of Chicago Press. ISBN 9780226028606.
- Bogucki, Peter (2014). "The Discovery of Antiquity". In Bahn, Paul (ed.). The History of Archaeology: An Introduction. Routledge. ISBN 9781317999423.
- Callaway, Ewen (28 March 2018). "Divided by DNA: The uneasy relationship between archaeology and ancient genomics". Nature. 555 (559). Nature Research: 573–576. Bibcode:2018Natur.555..573C. doi:10.1038/d41586-018-03773-6.
- Darvill, Timothy (2009). "Kossinna, Gustaf". The Concise Oxford Dictionary of Archaeology (2 ed.). Oxford University Press. ISBN 9780199534043.
- Haak, Wolfgang (June 11, 2015). "Massive migration from the steppe was a source for Indo-European languages in Europe". Nature. 522 (7555). Nature Research: 207–211. arXiv:1502.02783. Bibcode:2015Natur.522..207H. doi:10.1038/nature14317. PMC 5048219. PMID 25731166.
- Heyd, Volker (4 April 2017). "Kossinna's smile". Antiquity. 91 (356). Cambridge University Press: 348–359. doi:10.15184/aqy.2017.21. hdl:10138/255652. S2CID 164376362.
- Klejn, Leo (1999). Murray, Tim (ed.). Encyclopedia of Archaeology: The Great Archaeologists. ABC-CLIO. ISBN 9781576071991.
- Kossinna, Gustaf (1902). "Die indogermanische Frage archäologisch beantwortet". Zeitschrift für Ethnologie. 34: 161–222.
- Kristiansen, Kristian (4 April 2017). "Re-theorising mobility and the formation of culture and language among the Corded Ware Culture in Europe". Antiquity. 91 (356). Cambridge University Press: 334–347. doi:10.15184/aqy.2017.17. hdl:1887/70150.
- Veit, Ulrich [in German] (2012). "Kossinna, Gustaf". In Silberman, Neil Asher (ed.). The Oxford Companion To Archaeology (2 ed.). Oxford University Press. ISBN 9780199735785.
