= Carl Schuchhardt =

German archaeologist and museum director (1859–1943)

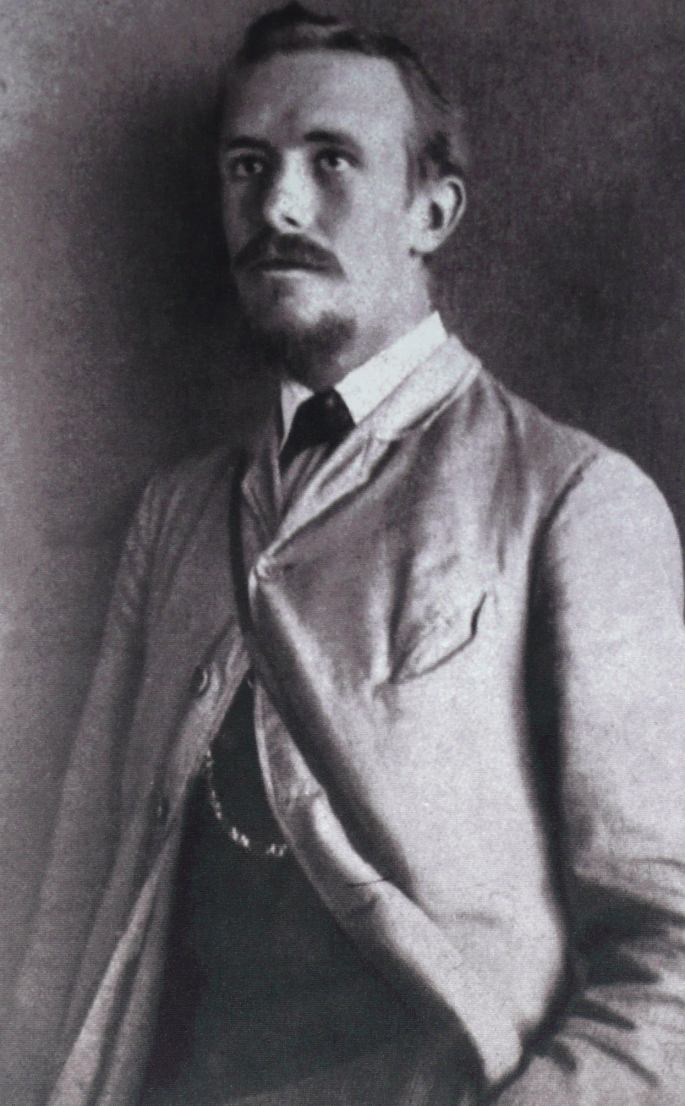
- Carl Schuchhardt in Pergamon (1886)
- Born: 6 August 1859; Hanover, Kingdom of Hanover
- Died: 7 December 1943 (aged 84); Bad Arolsen, Germany
- Known for: Pioneering archaeological research in Germany, systematic excavations

Academic background
- Education: Leipzig University, University of Göttingen, Heidelberg University

Carl Schuchhardt (6 August 1859 – 7 December 1943) was a German archaeologist and museum director. For many years, he was the director of the pre-historic department of the Ethnological Museum of Berlin. He was involved in numerous excavations, both in Europe and the Middle East, and contributed significantly to archaeological science. In his time, he was seen as Germany's most senior and accomplished prehistorian.

== Life and early career ==
Carl Schuchhardt was born in Hanover, Kingdom of Hanover, in 1859 as the eldest of four children of a prominent local copper engraver and graphic artist. After completing school in Vegesack, Schuchhardt studied classical philology, modern languages and archaeology in Leipzig, Göttingen and Heidelberg. After 1883 he worked briefly as a teacher in Konstanz and Karlsruhe before taking a position as private tutor to the young sons of Romanian prince Alexander Bibescu. His time in Romania allowed him to study the many earthwork fortifications in the Dobrogea and elsewhere, his work bringing him to the attention of renowned German archaeologist Theodore Mommsen. On Mommsen's recommendation, Schuchhardt received a travel scholarship from the Imperial German Archaeological Institute, spending 1886-87 in Greece and Asia Minor, participating in the excavations of Pergamon under Carl Humann. This period exposed him to the systematic excavation techniques developed by the German archaeologists, Alexander Conze and Wilhelm Dörpfeld. Schuchhardt was also commissioned by Heinrich Schliemann's publisher, F. A. Brockhaus in Leipzig, to prepare a one-volume popular review of Schliemann's discoveries. Immediately a best-seller and translated into several European languages, Schuchhardt's "Schliemann’s Excavations: An Archæological and Historical Study" was a significant boost to Schuchhardt's early career and remains available as a reprint to this day.

== Museum director ==
In 1888, after a brief stint in Berlin, Schuchhardt was appointed as director of the Kestner-Museum in his hometown of Hanover. From this position, he worked to develop the museum's collections and also pursued a variety of archaeological researches in northwestern Germany which allowed him to refine his technique of excavation. In 1892 he was asked by August von Oppermann to assume editorship of the monumental "Atlas of Prehistoric Fortifications in Lower Saxony", a work that would occupy Schuchhardt through 1916. He was also instrumental in excavations at Haltern and was closely involved in important national research projects such as the Reichslimeskommission (Imperial Limes Commission) and the Roman-Germanic Commission (Mason, Croitoru 2016, pp. 42–45). He also was long-term head of the Nordwestdeutscher Verband für Altertumsforschung (Northwest German Association for Archaeological Research), which took a leading role in coordinating regional cooperation in archaeological research.

In 1908, Schuchhardt was appointed director of the pre-historic department of the Ethnological Museum of Berlin, part of the Royal Museums in Berlin. He held this post until his retirement in 1925, seeing the museum through the difficult period of World War I, the beginning economic depression in the early Weimar years, and the move to new quarters. At the same time, Schuchhardt conducted a number of highly systematic digs of prehistorical sites around Potsdam, before reaching out after the end of World War I to sites in Lusatia and along the Baltic Sea, including a search for the fabled Slavic fortresses of Vineta and Rethra.

Before World War I, Schuchhardt was also active outside of Germany, studying prehistoric sites in England (including Stonehenge), Brittany and Malta. More controversially, he acquired a number of fossils and examples of Paleolithic art from the Dordogne region of France between 1910 and 1914 in association with Swiss archaeologist Otto Hauser, as well as the famous Craiova Hoard (a group of "Scythian" silver pieces) obtained under questionable circumstances while excavating in German-occupied Romania in 1917-1918.

In March 1918, Schuchhardt became one of the first archaeologists to utilize aircraft reconnaissance in establishing the course of the so-called Dobrogea Walls between Constanta and Cernavoda (Mason, Croitoru 2016, 331-350).

== Interpretation of archaeological finds controversy ==
In 1909 Schuchhardt founded the Journal of Prehistory (Prähistorische Zeitschrift), which remains one of the leading scientific journals in its field. In the following years, he was involved in a lengthy controversy with the Berlin-based archaeologist Gustaf Kossinna on the issue of the "ethnic interpretation" of archaeological finds. One of the disputes was over the interpretation of the 1913 discovery known as the Eberswalde Hoard.

The disputes with Kossinna served to underscore differences between the Berlin school of "pre-historians" that had been based in the strongly natural-science/medical/anthropological tradition of pathologist Rudolf Virchow, and the "classical archaeologists" (Schuchhardt's background) with their focus in the traditional archaeologies of Near East, Greece and Rome. Despite Schuchhardt's efforts at compromise and reconciliation, the increased politicization of archaeology and its allied fields during the Nazi period, unfortunately, did not contribute to any real accommodation between the two camps, even after Kossinna's death in 1931.

Schuchhardt was also instrumental in proposing an antiquities law (Denkmalschutzgesetz) that regulated and protected archaeological sites in Prussia. Although himself never a Nazi, Schuchhardt's role during the Third Reich has been controversial: in particular, he has been criticized for not more strenuously resisting Nazi efforts to marginalize and persecute scientists of Jewish background (Mason, Croitoru 2016, 93-99).

== Family ==
Schuchhardt died in December 1943 in Bad Arolsen, where he and his family had gone to escape the bombing of Berlin. He was survived by his wife, Margarete (née Herwig, 1868-1949), two sons, classical archaeologist Walter-Herwig Schuchhardt (1900-1976), for many years a professor in Freiburg; and Wolfgang (1903-1993), and two daughters, Ewa Hebing-Schuchhardt (1897-1985) and Käthe (1901–1945). His younger son, Wolfgang, together with his wife and elder daughter, Ewa, were active in the Anthroposophic Movement in Germany (Mason, Croitoru 2016,99-103).

== Honours ==
Schuchhardt was a fellow of the Prussian Academy of Sciences and affiliated with the German Archaeological Institute. He was deputy chairman of the Berlin Society for Anthropology, Ethnology and Prehistory, 1916 to 1919 and its chairman from 1926 to 1929. He was an honorary member from 1925 of the Lower Lusatian Society for Anthropology and Archaeology. With the death of Kossinna in 1931, Schuchhardt became Germany's most senior prehistorian during the Nazi era.

== Bibliography ==
Schuchhardt was a prolific writer and a recent attempt at a full bibliography lists 258 titles of books and articles (Mason, Croitoru 2016, pp. 104–117). His book-length works include:

- C. Schuchhardt. Schliemann’s Ausgrabungen in Troja, Tiryns, Mykenä, Orchomenos, Ithaka im Lichte der heutigen Wissenschaft. Leipzig: F. A. Brockhaus, 1890
  - English translation by E. Sellers: Schuchhardt, C. Schliemann’s Excavations: An Archæological and Historical Study. London: Macmillan & Co., 1891.
- C. Schuchhardt. Alteuropa in seiner Kultur- und Stilentwicklung. Berlin-Straßburg: Trübner & Co., 1919 (five editions through 1944)
- C. Schuchhardt. Arkona, Rethra, Vineta -- Ortsuntersuchungen und Ausgrabungen. Berlin: H. Schoetz & Co, 1926. (Extinct cities, Earthworks; in German). Akademie der wissenschaften, Berlin.
- C. Schuchhardt. Vorgeschichte von Deutschland. Berlin-München: R. Oldenbourg Verlag, 1928 (four editions through 1943)
- C. Schuchhardt. Die Burg im Wandel der Weltgeschichte. Potsdam: Athenaion, 1931.
- C. Schuchhardt. Aus Leben und Arbeit. Berlin: Walter de Gruyter & Co., 1944 (posthumous autobiography)

== Literature ==
- Carl Schuchhardt
- C. Schuchhardt, Aus Leben und Arbeit, Berlin: Walter de Gruyter & Co., 1944.
- G. Rodenwaldt, Nachruf auf Carl Schuchhardt, in Jahrbuch der Deutschen Akademie der Wissenschaften zu Berlin 1950 – 1951, Berlin: Akademie-Verlag, 1951, 161 – 166.
- W. Unverzagt, Zum 100. Geburtstag von Carl Schuchhardt, in Ausgrabungen und Funde, 4 (1959), 261 – 262.
- Heinz Grünert: Von Pergamon bis Garz. Carl Schuchhardt, Begründer der prähistorischen Burgenarchäologie in Mitteleuropa. In: Altertum 33.1987, 2, S.104–113
- W. Menghin, Vom Zweiten Kaiserreich in die Weimarer Republik: Die Ära Schuchhardt, in Menghin, W. (ed.), Das Berliner Museum für Vor- und Frühgeschichte: Festschrift zum 175-jährigen Bestehen, Berlin: Museum für Vor- und Frühgeschichte, 2005 (= Acta Praehistorica et Archaeologica, Bd. 36/37), 122 – 161.
- M. K. H. Eggert, Carl Schuchhardt (1858 – 1943): Ein Rückblick auf Alteuropa, in Ethnographisch-Archäologische Zeitschrift, 51/1 – 2, 2010, 129 – 150
- Richard Mason, Costin Croitoru: Carl Schuchhardt's Contributions on Ancient Linear Fortifications Along the Lower Danube. Cluj-Napoca: Editura Mega, 2016
