= Pfahlbaumuseum Unteruhldingen =

Coordinates: 47°43′34″N 9°13′40″E

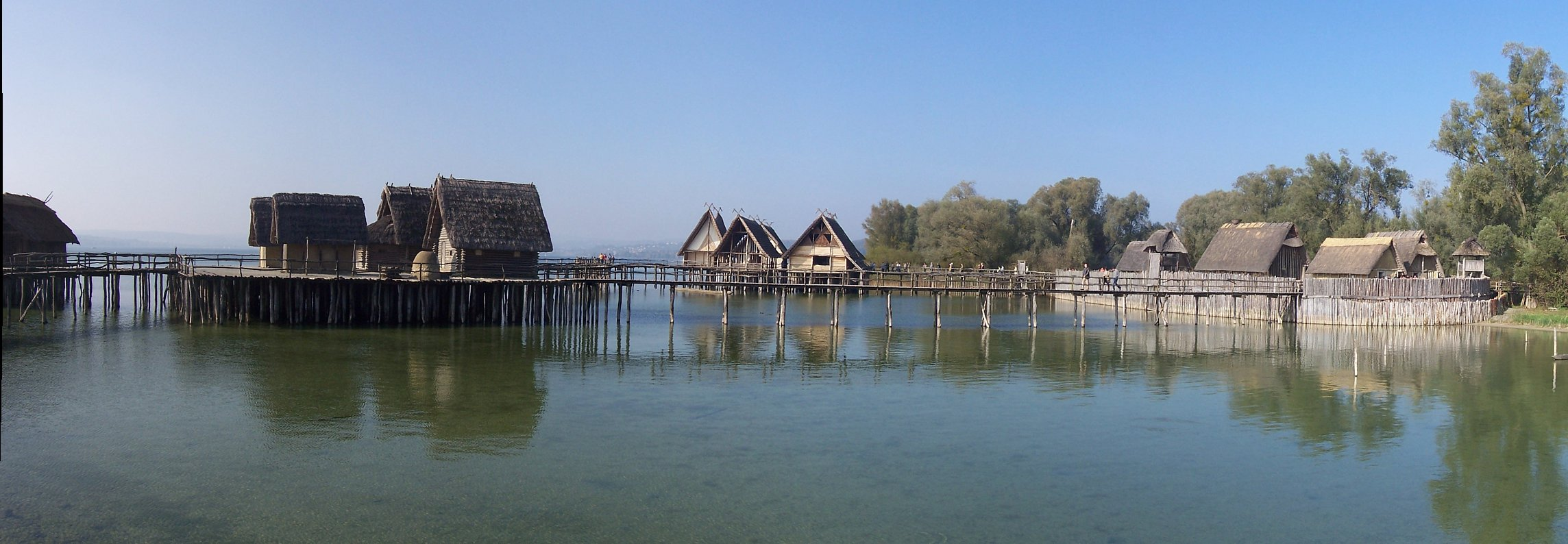
- The Pfahlbaumuseum Unteruhldingen
- Established: 10 August 1922; 103 years ago
- Location: Unteruhldingen, Germany
- Type: History museum and historic site
- Visitors: 300,000
- Website: pfahlbauten.de

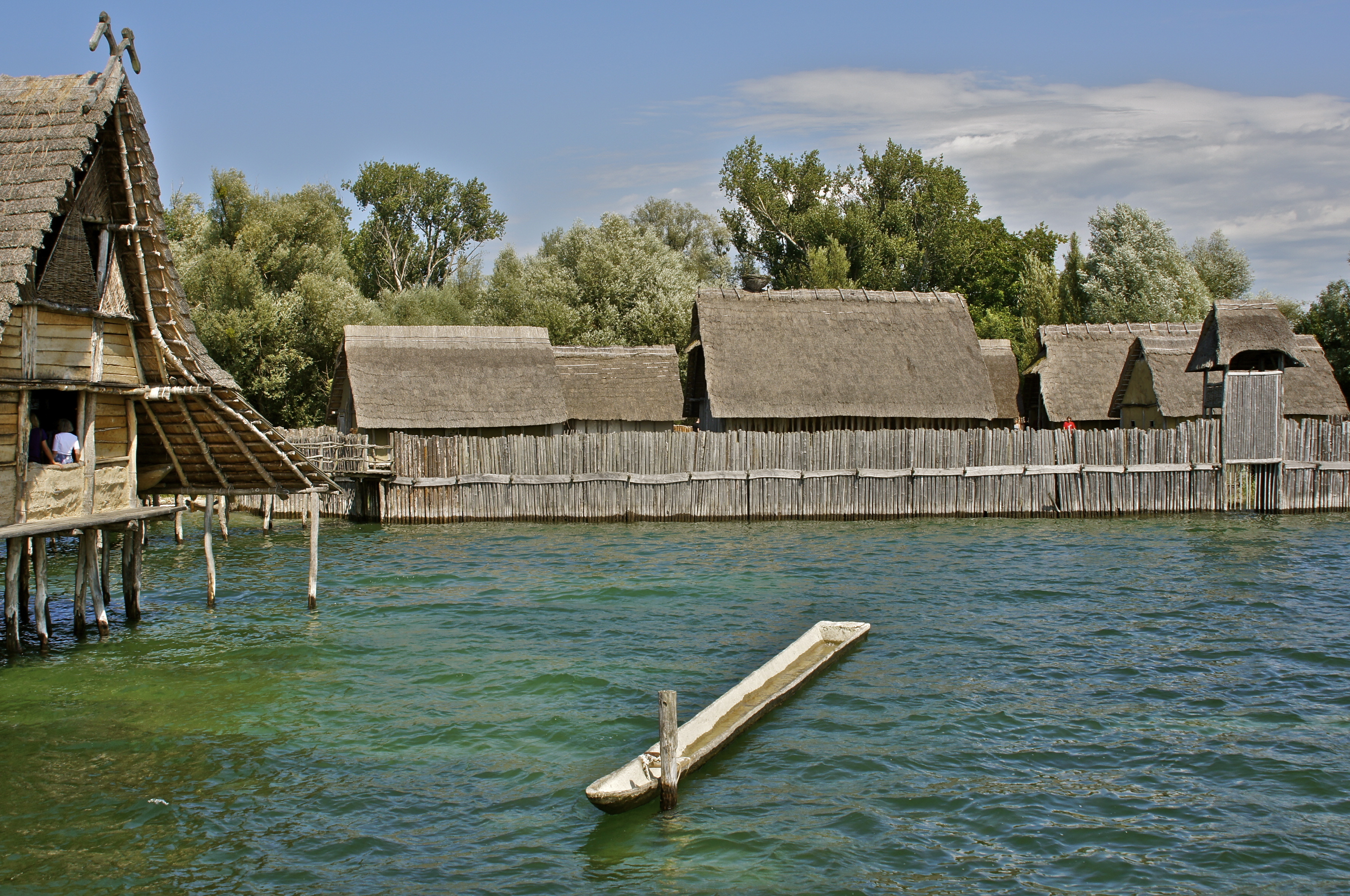
Bronze Age village reconstruction

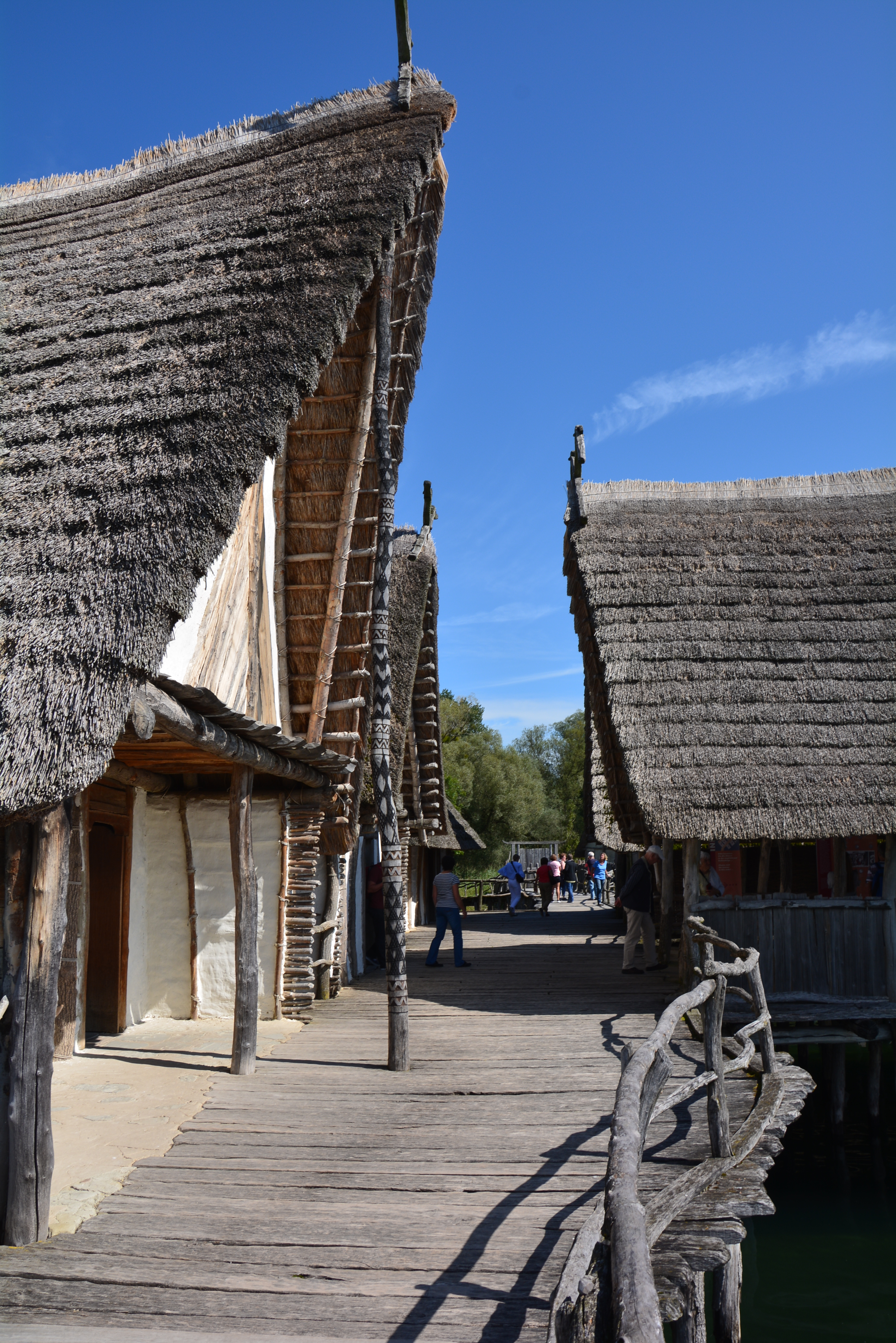
Bronze Age village reconstruction

Pfahlbaumuseum Unteruhldingen (German for 'Stilt house museum') is an archaeological open-air museum on Lake Constance (Bodensee) in Unteruhldingen, Germany, consisting of reconstructions of stilt houses or lake dwellings from the Neolithic and Bronze Age.

== Museum ==
The museum consists of a number of exhibits displaying archeological finds from the area and period.

== Reconstructions ==
The archaeological open-air museum is laid out over a large area with reconstructions of lake pile dwellings from 4000 BC to 850 BC. The museum was opened in 1922 with various reconstructions being added up until the present day.

=== Bronze age village “Bad Buchau” ===
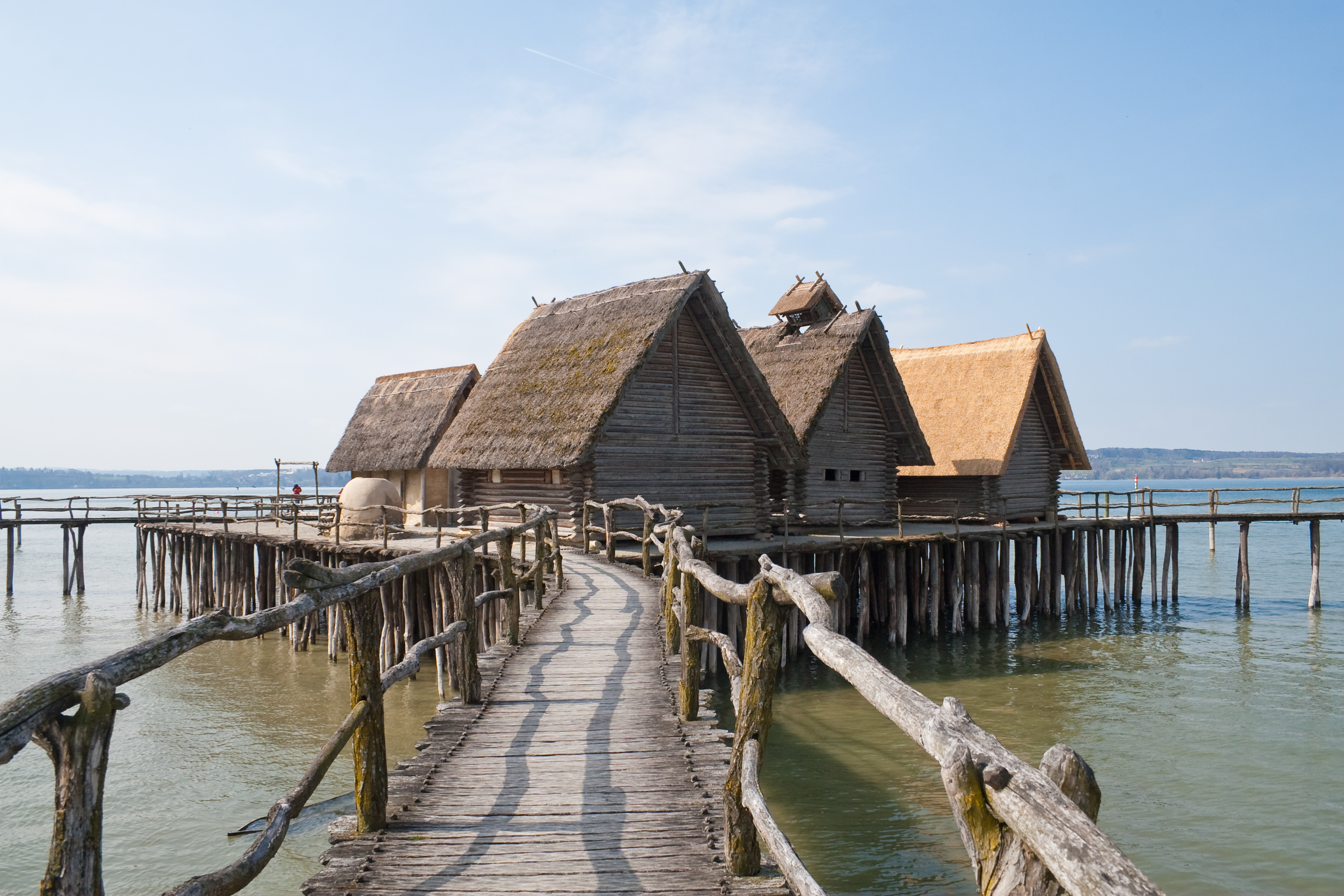
Bronze Age village reconstruction.

Is an idealistic reconstruction of late Bronze Age buildings on a platform, built between 1923 and 1931.

=== Bronze age village “Unteruhldingen” ===
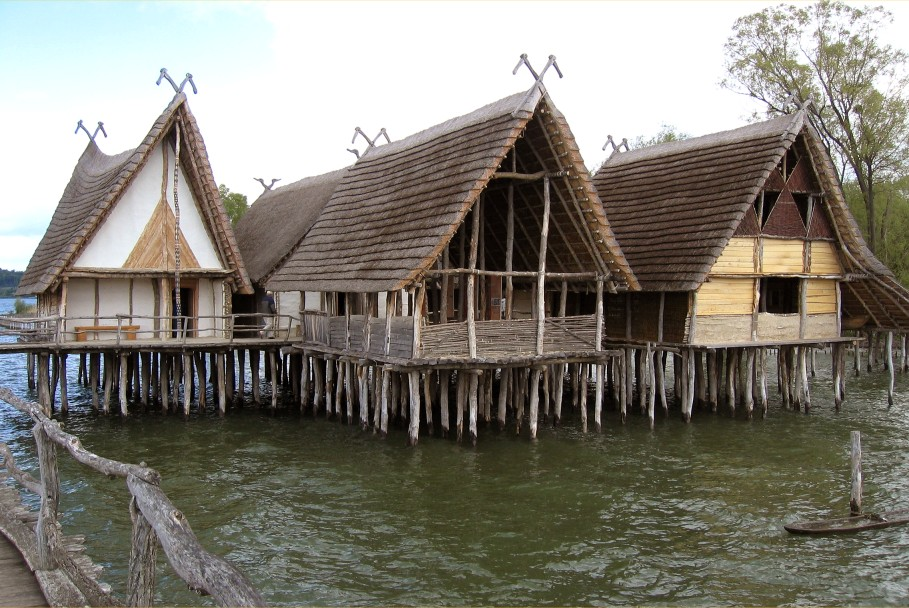
Bronze Age village reconstruction.

A number of dwellings built between 1999 and 2002.

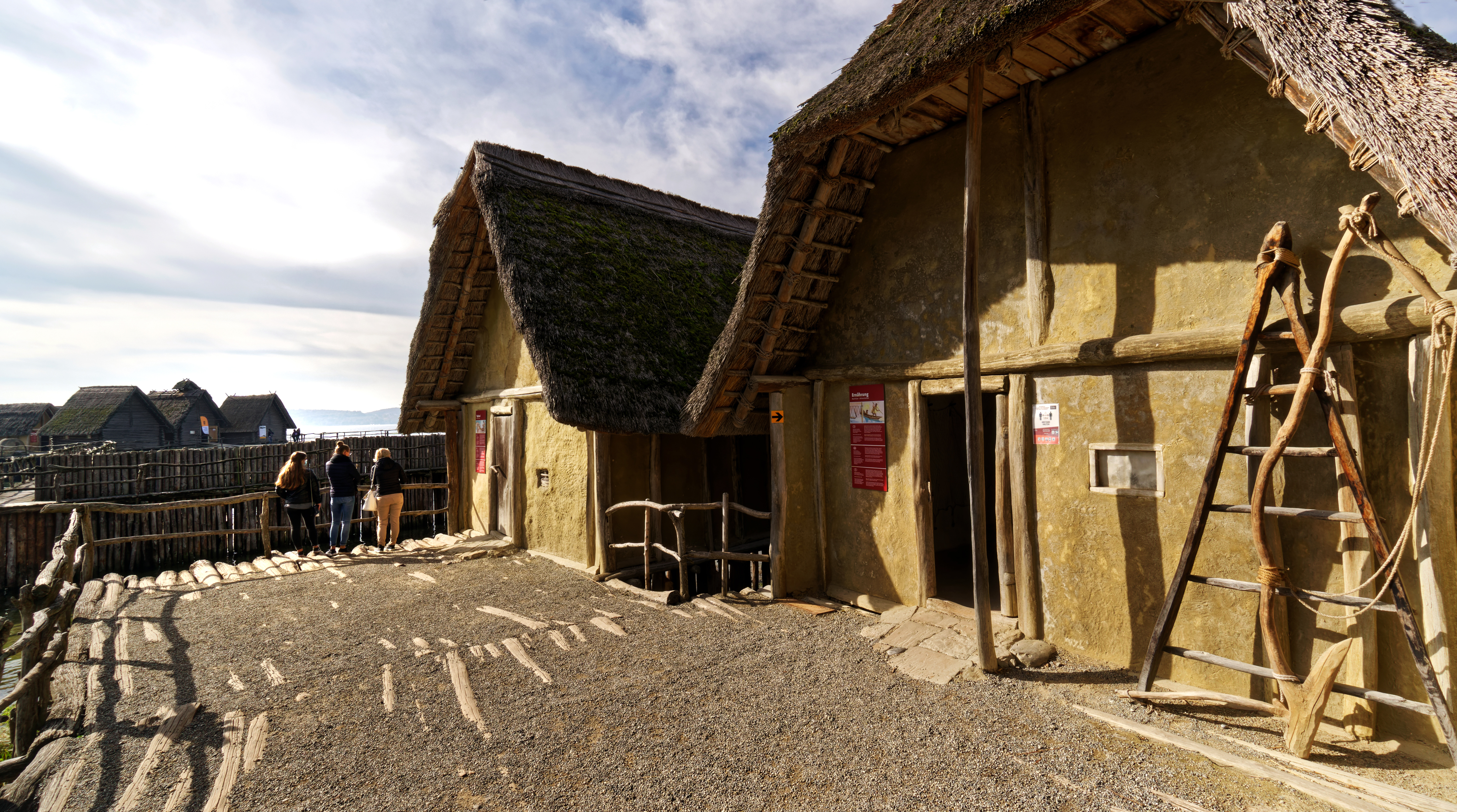

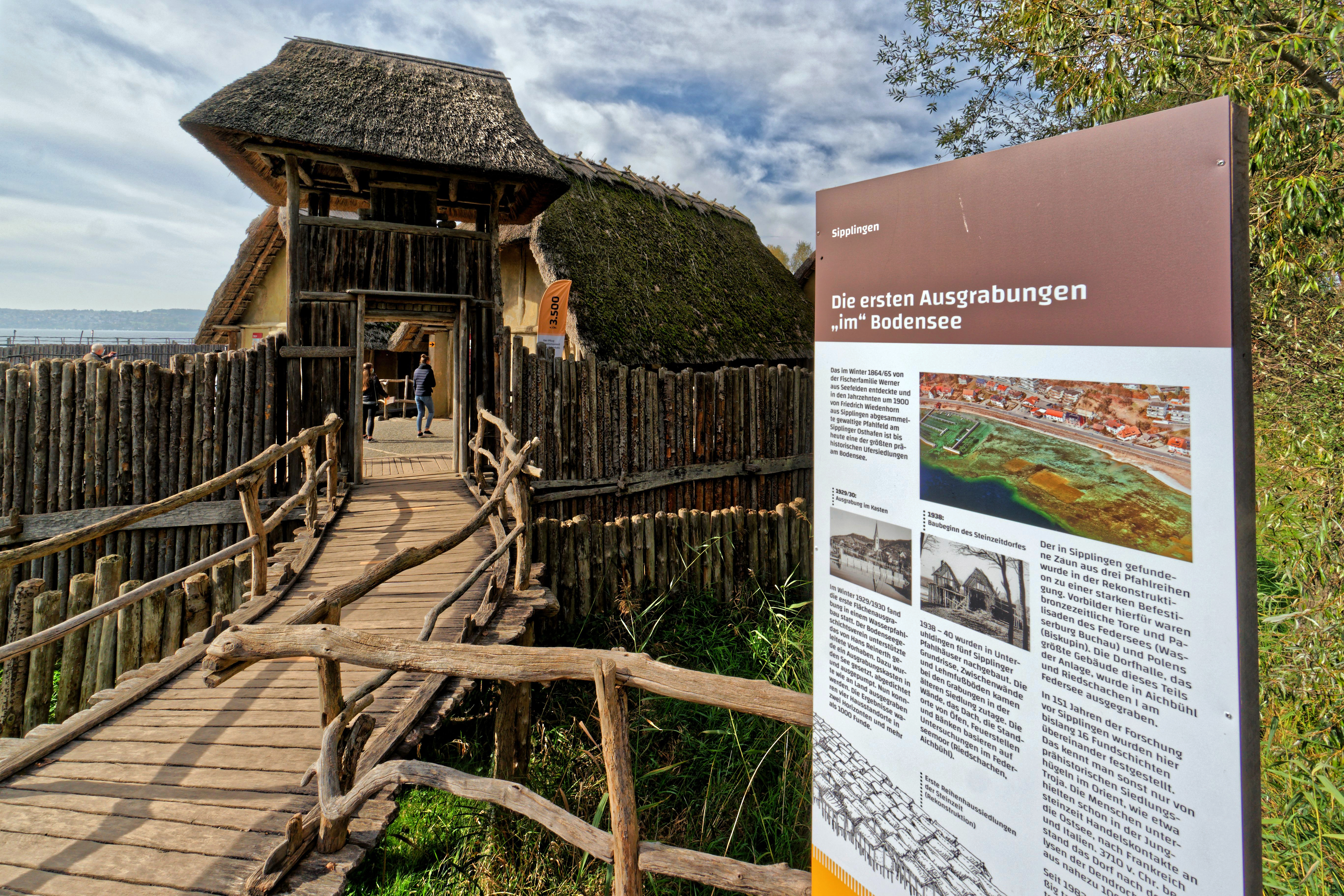

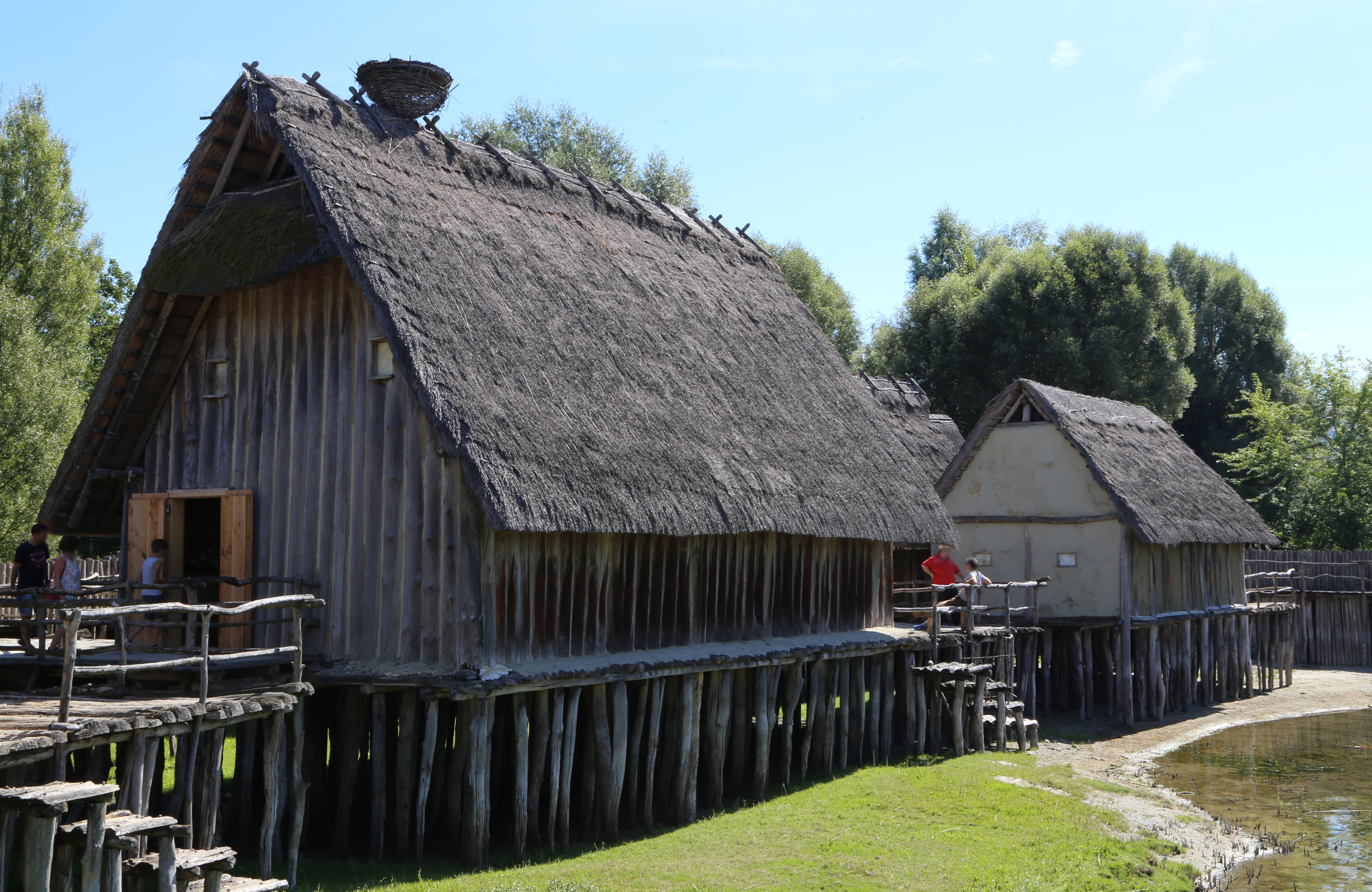

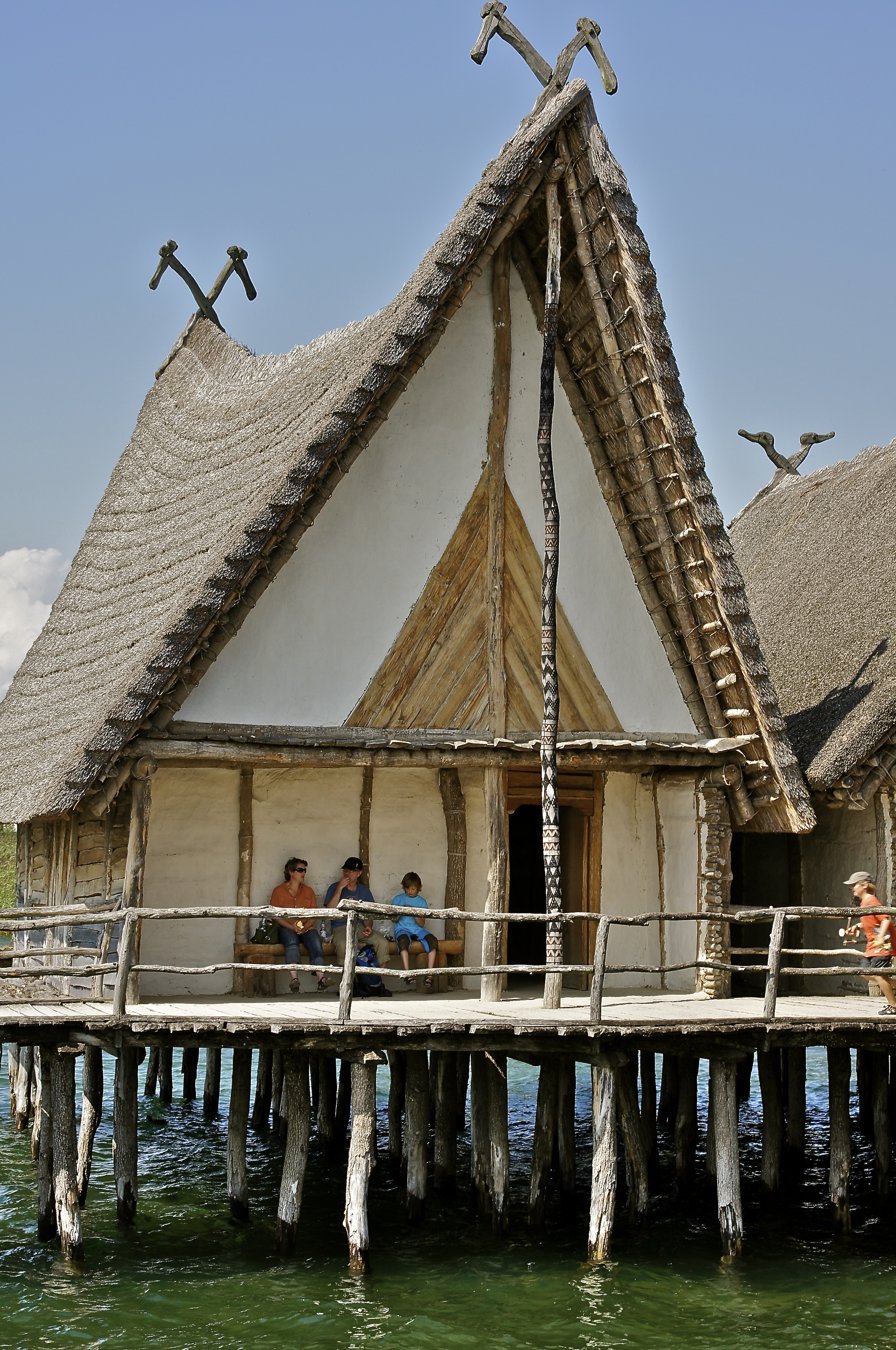

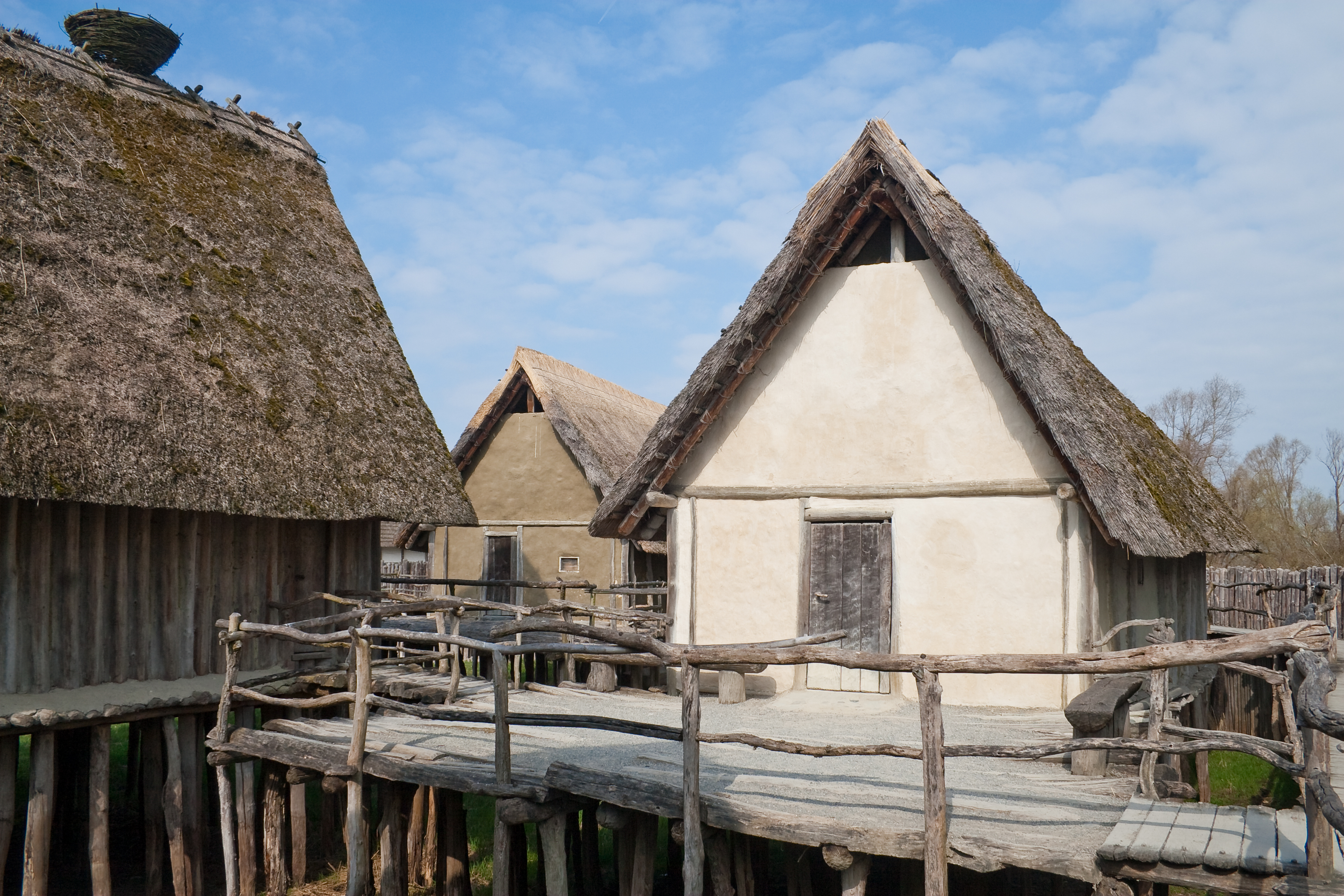

=== Stone age houses “Riedschachen/Schussenried” ===
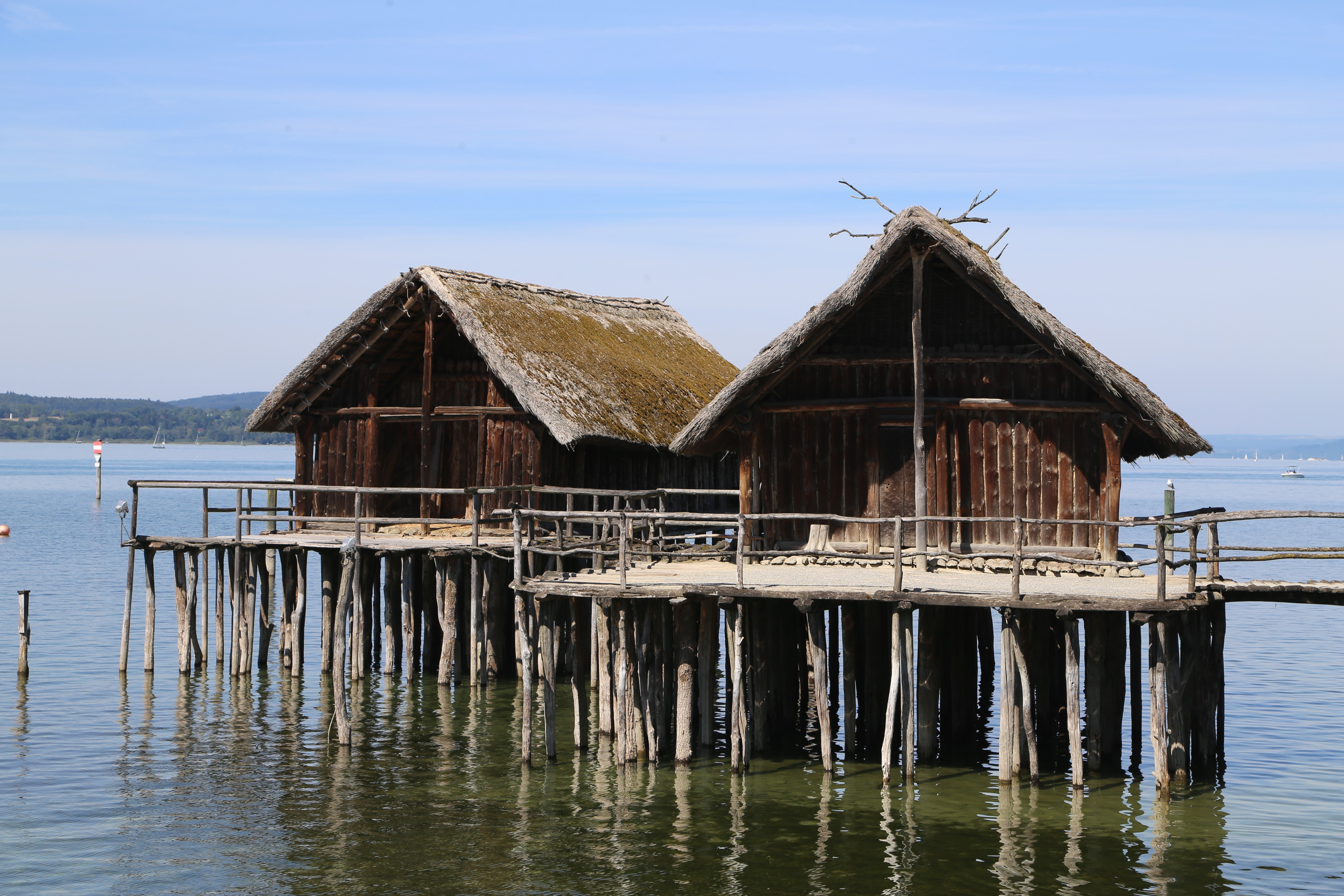
Neolithic houses “Riedschachen”

In 1922, the first two stilt houses were erected. They are based on archaeological excavations in a bog close to the Federsee near Bad Schussenried in 1920 where remains of a Neolithic settlement of 4000 BC were found.

=== SWR Stone Age village ===
Building moved to the site, originally used in the TV program “Steinzeit - Das Experiment. Leben wie vor 5000 Jahren”

=== Stone age village “Sipplingen” ===
Built between 1938 and 1940 based on early stone age stilt dwellings.

=== “Hornstaad-House” and “Arbon-House” ===
Stone age reconstructions built between 1996 and 1998.

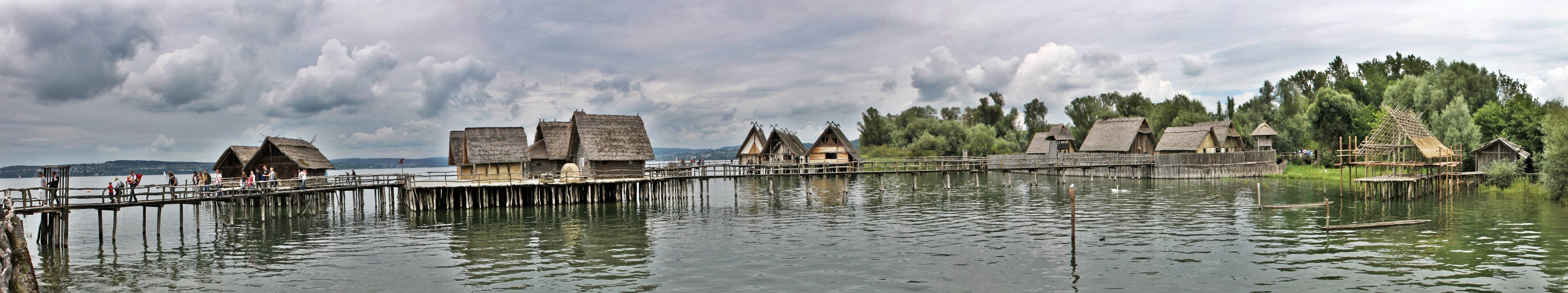
Panorama

== See also ==
- Prehistoric pile dwellings around the Alps
- Post in ground
- Neolithic Europe
- Bronze Age Europe
- Urnfield culture
