= Nazi archaeology =

Aryan-nationalist pseudoarchaeology of the Nazi Party and Ahnenerbe

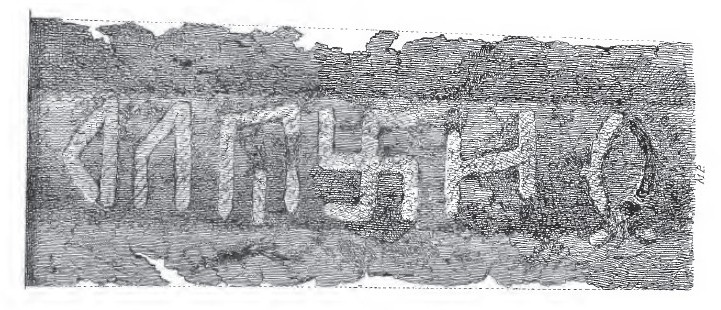
Nazi iconography drew on ideologically driven reconstructions of ancient cultures, including the swastika, seen here in an inscription on the 9th-century Sæbø sword

Nazi archaeology was a movement in pseudoarchaeology, directed and funded by leaders of Nazi Germany such as Adolf Hitler and Heinrich Himmler, that sought material evidence for a prehistoric Aryan master race in the archaeological record of Germany and Europe. Drawing on the ethnocentric theories of the philologist Gustaf Kossinna, its practitioners aimed to show that the Germanic peoples had created an advanced civilization responsible for the major achievements of Western culture.

The principal institutions of Nazi archaeology were the Ahnenerbe, founded in 1935 and controlled by Himmler's SS, and the rival Amt Rosenberg under the party ideologist Alfred Rosenberg. Backed by state funding, they organised excavations and expeditions in Germany and abroad and produced films, journals and open-air museums to promote a nationalistic view of the German past. Kossinna's Kulturkreis theory, which equated material culture with ethnicity, was used to justify German territorial claims to Poland, Czechoslovakia and other lands; after these territories were occupied, sites such as Biskupin were re-excavated and reinterpreted as Germanic.

Much of the work was carried out by scholars from outside archaeology and produced no credible evidence for its claims; sites such as the Externsteine yielded nothing to support the idea of an ancient Germanic sanctuary. Historians regard Nazi archaeology as a propaganda tool and a form of pseudoscience, and it is often cited as a case study in the political misuse of the discipline. Many of the archaeologists involved retained academic positions after the war, and a sustained reckoning with this history came only decades later.

== Overview ==
The search for an inspirational, nationalistic, Aryan-centric national prehistory of Germany began after the German Empire suffered defeat in World War I in 1918. Subsequently the country faced a severe economic crisis due to the terms of the 1919 Treaty of Versailles. One of the leading experts who engaged in research and study in German prehistory was German philologist and archaeologist Gustaf Kossinna (1858–1931), whose ideas were taken up by Nazi organisations such as the Amt Rosenberg (officially established in 1934) and the Ahnenerbe (founded in 1935). Researchers specialised in German prehistory, armed with funding from the Nazi Party for such studies; thus the Nazis were able to add pseudoarchaeology into their extensive propaganda campaigns directed at the German people. "According to Nazi doctrine, the Germanic culture of northern Europe was responsible for virtually all major intellectual and technological achievements of Western civilization."

Kossinna's approach, known as settlement archaeology (Siedlungsarchäologie), held that sharply defined archaeological cultures corresponded to particular peoples, so that the distribution of a distinctive material culture could be used to map the former territory of an ethnic group. On this basis he argued that any land where "Germanic" artefacts were found had once been Germanic soil, a claim set out in works such as Die deutsche Vorgeschichte, eine hervorragend nationale Wissenschaft (1912). After his death in 1931 this reasoning was taken up by Nazi ideologues, who presented prehistoric material as proof of Aryan superiority and as justification for territorial expansion.

== Tenets ==
1. The Kulturkreis ("culture circles") theory, originally by German ethnologists Fritz Graebner, but used in studies by Gustaf Kossinna, stated that recognition of an ethnic region is based on the material culture excavated from an archaeological site. This theory was used by the Nazis to justify takeover and occupation of foreign lands such as Poland and Czechoslovakia. One such example of Kulturkreis is shown in Kossinna's article "The German Ostmark", in which Kossinna argued that Poland should be a part of the German Reich, since any lands where an artifact was titled "Germanic" were therefore ancient Germanic territory, in which the artifacts had been "wrongfully stolen" by "barbarians".
2. The Social Diffusion Theory, which stated that cultural diffusion occurred through a process whereby influences, ideas and models were passed on by more advanced peoples to the less advanced whom they came into contact with. Examples offered by Kossinna and Alfred Rosenberg presented a history of Germany equivalent to that of the Roman Empire, suggesting that "Germanic people were never destroyers of culture—not like the Romans—and the French in recent times." Combined with Nazi ideology, this theory gave the perfect foundation for the view of Germany as the locomotive of world civilization.
3. Weltanschauungswissenschaften, or "world-view sciences", held that culture and science were one and carried certain "race-inherent values". The theory called for older cultural models such as sagas, stories and legends to be reincorporated into mainstream culture, arguing that "the guiding principle in Germany must be to emphasise the high cultural level and the cultural self-sufficiency of the Germanic people." It also held that the ideas and conclusions of German scientists were inherently more valid than those of "lesser-race" scientists, and was reflected in the use of Aryan regalia such as the swastika and of German legends and runic symbols in the SS.
4. Deutsche Reinheit ("pure German man") held that Germans were "pure Aryans" who had survived a natural catastrophe and developed a highly advanced culture during a long migration to Germany. It also claimed that the ancient Greeks were themselves Germanic, citing supposed "Indo-Germanic" artifacts found in Greece. The theory supported the Kulturkreis theory tangentially, allowing archaeologists who were uneasy with the uses of Kulturkreis theory to endorse it instead.
5. The Ahnenerbe and its own role as an organisation with the purpose of using its archaeological "findings" to further support the propaganda machine of the Nazi regime through the use of previously listed tenets presented and built on by German archaeologists such as Gustaf Kossinna.

== Organisations and operations ==
=== Ahnenerbe ===
The emblem of the Ahnenerbe

The Ahnenerbe Organisation, formally the Deutsches Ahnenerbe – Studiengesellschaft für Geistesurgeschichte (German Ancestry - Research Society for Ancient Intellectual History ) was an organisation, started as the Research Institute for the Prehistory of Mind, that was connected to the SS in 1935 by Walther Darré. In 1936, it was attached to Hitler's Reichsführer-SS and led by chief of police Heinrich Himmler. By 1937, it was the primary instrument of Nazi archaeology and archaeological propaganda, subsuming smaller organisations like Reinerth's Archaeology Group, and filling its ranks with "investigators". These included people like Herman Wirth, co-founder of the Ahnenerbe, who attempted to prove that Northern Europe was the cradle of Western civilization.

The main goals of the organisation were:

1. To study the territory, ideas and achievements of the Indo-Germanic people
2. To bring the research findings to life and present them to the German people
3. To encourage every German to get involved in the organisation.

Although the organisation claimed to have a research goal, Himmler had no official training in archaeology and was known for his interest in mysticism and the occult. Himmler defined the organisation as working towards a prehistory that would prove the pre-eminence of the Germans and their Germanic predecessors since the beginning of civilization. He is quoted as saying, "A nation lives happily in the present and the future so long as it is aware of its past and the greatness of its ancestors."

The Ahnenerbe had difficulty finding scientists to work on the projects and was run largely by scholars from branches of the humanities, which made their research both unskilled and less professional. The group went on to be responsible for pseudoarchaeology, illustrated by open-air displays honoring Germanic heritage such as the Externsteine, a sandstone formation that was thought to have been a key Germanic cult site. Another example is the Sachsenhain, where 4,500 Saxons were executed as a punishment for Widukind's uprising. This site was used as an idealised shrine that was considered sacred to the Germanic people and highlighting their readiness for self-sacrifice.

Although there were other sites researched by Ahnenerbe, many of them were censored from the public since they did not have the correct Germanic interpretations. The sites chosen for excavations were limited to those of Germanic superiority such as Erdenburg, where the Ahnenerbe claimed to have clear evidence of the victorious campaign of the Germani against the Romans.

Some of the Ahnenerbe's most extravagant activities include:

- Edmund Kiss tried to travel to Bolivia in 1928 to study the ruins of temples in the Andes mountains. He claimed their similarity to ancient European construction indicated they were designed by Nordic migrants that had arrived at the area millions of years earlier.
- In 1938, Franz Altheim and his research partner Erika Trautmann requested the Ahnenerbe sponsor their Middle East trek to study an internal power struggle of the Roman Empire, which they believed was fought between the Nordic and Semitic peoples.
- In 1936 an Ahnenerbe expedition visited the German island of Rügen and then Sweden, with the objective of examining rock-art which they concluded was "proto-Germanic".
- Nazi theorists took a huge interest in the Bayeux Tapestry, going so far as to attempt archaeological digs to find other contemporary artwork that would support their assertion of Germanic might.
- In 1938 the Ahnenerbe backed the German expedition to Tibet, led by Ernst Schäfer, on which the anthropologist Bruno Beger took skull and body measurements of some 376 people to compare Tibetan features with those associated with Aryans.

=== Amt Rosenberg ===
The Amt Rosenberg, headed by the party ideologist Alfred Rosenberg, promoted archaeology intended to demonstrate the superiority of Germanic culture. Rosenberg saw world history as a struggle between a Nordic race, which he traced to Atlantis, and the "Semites"; he held that only the Germanic peoples had brought culture to the world, and advocated a racial materialism in which only the Aryans should survive. His archaeological interests were pursued through the Reichsbund für deutsche Vorgeschichte (Reich Association for German Prehistory), which grew out of the older Society for German Prehistory and sought to bring the country's local prehistory societies under central control.

The Reichsbund was led by the archaeologist Hans Reinerth, whom Rosenberg appointed "Reich Deputy for German Prehistory" in 1934. The rivalry between Rosenberg's organisation and Himmler's Ahnenerbe dominated what little archaeological work the regime produced. Reinerth's combative style, which included public campaigns against established scholars such as Gero von Merhart, alienated many members, and archaeologists increasingly gravitated towards the better-funded and more prestigious Ahnenerbe. Control of the Externsteine was itself a front in the contest: Reinerth extended the Amt Rosenberg's influence over the antiquarian society in Lippe, which prompted Wilhelm Teudt to turn to Himmler for support.

== Goals ==
=== To the public ===
Nazi archaeology was rarely conducted with an eye to pure research but was instead used as a propaganda tool designed to generate nationalistic pride in the German people and provide scientific excuses for hostile takeovers. Nazi archaeology was rarely conducted for pure research and was instead used as a propaganda tool to generate nationalistic pride and provide justifications for territorial expansion. Lothar Zotz produced a series of films with titles such as Threatened by the Steam Plough, Germany's Bronze Age, The Flames of Prehistory and On the Trail of the Eastern Germans, which presented the supposed prehistory of the German peoples through myth and appeals to an ancient past. Because these periods were little known to the general public, the films could carry a heavy propaganda content.

Public journals such as Die Kunde (The Message) and Germanen-Erbe (Germanic Heritage) also appeared, offering readers interpretations of archaeological sites presented as the "true" German prehistory.

The Nazis also encouraged the public to get involved in the search for the past, using patriotism as a tool. For instance, the membership flyer of one amateur organisation of the Amt Rosenberg stated, "Responsibility with respect to our indigenous prehistory must again fill every German with pride!" The organisation's goal was also articulated as, "the interpretation and dissemination of unclassified knowledge regarding the history and cultural achievements of our northern Germanic ancestors on German and foreign soil."

In addition to appealing to public patriotism, open-air museums were established that reconstructed Neolithic and Bronze Age lake settlements at Unteruhldingen. These public museums gained immense popularity among the general public and encouraged people to believe in and search for their Germanic past.

All of these elements combined to create a strong foundation of Germanic pride among the German people, which was used to reinforce the nationalistic and fascist message that Adolf Hitler was crafting through his speeches, open-air meetings, and public image.

=== To archaeologists ===
Prior to the formation of the Ahnenerbe, there was little funding for or interest in Germanic archaeology. This allowed for the Nazi Party to easily rouse interest in the subject among the general public, which in turn made it easier to push their ethnocentric views onto the uninformed public. Another side effect of this sudden support was felt in some scholarly circles, since many German scholars who specialised in archaeology had long been envious of the advancements in archaeology their European neighbors had made during their excavations in the Middle East. With the sudden boom in interest, the scholars were finally able to put their knowledge to work.

Because of Hitler, many changes occurred; funds were made available for scholars to make great advancements beyond their neighboring countries. Under Nazi rule, archaeology went from having one chair in prehistory in Marburg in 1933 to having nine chairs in the Reich in 1935. Once archaeology started gaining popularity, scholars were able to partake in much grander projects, such as the excavation of castles, old ruins, and bring back pieces for display in museums.

One specific example of these changes was that the Römisch-Germanisches Zentralmuseum (Romano-Germanic Central Museum) in Mainz, which, in 1939, became for a time the Zentralmuseum für deutsche Vor- und Frühgeschichte (Central museum for German pre- and early history). (Note the difference between the original "Römisch-Germanisch" which denotes a historical period, and "deutsche", implying a continuous history of a united group of people. "Anglo-Saxon" and "English" would be rough analogies.)

In their enthusiasm for the Nazi regime's support of archaeology, many German archaeologists became pawns and puppets of the real goals behind the movement. They answered to the requests of the Ahnenerbe, and not always in the interests of true archaeology.

== Interest in Iceland ==
Iceland was of particular interest to the Ahnenerbe, which believed the island preserved an especially pure form of ancient Nordic culture. In 1938 the dialectologist Bruno Schweizer obtained Himmler's backing for an expedition to record traditional farming, architecture, folk songs and dances, and to search for shrines to Norse gods such as Thor and Odin. The Icelandic authorities restricted the project, and although the team identified a cave it claimed as an ancient place of worship (a hof), the site was shown to have been uninhabited before the 18th century. The expedition was rescheduled for the summer of 1940 but was shelved after the British occupation of Iceland in May 1940.

== Search for Atlantis ==
In their attempt to prove Aryan superiority, some Nazi researchers sought archaeological evidence for the lost island of Atlantis. The project was originally led by Herman Wirth and later taken over by Heinrich Himmler. Rejecting the common view that Atlantis had lain in the Mediterranean, Wirth placed it in the North Atlantic and held that it had been the home of a Nordic, or Aryan, civilization that reached its height some 25,000 years ago and was destined to rule mankind. His ideas gained a following among senior figures in Nazi Germany.

In 1935, Himmler joined with Wirth to establish the Ahnenerbe, a team of SS scholars assembled to search sacred sites for evidence that the Aryans of Atlantis were more than propaganda. A major excavation took place at the Externsteine, a sandstone formation near Detmold, overseen by the völkisch lay archaeologist Wilhelm Teudt, who had it excavated in the hope of showing that it had been an ancient Germanic sanctuary long before it became a Christian site. The excavations became a personal project of Himmler, but produced no evidence of pre-Christian ritual use.

=== Haus Atlantis ===
In the city of Bremen, Germany stands a unique example of German architecture designed by Bernhard Hoetger and inspired by a fascination with ideas by Herman Wirth that the lost city of Atlantis was originally inhabited by Germanics, thereby making Germans the oldest known race on earth. "Haus Atlantis" or "Atlantis House" was completed in 1931 and was designed with the sole purpose of studying Atlantis and its relation to the Aryan race. The façade of the building was originally adorned by a carved wooden feature depicting the Nordic God Odin (also referred to as "The Atlantis Survivor") crucified on the tree of life. It was destroyed by fire during WWII and was not recreated when the façade was rebuilt in 1954. The architectural masterpiece is composed mostly of glass and steel. Many historians believe that the choice of materials in combination with the interior architecture was intended to represent the Aryan exodus from Atlantis. At the top of the building is a room called "The Heaven's Hall", which served as a teaching forum for young Nazi archaeologists, where they were taught the theories of figures such as Herman Wirth and Hans Reinerth about a Germanic presence in Atlantis.

== Archaeology in occupied Europe ==
As German forces occupied much of Europe, the Ahnenerbe and allied bodies extended their work into the conquered territories, where prehistoric sites were reinterpreted to support claims of ancient Germanic settlement. The most prominent case was Biskupin, a fortified Iron Age lake settlement in western Poland that the Polish archaeologist Józef Kostrzewski had excavated from 1934 as evidence of an indigenous Lusatian culture. After the invasion of Poland in 1939, the site was taken over by the SS-Ahnenerbe, renamed Urstädt, and re-excavated under Hans Schleif in an attempt to present it as a settlement overrun by Germanic tribes; the reinterpretation was used to help justify German claims to the region. German prehistorians were also involved in the confiscation and removal of archaeological collections from occupied Poland.

== Notable figures ==
=== Gustaf Kossinna ===
The nationalistic theories of Gustaf Kossinna about the origins and racial superiority of Germanic peoples influenced many aspects of Nazi ideology and politics. He is also considered to be a precursor of Nazi archaeology. Kossinna was trained as a linguist at universities in Göttingen, Leipzig, Berlin, and Strasbourg, and eventually held the chair for Germanic Archaeology at the University of Berlin. He laid the groundwork for an ethnocentric German prehistory with one of his theories, the Kulturkreis theory, being the basis on which the main pillars of Nazi archaeology were founded. Kossinna also published books for a general audience which were useful tools to spread German propaganda and created archaeological expeditions that allowed the Nazis to use Kulturkreis theory as an excuse for territorial expansion. In one of his most popular books, Die deutsche Vorgeschichte — eine hervorragend nationale Wissenschaft (German Prehistory: a Pre-eminently National Discipline), Kossinna puts forward the idea of an Aryan race, the Germani, superior to all other peoples, and shows Germany as the key to an unwritten history. The book was used to inspire the German people into the beliefs of the Nazi Party regarding the origins and history of the German people, with the dedication in the beginning reading, "To the German people, as a building block in the reconstruction of the externally as well as internally disintegrated fatherland." Kossinna died in 1931, 13 months before Hitler seized power.

=== Alfred Rosenberg ===
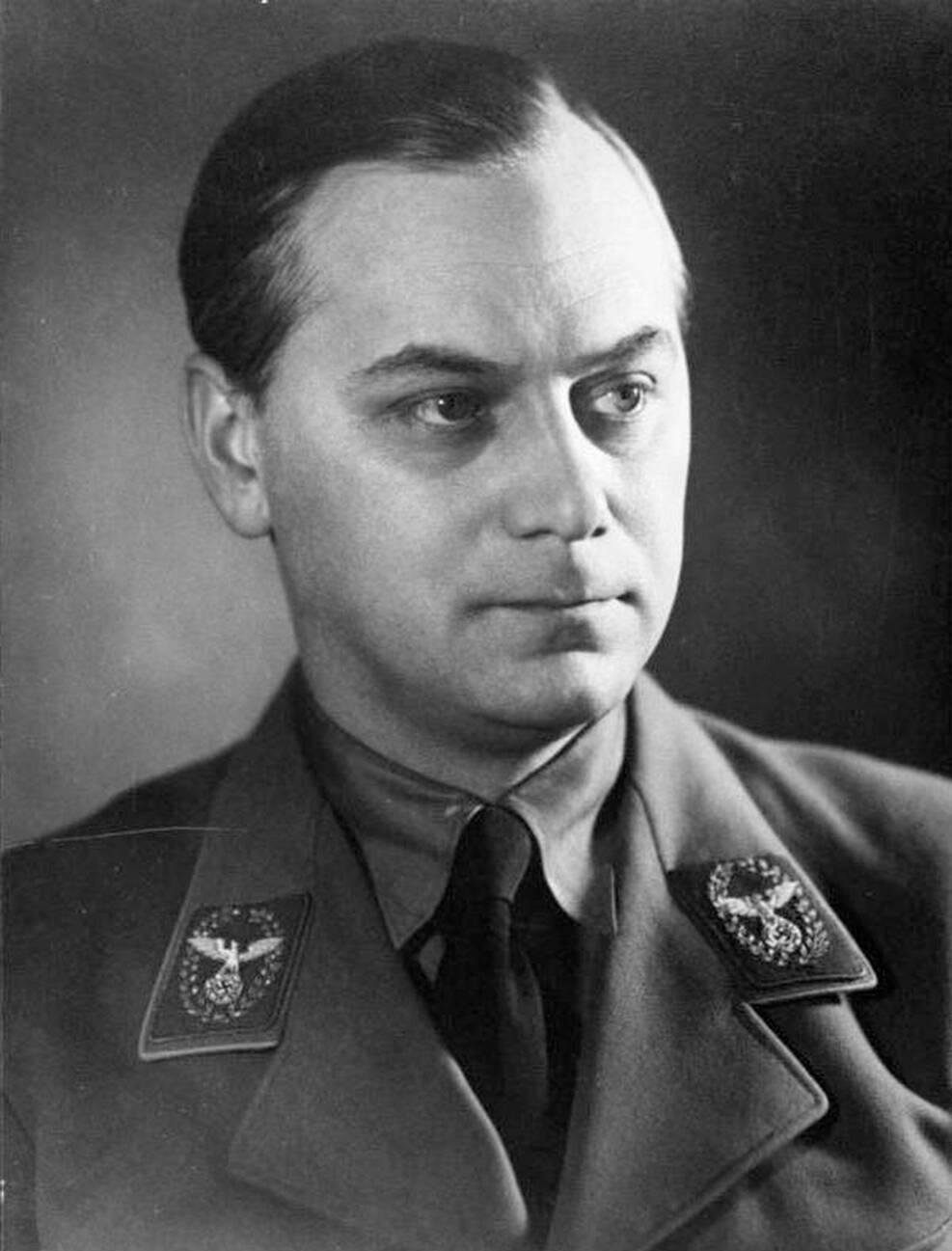
Alfred Rosenberg in 1939

Alfred Rosenberg was a Nazi Party ideologist who supported archaeological excavations and the study of provincial Roman Germany. He stated as a summary of his research and thoughts that "An individual to whom the tradition of his people and the honor of his people is not a supreme value, has forfeited the right to be protected by that people." Rosenberg's perspective on German prehistory led mainly to racist distortion of data which did not directly apply to the Germanic people. Rosenberg's book Der Mythos des 20. Jahrhunderts (The Myth of the Twentieth Century) gave support to the concept of a new Germanic religion. Rosenberg's theory, Weltanschauungswissenschaften, was implicit in the idea that Germany had the right to take over other nations - or even exterminate them - since German culture was "superior" to the culture of other groups. He also tried to prove that the Nordic-Aryans originated on a lost landmass identified with Atlantis, and that Jesus was not a Jew but instead an Aryan Amorite.

=== Hans Reinerth ===
Hans Reinerth was the main archaeologist Rosenberg worked with. Reinerth is famous for his excavations at the Federsee and he saw the Nazi Party as a tool he could use to work his way up in society. This is just what occurred, and in 1934 Rosenberg appointed him to the position of "Reich Deputy of German Prehistory". This made him the spokesman for the "purification and Germanisation of the German prehistory". Reinerth was an adherent of Hitler's theory of German racial purity. Though this theory never really came into full effect, Reinerth pushed it heavily as Reich Deputy, and encouraged archaeological exploration. His archaeological group, along with the Ahnenerbe organisation, was used to the Nazis' full advantage since it was a more "professional" group.

=== Herman Wirth ===
Herman Wirth was a Dutch-German historian who co-founded the SS organisation called Ahnenerbe before being pushed out of the organisation by Heinrich Himmler. Wirth began his career as a German soldier in 1914, when he volunteered for service in the German Army and monitored Flemish separatists in German-occupied Belgium. In 1917, after only two years of military service, he was decorated and dismissed from service. He was later appointed as a professor and researcher by Wilhelm II and remained in the position until the fall of the Third Reich. Wirth believed that civilization was an affliction that could only be cured by a simpler way of life. Later in life, during the reign of the Third Reich, Wirth was the primary proponent for the idea that the German people descended from Atlantis, more specifically that they descended from Aryan Atlanteans who made a mass exodus from Atlantis at some point. While Wirth was a Nazi archaeologist, unlike others who worked with the Nazi Party, he was not well-liked by most of the Nazi Party and received criticism from such intellectuals as Bolko von Richthofen, Arthur Hübner, and even Hitler himself, who denounced the Haus Atlantis institute in Bremen's Böttcherstraße in a 1936 speech at the Reichsparteitag. As a result, Wirth was widely regarded as a crank within the Nazi Party. In a 1979 interview with the Chilean neo-Nazi Miguel Serrano, Wirth claimed that his magnum opus, the Palestinabuch, had been stolen; there is little evidence that the book was ever completed. Wirth died in 1981 in Kusel, Germany.

=== Others ===
- Erika Trautmann
- Yrjö von Grönhagen
- Assien Bohmers
- Hans-Jürgen Eggers
- Herbert Jankuhn
- Gero von Merhart
- Gotthard Neumann
- Gustav Schwantes
- Ernst Sprockhoff
- Ernst Wahle
- Wilhelm Unverzagt
- Joachim Werner
- Hans Zeiß
- Werner Radig
- Albert Funk
- Ludwig Kohl-Larsen
- Gustav Riek

== Legacy ==
Nazi archaeology produced no credible evidence for its central claims and is regarded by historians as pseudoscience and propaganda rather than research. Even within the regime its standing was mixed: Adolf Hitler privately disparaged Himmler's excavations, complaining that drawing attention to a prehistoric past of "mud huts" only advertised that Germans "were still throwing stone hatchets and crouching around open fires when Greece and Rome had already reached the highest stage of culture".

After the war, many archaeologists who had prospered under National Socialism kept or regained academic positions in both West and East Germany, and a sustained reckoning with the discipline's Nazi past was largely delayed until the 1980s and 1990s. Kossinna's ethnic interpretation of material culture was widely discredited by its association with Nazism, and the equation of archaeological cultures with peoples came to be treated with lasting caution. Nazi archaeology is now frequently cited as a cautionary example of the political misuse of the past.

== See also ==
- Nationalism and archaeology
- List of topics characterized as pseudoscience
