= Sovereign Mercia =

- Merged into: Frisian Alliance
- Formation: 2008
- Dissolved: 2019
- Type: Activism, Neopaganism
- Region served: English Midlands
- Website: sovereignmercia.webs.com

Sovereign Mercia was an organisation that campaigned to establish a sovereign Mercian state in the English Midlands, and generally promoted the culture and identity of the region. Sovereign Mercia suggested a flag with the Wild Boar of Penda wearing a three pronged crown as the Mercian national flag, and proposed Life is a Beautiful Book (Stephanie de Sykes, 1974) as the Mercian national anthem, since it was used as the ATV Midlands start-up theme and therefore has a strong regional association.

== Overview ==
Sovereign Mercia was founded in Birmingham in 2008, having previously been the Midlands branch of the Ordo Anno Mundi, established in 1985 with the aim of promoting Anglo-Saxon paganism, taking its inspiration from texts such as the Prose Edda and Oera Linda Book, a 19th century hoax. It was also involved in the campaign for access to ancient sacred sites, such as stone circles, following the Battle of the Beanfield at Stonehenge. Like its predecessor, Sovereign Mercia initially held its annual conference during the Abbots Bromley Horn Dance each September in Staffordshire, and from 2015 at the Middle Earth Festival, Sarehole Mill, Birmingham. Its policies included the establishment of a legislature chosen by lot (sortition), an annually elected head of government, and a Pagan religious order of priestesses to serve as the judiciary and provide the head of state. Birmingham, the largest city in the Midlands, and located at the centre of its transport network, was proposed as the Mercian capital, and was the venue for Pagan & Magical Birmingham, Sovereign Mercia's weekly public moots (meetings), and other events.

The following 22 historic counties of England were recognised by Sovereign Mercia as constituting Mercia: Bedfordshire, Buckinghamshire, Cambridgeshire, Cheshire, Derbyshire, Gloucestershire, Herefordshire, Hertfordshire, Holland, Huntingdonshire, Isle of Ely, Kesteven, Leicestershire, Lindsey, Lincolnshire, Northamptonshire, Nottinghamshire, Oxfordshire, Rutland, Shropshire, Staffordshire, Warwickshire and Worcestershire.
