= Arthur Hübner =

German philologist

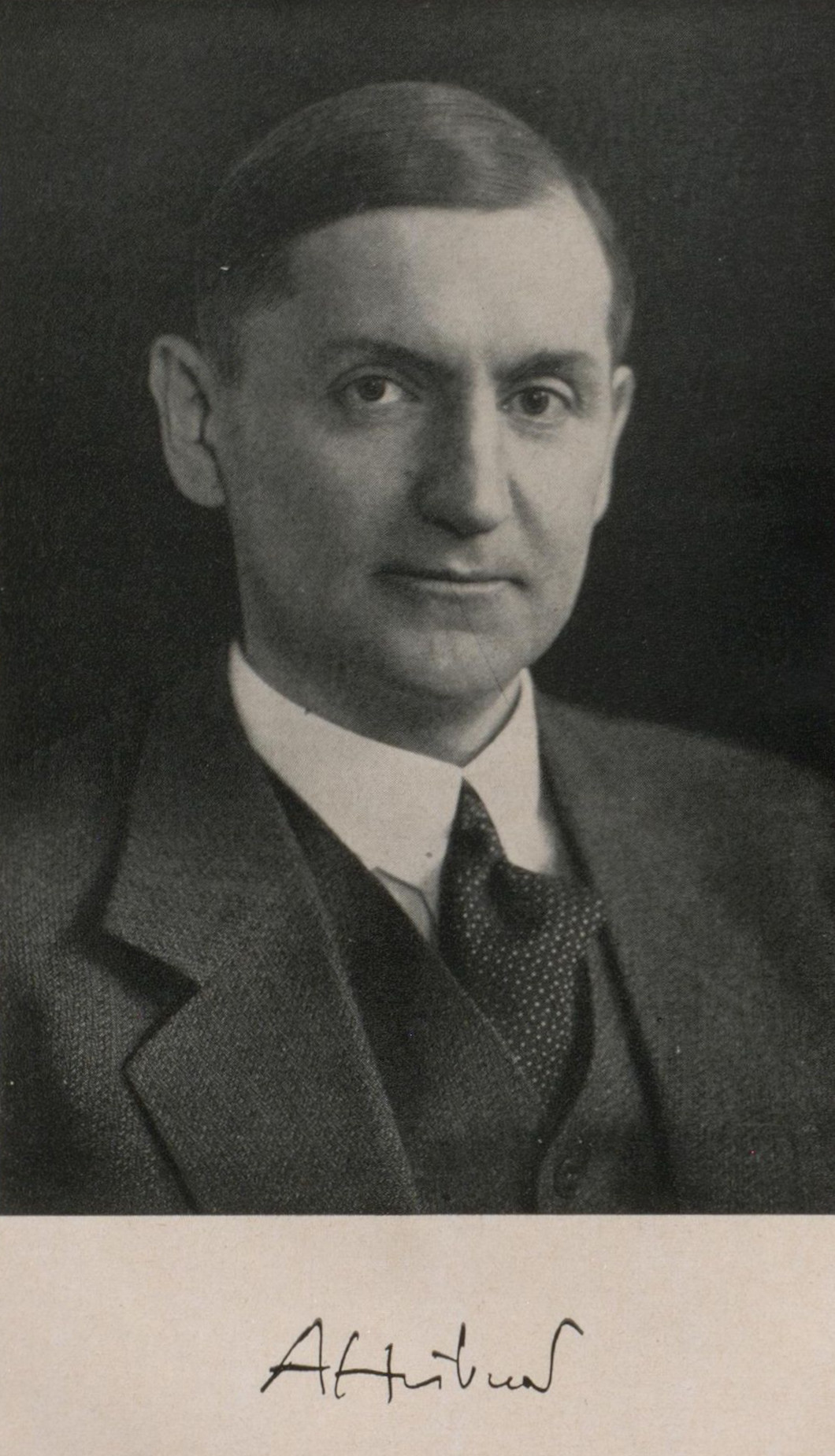
Arthur Hübner

Arthur Hübner (17 September 1885, Neudamm – 9 March 1937, Berlin) was a German philologist. He specialized in research of German literature from the Middle Ages (folk songs and folk tales, study of dialects, etc.).

From 1904 to 1909, he studied classical and German philology at the Universities of Graz and Berlin, where he was influenced by the work of Germanist Gustav Roethe. In 1918 he became an associate professor in Berlin, later relocating to Münster as a full professor of medieval Germanic studies (1924). In 1927 he succeeded Roethe as professor at the University of Berlin.

In 1932 he became a member of the Prussian Academy of Sciences. In 1932–1937, along with Edward Schröder, he was editor of the "Zeitschrift für deutsches Altertum und deutsche Literatur".

== Selected works ==
- Daniel, eine Deutschordensdichtung. 1910 – Daniel; German religious poetry.
- Die poetische bearbeitung des Buches Daniel, 1911 – Poetic editing of the book of Daniel
- Die Mundart der Heimat, 1925 – The dialect of the Heimat.
- Die deutschen Geisslerlieder; Studien zum geistlichen Volksliede des Mittelalters, 1931 – The German Geisslerlieder; Studies of sacred folk songs of the Middle Ages.
- Herman Wirth und die Ura-Linda-chronik, 1934 – Herman Wirth and the Ura-Linda Chronicle.
- Frühe deutsche Lyrik, 1935 (with Hans Arens) – Early German poetry.
- Kleine Schriften zur deutschen Philologie, 1940 – Smaller writings of German philology.
