= Cultural diffusion =

Archaeological theory

In cultural anthropology and cultural geography, cultural diffusion is the spreading of cultural items—such as ideas, styles, art, religions, technologies, languages—between individuals, whether within a single culture or from one culture to another. The concept was introduced by Leo Frobenius in his 1897/98 publication Der westafrikanische Kulturkreis. It is distinct from the diffusion of innovations within a specific culture. Examples of cultural diffusion include the spread of the war chariot and of iron smelting in ancient times, and the use of automobiles and Western business suits in the 20th century.

== Types ==
Five major types of cultural diffusion have been defined:

- Expansion diffusion: an innovation or idea that develops in a source area and remains strong there, while also spreading outward to other areas. This can include hierarchical, stimulus, and contagious diffusion.
- Relocation diffusion: an idea or innovation that migrates into new areas, leaving behind its origin or source of the cultural trait.
- Hierarchical diffusion: an idea or innovation that spreads by moving from larger to smaller places, often with little regard to the distance between places, and often influenced by social elites.
- Contagious diffusion: an idea or innovation that spreads based on person-to-person contact within a given population with no regard for hierarchies. HIV/AIDS first spread to urban neighborhoods (Hierarchical diffusion) and then spread outwards (contagious diffusion)
- Stimulus diffusion: an idea or innovation that spreads based on its attachment to another concept. Occurs when a certain idea is rejected but the underlying concept is adopted. Early Siberian people domesticated reindeer only after exposure to the domesticated cattle raised by cultures to their south. They had no use for cattle but the idea of domesticated herds appealed to them, and they began domesticating reindeer, an animal they had long hunted.

== Mechanisms ==
Inter-cultural diffusion can happen in many ways. Migrating populations will carry their culture with them. Ideas can be carried by trans-cultural visitors, such as merchants, explorers, soldiers, diplomats, enslaved people, and hired artisans. Technology diffusion has often occurred by one society luring skilled scientists or workers by payments or another inducement. Trans-cultural marriages between two neighboring or interspersed cultures have also contributed. Among literate societies, diffusion can occur through letters, books, and, in modern times, through electronic media.

There are three categories of diffusion mechanisms:

- Direct diffusion occurs when two cultures are very close to each other, resulting in intermarriage, trade, and even warfare. An example of direct diffusion is between the United States and Canada, where the people living on the border of these two countries engage in hockey, which started in Canada, and baseball, which is popular in American culture.
- Forced diffusion occurs when one culture subjugates (conquers or enslaves) another culture and forces its own customs on the conquered people. An example would be the forced Christianization of the indigenous peoples of the Americas by the Spanish, French, English, and Portuguese, or the forced Islamization of West African peoples by the Fula or of the Nuristanis by the Afghans.
- Indirect diffusion happens when traits are passed from one culture through a middleperson to another culture, without the first and final cultures being in direct contact. An example could be the presence of Mexican food in Canada since a large territory (the United States) lies between.

Direct diffusion was common in ancient times when small groups of humans lived in adjoining settlements. Indirect diffusion is common in today's world because of the mass media and the invention of the Internet. Also of interest is the work of American historian and critic Daniel J. Boorstin in his book The Discoverers, in which he provides a historical perspective on the role of explorers in the diffusion of innovations between civilizations.

== Theories ==
The many models that have been proposed for inter-cultural diffusion are:

- Migrationism, the spread of cultural ideas by either gradual or sudden population movements
- Culture circles diffusionism (Kulturkreise)—the theory that cultures originated from a small number of cultures
- "Kulturkugel" (a German compound meaning "culture bullet", coined by J. P. Mallory), a mechanism suggested by Mallory to model the scale of invasion vs. gradual migration vs. diffusion. According to this model, local continuity of material culture and social organization is stronger than linguistic continuity, so that cultural contact or limited migration regularly leads to linguistic changes without affecting material culture or social organization.
- Hyperdiffusionism—the theory that all cultures originated from one culture

A concept that has often been mentioned in this regard, which may be framed in the evolutionary diffusionism model, is that of "an idea whose time has come"—whereby a new cultural item appears almost simultaneously and independently in several widely separated places, after certain prerequisite items have diffused across the respective communities. This concept was invoked with regard to the independent development of calculus by Newton and Leibnitz, and the inventions of the airplane and of the electronic computer.

== Hyperdiffusionism ==
Hyperdiffusionists deny that parallel evolution or independent invention took place to any great extent throughout history; they claim that all major inventions and all cultures can be traced back to a single culture.

Early theories of hyperdiffusionism can be traced to ideas about South America being the origin of mankind. Antonio de León Pinelo, a Spaniard who settled in Bolivia, claimed in his book Paraíso en el Nuevo Mundo that the Garden of Eden and the creation of man had occurred in present-day Bolivia and that the rest of the world was populated by migrations from there. Similar ideas were also held by Emeterio Villamil de Rada; in his book La Lengua de Adán he attempted to prove that Aymara was the original language of mankind and that humanity had originated in Sorata in the Bolivian Andes. The first scientific defence of humanity originating in South America came from the Argentine paleontologist Florentino Ameghino in 1880, who published his research in La antigüedad del hombre en el Plata.

The work of Grafton Elliot Smith fomented a revival of hyperdiffusionism in 1911; he asserted that copper–producing knowledge spread from Egypt to the rest of the world along with megalithic culture. Smith claimed that all major inventions had been made by the ancient Egyptians and were carried to the rest of the world by migrants and voyagers. His views became known as "Egyptocentric-Hyperdiffusionism". William James Perry elaborated on Smith's hypothesis by using ethnographic data. Another hyperdiffusionist was Lord Raglan; in his book How Came Civilization (1939) he wrote that instead of Egypt all culture and civilization had come from Mesopotamia. Hyperdiffusionism after this did not entirely disappear, but it was generally abandoned by mainstream academia.

== Medieval Europe ==
Diffusion theory has been advanced as an explanation for the "European miracle", the adoption of technological innovation in medieval Europe which by the 19th century culminated in European technological achievement surpassing the Islamic world and China. Technological imports to medieval Europe include gunpowder, clock mechanisms, shipbuilding, paper, and the windmill; however, in each of these cases, Europeans not only adopted the technologies but improved the manufacturing scale, inherent technology, and applications to a point clearly surpassing the evolution of the original invention in its country of origin.

There are also some historians who have questioned whether Europe really owes the development of such inventions as gunpowder, the compass, the windmill or printing to the Chinese or other cultures.

However, historian Peter Frankopan argues that influences, particularly trade, through the Middle East and Central Asia to China through the silk roads have been overlooked in traditional histories of the "rise of the West". He argues that the Renaissance was funded with trade with the east (due to the demise of Byzantium at the hands of Venice and the Fourth Crusade), and that the trade allowed ideas and technology to be shared with Europe. But the constant warfare and rivalry in Europe meant there was extreme evolutionary pressure for developing these ideas for military and economic advantage, and a desperate need to use them in expansion.

== Disputes ==
While the concept of diffusion is well accepted in general, conjectures about the existence or the extent of diffusion in some specific contexts have been hotly disputed. An example of such disputes is the proposal by Thor Heyerdahl that similarities between the culture of Polynesia and the pre-Columbian civilizations of the Andes are due to diffusion from the latter to the former—a theory that currently has few supporters among professional anthropologists.

== Contributors ==
Major contributors to inter-cultural diffusion research and theory include:

- Franz Boas
- Anne Walbank Buckland
- James Burnett, Lord Monboddo
- Leo Frobenius
- Cyrus H. Gordon
- Fritz Graebner
- A. C. Haddon
- Alice Beck Kehoe
- David H. Kelley
- A. L. Kroeber
- W. J. Perry
- Friedrich Ratzel
- W. H. R. Rivers
- Everett Rogers
- Wilhelm Schmidt
- Grafton Elliot Smith
- E. B. Tylor
- Clark Wissler
- Thomas Friedman

== See also ==
- Cultural appropriation
- Demic diffusion
- Diffusion of innovations
- Meme
- Pre-Columbian trans-oceanic contact
