= Gero von Merhart =

German archaeologist

Gero Merhart von Bernegg (17 October 1886 in Bregenz – 4 March 1959 in Kreuzlingen) was an Austrian archaeologist. Although he worked at the same time when German nationalism and Nazi archaeology was dominant in Germany, he was not a "Nazi archaeologist". He came into conflict with Hans Reinerth who exploited his position to get the Nazi government to essentially fire Merhart from the tenured position he held at the University of Marburg in 1938.

He supervised Ph.D. dissertations in archaeology successfully defended by Kurt Bittel, and Joachim Werner, among a number of other scholars.

He died in Switzerland at the age of 72 on March 4, 1959.
