= Joachim Werner (archaeologist) =

German archaeologist

Joachim Werner (23 December 1909, Berlin – 9 January 1994, Munich) was a German archaeologist who was especially concerned with the archaeology of the Early Middle Ages in Germany. The majority of German professorships with particular focus on the field of the Early Middle Ages were in the second half of the 20th century (and also partly in the generation following that) occupied by his academic pupils.

== Life ==
Werner was born in Berlin, where he took his school finishing examinations at the French High-School, and in 1928 he began his specialist study of Prehistory and Early History, Classical Archaeology and both ancient and middle History. Among his teachers were (among others) Max Ebert and Wilhelm Unverzagt in Berlin, Oswald Menghin in Vienna and Gero von Merhart in Marburg. At Marburg University, he obtained his doctorate on 7 December 1932 with the dissertation Münzdatierte austrasische Grabfunde (Coin-Dated Grave Goods from Austrasia), which under the guidance of Hans Zeiss undertook the project to develop an absolute chronology of the Merovingian period based upon graves which contained (datable) coins. Although it has often had to be revised since then, this work was nevertheless a milestone in the knowledge of the Early Middle Ages.

After the Machtergreifung (Takeover of Power) in 1933, he joined the Nazi Party and the Sturmabteilung, to deflect attention from the fact that his father and grandparents were members of the Romani people.

His appointments and occupations included:

- 1933–1934: Travelling Scholarship with the German Archaeological Institute.
- 1935–1942: Roman-Germanic Commission of the German Archaeological Institute (Participant in the Sadovec excavations).
- 1938: Inauguration as an academic lecturer at the University of Frankfurt, with The Ornamented Discs from the Thorsberg Peat-bog Discovery. A Contribution to the History of Early Germanic Art and Religion, under Hans Zeiss.
- 1939–1945: various calls-up to the Wehrmacht.
- 1942: Professor for Prehistory and Early History at the Straßburg Reichs-University.
- 1945: Military internment in Switzerland, while completing his work on the Alamannic cemetery at Bülach.
- 1946–1947: Deputizing in the academic chair at the Ludwig-Maximilians-Universität München in the absence of Hans Zeiss.
- 1948–1974: Professor at the Ludwig-Maximilians-Universität München.
- 1953: Election to formal membership of the Historical Philosophy Class of the Bavarian Academy of Sciences.
- 1990: He received the title of Honorary Doctorate of the Jagiellonian University in Kraków, Poland.

His scientific interests included pre-Roman Iron Age and Germanic ethnic origins, late antique fortresses, Merovingian-age cemeteries and richly-furnished graves, Early Medieval Horse Peoples and the art of the Carolingian era. To these he added further similar researches into wealthy graves in South Korea.

From Munich, he was able to lead countless excavation projects, above all in Late Roman fortifications:

- Epfach, 1953–57
- Goldberg bei Türkheim, 1958–61
- Kastell Isny, 1966–70
- Münsterberg Breisach
- Kastell Sponeck bei Jechtingen
- Kellmünz 1986–1993

Additional excavation projects took place in Austria, Italy and Slovenia: Kuchl, Invillino in Friaul, Hrusica und Vranje. The Organizational structure for these excavations was mainly the Commission for archaeological research into late Roman Rhaetia, founded by Werner, at the Bavarian Academy of Sciences.

In the publication of the Cemetery of Mindelheim Werner worked up a chronological typology of belt-buckles, which was later modified by his pupil Rainer Christlein with reference to the cemetery of Marktoberdorf (Market Oberdorf). This remains even now an essential foundation for the chronology of the Merovingian age.

Werner supervised the doctorates of 33 students (including Bernhard Overbeck, Hans-Jörg Kellner and Hayo Vierck) and the inauguration as lecturers of seven colleagues, namely Vladimir Milojčić, Georg Kossack, Hermann Müller-Karpe, Günter Ulbert, Walter Torbrügge, H. Schubart und Volker Bierbrauer.

Werner died in Munich.

== Publications (selected) ==
- Münzdatierte Austrasische Grabfunde (Coin-Dated Austrasian Grave-Finds): Germanische Denkmaler Völkerwanderungszeit 3 (Berlin, Leipzig 1935)
- 'Die Bedeutung des Städtewesens für die Kulturentwicklung des frühen Keltentums', Die Welt als Geschichte 5, 1939, pp. 380–390.
- 'Das alamannische Fürstengrab von Wittislingen', Münchner Beitrage für Vor- und Frühgeschichte 2 (Munich 1940)
- Der Fund von Ittenheim. Ein alamannisches Fürstengrab des 7. Jahrhunderts im Elsass (Strassburg 1943)
- 'Zur Herkunft der frühmittelalterlichen Spangenhelme', Praehistorische Zeitschrift 34-35, 1949–50, pp. 178–193.
- 'Zur Entstehung der Reihengräberzivilisation. Ein Beitrag zur Methode der frühgeschichtlichen Archäologie', Archaeologia geographica 1, 1950, pp. 23–32.
- with S. Fuchs, Langobardische Fibeln aus Italien (Berlin 1950)
- Das alamannische Gräberfeld von Bülach. Monographs in Ur- und Frühgeschichte Schweiz (Basel 1953).
- Waage und Geld in der Merowingerzeit, Sitzungsbereich of the Bavarian Academy of Sciences (München 1954).
- Das alamannische Gräberfeld von Mindelheim, Materialheft Bayerischer Vorgeschichte 6 (Kallmünz/Opf. 1955).
- Beiträge zur Archäologie des Attila-Reiches, Abhandlung Bavarian Academy of Sciences, Philosophische-Historische Klasse 38A (München 1956).
- 'Frühkarolingische Silber-ohrringe von Rastede (Oldenburg): Beiträge zur Tierornamentik des Thassilokelches und verwandter Denkmäler', Germania 37, 1959, pp. 179–192.
- 'Fernhandel und Naturalwirtschaft im östlichen Merowingerreich nach archäologischen und numismatischen Zeugnissen', (Berichte der RGK 42, 1961), pp. 307–346.
- 'Herkuleskeulen und Donar-Amulett', Jahrbuch des Römisch-Germanischen Zentralmuseums Mainz 11, 1964, pp. 176 ff.
- 'Zu den alamannischen Burgen des 4. und 5. Jahrhunderts', Speculum Historiale. Festschrift for J. Spörl (Freiburg/Br., München 1965), pp. 439–453.
- 'Die kaiserzeitliche Siedlung Nauen-Bärhorst und das Problem der frühmittelalterlichen Dörfer', in Zur Geschichte und Volkskunde Mitteldeutschlands: Festschrift for F.v.Zahn (1968), pp. 347–352.
- 'Bemerkungen zur mitteldeutschen Skelettgräbergruppe Haßleben-Leuna', in H. Beumann (Ed.), Historische Forschungen für Walter Schlesinger (Köln, Wien 1974), p. 1 ff.
- 'Archäologische Bemerkungen zu den dendrochronologischen Befunden von Oberflacht', Fundberichte aus Baden-Württemberg 1 (1974), pp. 650–657.
- 'Die Ausgrabungen in St. Ulrich und Afra in Augsburg 1961–1968', Münchner Beitrage Vor- uund Frühgeschichte 28 (München 1977).
- Spätes Keltentum zwischen Rom und Germanien (München 1979).
- 'Der goldene Armring des Frankenkönigs Childerich', Frühmittelalterliche Studien 14, 1980, 1-49.
- 'Die Schwerter von Imola, Herbrechtingen und Endrebacke' (Studien zu mitteleuropäischen und skandinavischen Metallarbeiten aus der ersten Hälfte des 7. Jahrhunderts). Acta Archaeologica (København) 64, 1993, pp. 183–292.

== Sources ==
- Georg Kossack and Günter Ulbert, Studien zur vor- und frühgeschichtlichen Archäologie. Festschrift für Joachim Werner zum 65. Geburtstag (München 1974) (Münchner Beiträge zur Vor- und Frühgeschichte, Ergänzungsband, 1) ISBN 3-406-00344-3
- Mario Brozzi, 'Joachim Werner (1909–1994)' in Mem. Stor. Forogiuliesi 73 (1993), p. 349.
- Volker Bierbrauer, 'Joachim Werner. 23.12.1909 - 9.1.1994', Bayerische Vorgeschichtsblätter 59 (1994), p. 11-17.
- Volker Bierbrauer, 'Joachim Werner, 23.12.1909 - 9.1.1994', Byzantinische Zeitschrift 86/87 (1993/94) pp. 665–669.
- Slavko Ciglenečki, 'Joachim Werner (1909–1994)', Arh. Vestnik 45 (1994), pp. 267–268.
- Gerhard Fingerlin, 'Joachim Werner, 1909–1994', Fundberichte aus Baden-Württemberg 19,1 (1994), pp. 797–800.
- Kazimierz Godłowski, 'Joachim Werner (1909–1994)', Wiadomości Arch. 53,2 (1993/94), pp. 137–138.
- Titus Kolník, 'Joachim Werner (1909–1994)', Slovenská Arch. 42,1 (1994) 221-224.
- Georg Kossack, 'Joachim Werner. 23.12.1909 - 9.1.1994', Jahrbuch der Bayerischen Akademie der Wissenschaften 1994, pp. 234–245.
- M. B. Ščukin, 'Pamjati Iochima Vernera. (Obryvki vospominanij.) Zum Andenken an Joachim Werner', Peterburgskij Arch. Vestnik 8 (1994), pp. 4–11
- Elmar Vonbank, 'Univ.-Prof. Dr. Joachim Werner (23.12.1909 - 9.1.1994)', Jahrbuch des Vorarlberger Landesmuseumsvereines 138 (1994), pp. 55–59.
- Radu Harhoiu, 'Joachim Werner (23.12.1909 - 9.1.1994)', Dacia N. S. 38/39 (1994/95), pp. 489–491.
- Ion Ioniţa, 'Joachim Werner. 1909–1994' Arh. Moldovei 18 (1995), pp. 357–359.
- Gisela Ripoll López, 'Joachim Werner (Berlin 1909-Munich 1994)', Antiquité Tardive 3 (1995), pp. 10–14.
- Kazimierz Godłowski, 'Joachim Werner', Kultura przeworska 3 (1997), 9-15.
- Hubert Fehr, 'Hans Zeiss, Joachim Werner und die archäologischen Forschungen zur Merwingerzeit', in Heiko Steuer (Ed.): Eine hervorragend nationale Wissenschaft (Ergänzungsbände zum Reallexikon der Germanischen Altertumskunde), Vol. 29 (Berlin 2001), p. 311-415.
