= Zeitschrift für deutsches Altertum und deutsche Literatur =

- Discipline: German studies
- Language: German
- Edited by: Jürgen Wolf

Publication details
- Former name: Zeitschrift für deutsches Alterthum
- History: 1841–present
- Publisher: S. Hirzel Verlag (Germany)
- Frequency: Quarterly

Standard abbreviations
- ISO 4: Z. Dtsch. Altert. Dtsch. Lit.

Indexing
- ISSN: 0044-2518
- LCCN: sn85004980
- JSTOR: 00442518
- OCLC no.: 645345094

Links
- Journal homepage; Online tables of content

The Zeitschrift für deutsches Altertum und deutsche Literatur (commonly abbreviated ZfdA) is a quarterly peer-reviewed academic journal in the field of German studies with emphasis on the older periods. It was established in 1841 and is the oldest periodical in early Germanic studies still publishing.

== History ==
The journal was established in 1841 by Moriz Haupt as the Zeitschrift für deutsches Alterthum (older spelling) with the objective of applying the same rigour to the philology and textual criticism of medieval German texts as was already current with Greek and Latin.

With volume 13 (1867) the Zeitschrift für deutsches Alterthum began a new series (German: Neue Folge). In 1876, with volume 19 (New Series 7) its name was changed to the present Zeitschrift für deutsches Altertum und deutsche Literatur and a supplement, the Anzeiger, began publication as a journal of reviews; this sometimes overshadowed the parent journal.

The journal has appeared in quarterly issues since 1931. It was originally published by the Weidmannsche Buchhandlung, first in Leipzig, from 1856 in Berlin. With the third issue of volume 82 (1948/50), Franz Steiner Verlag took over publication. The current publisher is S. Hirzel Verlag.

Since volume 140 (2011) the editor-in-chief has been Jürgen Wolf (University of Marburg).

=== Editors ===
- 1841 – 1874: Moriz Haupt (only 16 volumes appeared)
- 1874 – 1883: Karl Müllenhoff and Elias von Steinmeyer
- 1874 – 1890: Elias von Steinmeyer
- 1891 – 1926: Gustav Roethe and Edward Schröder
- 1926 – 1931: Edward Schröder
- 1932 – 1938: Edward Schröder and Arthur Hübner
- 1939 – 1955: Julius Schwietering
- 1956 – 1963: Julius Schwietering and Friedrich Ohly
- 1963 – 1969: Friedrich Ohly
- 1969 – 1985: Kurt Ruh
- 1986 – 1997: Franz Josef Worstbrock
- 1998 – 2010: Joachim Heinzle
- 2011 – present: Jürgen Wolf

== Editorial philosophy ==
Haupt wrote a statement of purpose in the first issue in which he set out the journal's range: "the literature, language, customs, legal history [and] belief of German antiquity". The major focus from the beginning was publishing editions of Old and Middle High German works, which were presented for the most part for an academic readership, without explanatory material. The journal "quickly became the most important academic forum for the 'Berlin school'". In reaction to the narrowness of its approach, a quarterly named Germania was founded by Franz Pfeiffer in 1856, with the objective of reflecting the broader approach of Jacob Grimm and of classical philology and of therefore laying a greater emphasis on articles than editions. The foundation of the Zeitschrift für deutsche Philologie in 1868 was also a reaction to the ZfdA's restricted focus, in its case intended to supplement it. For at least a century, this emphasis on philology and relatively few changes of editor left the Zeitschrift für deutsches Altertum und deutsche Literatur largely untouched by changes in opinion in the field. Until the end of World War II, the editor was traditionally the Chairman of the Faculty of Germanistik at the University of Berlin. It was a relatively impersonal publication, sometimes accused of arrogance, and did not even include death notices for many decades.
