= Palestinabuch =

Alleged lost manuscript by Herman Wirth

The Palestinabuch (Book of Palestine), also Palestina Buch, Palästinabuch or Palästina Buch, is an allegedly lost manuscript by the German-Dutch historian and antisemite Herman Wirth (1885–1981), founder of the German Ahnenerbe, which its adherents claim would have changed the world if it had not disappeared. The myth plays a part in antisemitic theories maintaining that the Ashkenazi Jews descend largely or entirely from the Khazars or from Central Asia.

== Herman Wirth ==
Wirth, who was one of the main spokesmen of Pre-War Ariosophy, first referred to the Palestinabuch in his commentary to the Ura Linda Chronicle (1933), a 19th-century literary forgery that he thought to be genuine. The Chronicle tells the story of a lost civilization in the Polar Region or the Northern Atlantic, from which the Aryan, Hyperborean or Nordic races descended. The Frisian people, as being the direct offspring of the first Nordic settlers, had been able to preserve the cultural traditions of their forebears, which he considered as a key to the understanding of primeval monotheism. According to Wirth, Christ descended from a lost tribe of the original Aryans, who had left their traces in the Near East in the form of Megalithic monuments. Christianity, however, was corrupted by oriental despotism and local superstition, and came back to the Northern Europe in a distorted manner. As Judaism was largely responsible for this distortion, Christianity had to be cleansed from Judaic elements and revert to its original fertility cults, in which the Mother Goddess played a central part.

The Palestinabuch may have been conceived as a counterpart to the Ura Linda Chronicle. It was officially titled The Riddle of the Palestine's Megalithic Graves: From JAU to Jesus. By 1969 the proposed title had changed into Between the North Sea and the Sea of Genezareth, implicitly referring to an influential book by the 19th-century reactionary Julius Langbehn, Rembrandt as Educator (1890). The subtitle shifted between The Savior Myth of the Megalithic Religion's Crucified God and The Oriental-Occidental Community of the Megalithic Era.

According to Miguel Serrano, Wirth considered the book his main opus, on which he had worked for many years. Both men probably first met in the late 1960s, when Serrano served as a diplomat in Vienna.

Wirth's biographers do not mention the topic, though it is conceivable that the manuscripts have been hidden or destroyed by his collaborators because of their antisemitic tendencies. Or that, for the same reason, references to the supposed text have been deliberately ignored by the administrators of his estate. Even Wirth's loyal publisher, the neonazi Wilhelm Landig left several manuscripts Wirth wrote for him unprinted.

== Miguel Serrano ==
Herman Wirth died in February 1981. Some time before, on 3 September 1979, he was interviewed by the Chilean former diplomat and Nazi propagandist Miguel Serrano (1917–2009), who asked him about the history of the Jewish people. The story is told in Serrano's Adolf Hitler: The Ultimate Avatar (1984):

It is difficult to know the true origin of this people. In the visit I made to professor Herman Wirth, founder of the Ahnenerbe, high specialized organism of investigation of the SS, and one of the most extraordinary students of Nordic pre-antiquity, I asked him about the Jews. He gave me a strange unexpected answer: "Nomadic people, from slaves, who lived on the periphery of the great civilization of the Gobi..." I deeply regret not having asked more about this. [...] When I knew him he was 94 years old and remained agile and alert. Even then, not long before dying, the manuscripts of his work were stolen from him, it is believed by his own collaborators. Marxist infiltrators, or perhaps even Catholics, caused this most valuable work to disappear. The world will never know of it. It is a tragedy as great as the destruction of the Library of Alexandria. At least for me. The identical hand will have committed the same crime to cover up evidence.

In subsequent publications Serrano blamed "the Great Conspiracy" for the loss. Wirth's book would have "definitively clarified the true history of the Jews", but "the manuscript may now be found in some synagogue or in the subterranean vaults beneath the Vatican".

According to Serrano, Wirth told him that the Frisian Sea-Kings, survivors of the catastrophe of Polar Hyperborea, first met the Jews in Northern Africa, where they were known as Golen (Gauls) or Golem, but the Frisians nicknamed them Triuweden (druids), meaning 'those who have no truth'. Moreover, the Jews then emigrated as parasites on the Hyperborean Aryans after the destruction of the post-Hyperborean civilization of the Gobi Desert (Shambhala).

The story plays an important part in Serrano's Esoteric Hitlerism, in which the world is heading towards an ultimate combat between the Aryan forces of Light and the forces of Darkness, embodied in the false ideologies of Judeo-Christianity.

== Aleksandr Dugin ==
During the early 1990s, the Russian political theorist and philosopher Aleksandr Dugin (1962) spent two years studying Wirth's books. He devoted a whole volume, Hyperborean Theory: The Experience of Ariosophic Research (1993), to Wirth's geopolitical and religio-historical views. Apparently, this is "one of the most extensive summaries and treatments of Wirth in any language". Dugin probably first referred to the Palestinabuch in one of his controversial 1993 TV-shows with journalist Yury Vorobyevsky [Юрий Воробьевский], in which he claimed to have had access to the secret KGB-archives on the Ahnenerbe, captured by the Red Army in 1945. He subsequently elaborated the theme, suggesting that Wirth's superior knowledge was based on the Ahnenerbe's "vast archaeological material obtained during excavations in Palestine", to his judgement the most experienced organization of the time. As soon as Wirth's would apply his symbolic historical methods,

[...] there is no line, not a word in the Old Testament that would not succumb to such Hyperborean deconstruction. [...] What Wirth did was resacralize, reveal the original, Hyperborean gnosis - the true foundation of the Old Testament tradition, free it from biased interpretative models. [...] Unfortunately, now we can only guess about its contents. [...] Already in the 70s, when Wirth almost finished writing it, the only completed edition disappeared without a trace. In the scientist's absence, unknown people entered the house, turned everything upside down, but only took the Palestina Buch. Wirth turned to his students (there were two or three unfinished copies), but the mysterious strangers had also visited them.

Since the first publications on the topic of Dugin and Vorobyevsky, the idea of Jewish-American conspiracy being responsible for the loss of Wirth's world-explaining encyclopaedia, has gained foothold in Russian nationalist circles.

Recently, the idea of the lost Palestinabuch has also gained hold among rightwing radicals in the United States.
