= W. J. Perry =

British anthropologist

William James Perry (1887–1949), usually known as W. J. Perry, was an academic in cultural anthropology at University College, London.

Megalith culture, according to him, was transmitted to the rest of the world from Egypt.

He was a convinced hyperdiffusionist and collaborated with Grafton Elliot Smith. He was also interested in the history of religion. His daughter, a chemist, Margaret, married the eminent physiologist, Professor Robert Harkness.

== Publications ==
- The Megalithic Culture of Indonesia (1918)
- The Children of the Sun (1923)
- The Children of the Sun: a Study in the Early History of Civilization (London: Methuen, 1923); alternate title: The Children of the Sun: A Study of the Egyptian Settlement of the Pacific
- The Origin of Magic and Religion (1923)
- The Growth of Civilization (1924)
- Gods and Men: The Attainment of Immortality (1927)
- The Primordial Ocean: An Introductory Contribution to Social Psychology (1935)
