= Anne Walbank Buckland =

British anthropologist, author

Anne Walbank Buckland, M.A.I. (1832–1899) was a British anthropologist, ethnologist, and travel writer. She presented new ideas on mythology, symbolism and custom.

== Early life ==
Buckland's father, William Buckland, was a civil engineer and surveyor. The family lived in the rural hamlet of Bremilham, near Malmesbury, Wiltshire, England. By the age of 19, Buckland was working as a governess in Netherbury, Dorset.

== Anthropology ==
After it voted to admit women on 9 March 1875, Buckland was one of the first women to join The Anthropological Institute of Great Britain and Ireland (since 1907, Royal Anthropological Institute of Great Britain and Ireland). She donated a photograph to the Institute, which was used by the Rev. Henry Neville Hutchinson (1856–1927) to encourage and instruct members in collecting quality photographs for ethnological research. In his 1899 address to members, Frederick William Rudler (1840–1915), the president of the institute, remarked about Buckland, that after more than twenty years of scientific contributions, "No other lady in this country, has to my knowledge, done so much to popularize anthropology as was accomplished by our valued friend".

Buckland also joined the British Association for the Advancement of Science, and was elected an Honorary Member of the Bath Royal Literary and Scientific Institution (BRLSI) on 23 Mar 1876 for her work in arranging the Lockey Museum (the anthropological section of the museum). Although the Royal Colonial Institute did not permit women to become Fellows during her lifetime, Buckland did attend its meetings.

Some of her ideas on mythology, symbolism and custom were contrary to other anthropologists at that time, including that agriculturists were the first to worship the moon, that this worship preceded that of the sun deity in Egypt, China and the East, and that it was metallurgists who originated worship of the sun and serpents. She suggested, that based on the prominence given to the rabbit in artifacts of American sculptures and hieroglyphics, that either the Eastern hemisphere influenced ideas and customs of prehistoric society in America or vice versa. Fritze considered Buckland to be a "proto-hyper-diffusionist" who advanced the idea that aspects of ancient culture were dispersed or "diffused" to other cultures and continents by way of trade interactions and migration, rather than arising by coincidence. Later proponents of "hyperdiffusionism", who built upon her work, became more Egyptocentric than she, such as Sir Grafton Elliot Smith (1871–1937).

Buckland published anthropological papers in The Westminster Review and the Journal of the Anthropological Institute, many of which were the basis of oral presentations at scientific meetings. A collection of her scholarly essays, Anthropological Studies, was recognized internationally and added to the library of the US Bureau of Ethnology (now Bureau of American Ethnology) in 1883.

== Legacy ==
Great Britain added Buckland to its Civil List Pension, an annual monetary award in recognition of her scientific work. She provided BRLSI with numerous artifacts for its collection, including several stone implements and weapons collected from Cape Flats, South Africa by Dr. Langham Dale. A contemporary of Buckland, Dale was among the first scholars to recognize and publish findings of prehistoric stone artifacts in southern Africa. Artifacts associated with Buckland are also in the collection at the Pitt Rivers Museum, including a Later Stone Age bored stone from the Cape of Good Hope. Her 1893 book of heirloom international recipes set in historical context is considered a classic culinary text, continues to be reproduced, and is widely available.
