= Grafton Elliot Smith =

Anatomist and egyptologist

Professor Sir Grafton Elliot Smith FRS FRSE FRCP
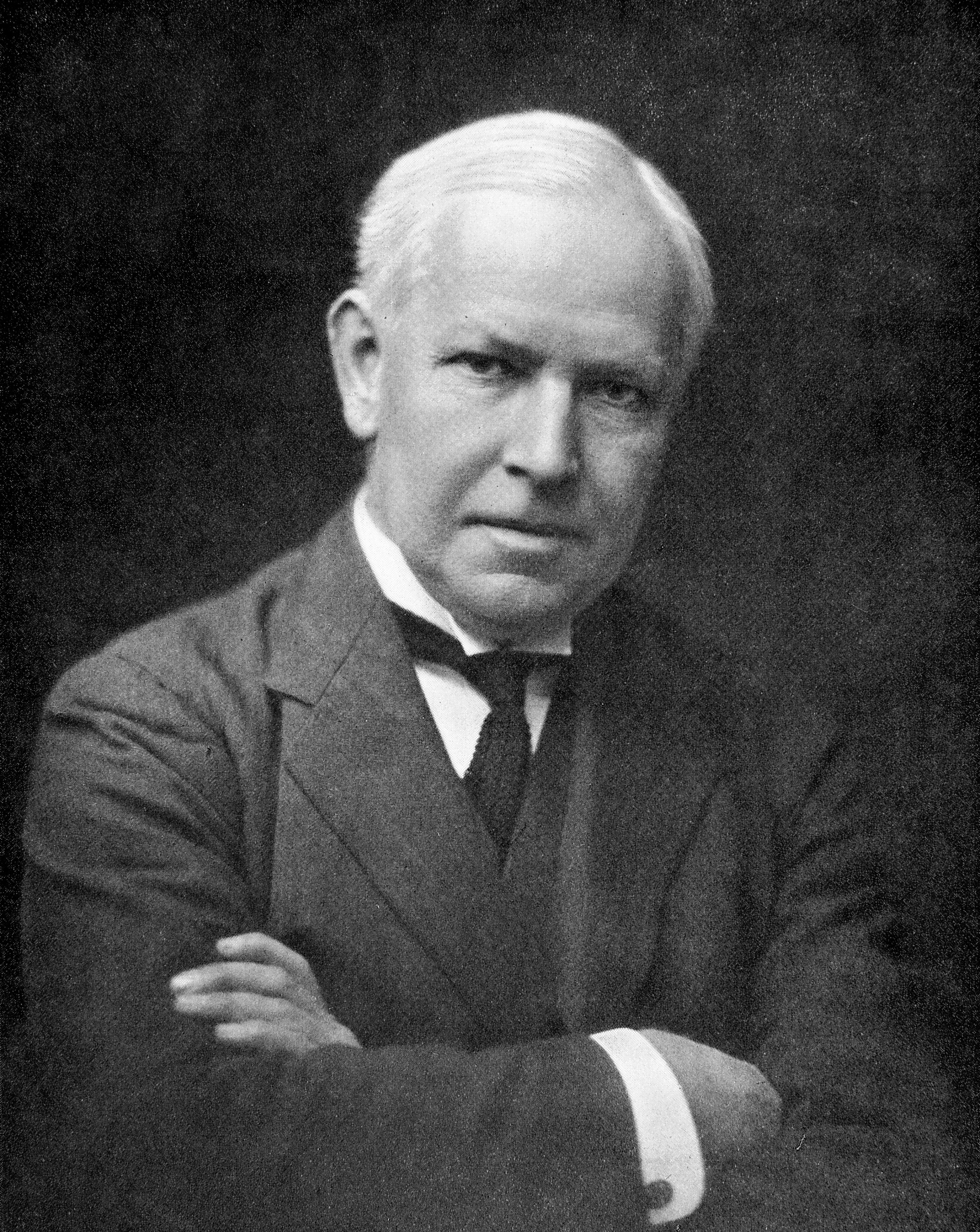
- Grafton Elliot Smith
- Born: 15 August 1871; Grafton, New South Wales
- Died: 1 January 1937 (aged 65); Broadstairs, Kent, England
- Education: University of Sydney, University of Cambridge
- Spouse: Kathleen Macreadie (m. 1902)
- Awards: Royal Medal (1912); Fellow of the Royal Society
- Scientific career
- Fields: Anatomy; Archaeology

Sir Grafton Elliot Smith (15 August 1871 – 1 January 1937) was an Australian-British anatomist, Egyptologist and a proponent of the hyperdiffusionist view of prehistory. He believed in the idea that cultural innovations occur only once and that they spread geographically. Based on this, he traced the origins of many cultural and traditional practices across the world, including the New World, to ideas that he believed came from Egypt and in some instances from Asia. An expert on brain anatomy, he was one of the first to study Egyptian mummies using radiological techniques. He took an interest in extinct humanoids and was embroiled in controversy over the authenticity of the Piltdown Man.

== Professional career ==
Smith was born in Grafton, New South Wales to Stephen Sheldrick Smith who had moved to Australia from London in 1860 and Mary Jane, née Evans. He received his early education from Grafton Public School where his father was headmaster. When the family moved to Sydney in 1883 he went to Darlington Public School before joining Sydney Boys High School. He attended evening classes on physiology by Thomas Anderson Stuart and took an early interest in biology. In an autobiographical note Smith noted that Stuart had shown them the convolutions of the human brain and declared that nobody understood them fully. Smith decided at that point that he would work towards understanding them. Accordingly, he went to study medicine at the University of Sydney in 1888 and received a Doctor of Medicine in 1895, with a dissertation on the fore-brain of the monotremes) and developed an interest in the anatomy of the human brain. He received a James King travelling scholarship and went to St John's College, Cambridge, graduating BA in 1896. Afterwards he catalogued the human brain-collection of the British Museum.

Smith obtained an appointment at the Cairo School of Medicine in 1900 on the suggestion of his anthropologist friend Alexander Macalister. Smith became archaeological advisor to the archaeological survey of Nubia in the wake of plans to construct the Aswan Dam which threatened to drown numerous archaeological sites. Smith conducted investigations on the brains of Egyptian mummies. He was one of the first to non-destructively use x-rays to study mummies. Smith took a special interest in the pathologies indicated in ancient skeletal remains. He noted for instance that many Egyptian skulls had biparietal thinning which had been common in European aristocrats in the past. Smith hypothesized this was the result of wearing heavy wigs or headgear. From 1909 to 1919 he was Professor in anatomy in Manchester, 1919–1937 he held the chair of Anatomy at the University College London. He was elected President of the Anatomical Society of Great Britain and Ireland for 1924 to 1927. During World War I he took an interest in the neurology of shell shock, visiting military hospitals and serving on the British General Medical Council.

Smith was the leading specialist on the evolution of the brain of his day. Many of his ideas on the evolution of the primate brain still form the core of present scholarship. He proposed the following stages of development:

1. a smell-dominated insectivore of the jumping shrew-type
2. vision-dominated animals with an expanded cortex of tree-shrew-type
3. acutely visioned, manually dexterous mammals of tarsius-type
4. monkeys
5. anthropoids using their hands to use and produce tools

== Honours and awards ==
Smith was decorated by the Khedive of Egypt, Abbas Hilmy in 1909 with an Insignia of the Third Class of the Imperial Ottoman Order of the Osmaniah. He became Fellow of the Royal Society in 1907, FRCP, elected to membership of the Manchester Literary and Philosophical Society on 4 October 1910, President of the Society 1919, cross of the French Legion of Honour, and was knighted in the 1934 Birthday Honours. In 1912 he received the Royal Medal of the Royal Society, in 1930 the Honorary Gold Medal of the Royal College of Surgeons, in 1936 the Huxley Memorial Medal from the Royal Anthropological Institute of Great Britain and Ireland.

== European hypothesis ==
British anthropologists Arthur Keith and Grafton Elliot Smith both supported the European origin of humankind as opposed to models of Asian and African origin. In several of his works, Smith argued that Europe was the cradle of humanity, identifying a European Mediterranean race as the occupants of the original home of modern humans. His cradle was large, as he claimed the Mediterranean race had occupied the Levant, Egypt and western Europe, including the British Isles. He especially linked the Mediterranean race to the civilisation of Egypt. Smith's arguments later became known as his theory of diffusionism. According to Smith and William James Perry, Egypt was the source of all cultural innovations and the ultimate source of human civilisation.

According to Smith, "Man did not become truly erect until his brain had developed in a very particular way to make it possible for him to use his hands". That line of reasoning reinforced the European origin of human, which Smith and Keith supported, as the mostly large brained specimens such as the Cro-Magnon had been found in Europe.

=== Hyperdiffusionism ===
The term 'hyperdiffusionism' seems to have been coined by the British archaeologist Glyn Daniel in his book The Idea of Prehistory (1962) with a somewhat derogatory intention. It was intended to represent extremes of diffusionism, a theme popular in early 20th century archaeology that itself has been subject to criticism. Smith believed that all megalithic phenomena, whether in Northwestern Europe, India, Japan or Mesoamerica, had originated in Ancient Egypt. "Small groups of people, moving mainly by sea, settled at certain places and there made rude imitations of the Egyptian monuments of the Pyramid Age." (Smith 1911, ix). Smith believed in a direct diffusion to Syria, Crete, East Africa, Southern Arabia and Sumer, and other areas were influenced by secondary diffusion. The Neolithic culture of Europe was derived from Egypt as well, according to Smith. He even interpreted a mummy from a Torres Strait island as definitely being indicative of an Egyptian influence. The concept of hyperdiffusionism is now referred to by more neutral terms (when referring to the Americas) such as Pre-Columbian trans-oceanic contact.

Smith interpreted a small carving detail in Copán stela B as an elephant, an animal unknown in the New World. Alfred Maudslay had described the detail as being a stylised tapir. Smith argued that the carving shows an elephant with a mahout atop it. He went on to point out many Asian features in the sculpture in his book Elephants and ethnologists (1924).

==== Egypt ====
Egypt held a fortunate geographical position that made contacts to western Asia and the Mediterranean possible, while being safe from invasions. The fertile soil led to ample leisure, in art and the crafts could be cultivated. Smith believed that agriculture had originated in Egypt and only later spread to Mesopotamia. "The earliest cultivators of the soil in Egypt were in fact laying the foundations not merely of agriculture and irrigation but of all the arts and craft, the social organization and religious beliefs which became an integral part of the civilization that was being built up sixty centuries ago and in later ages was diffused throughout the world." (Smith 1911, 6)

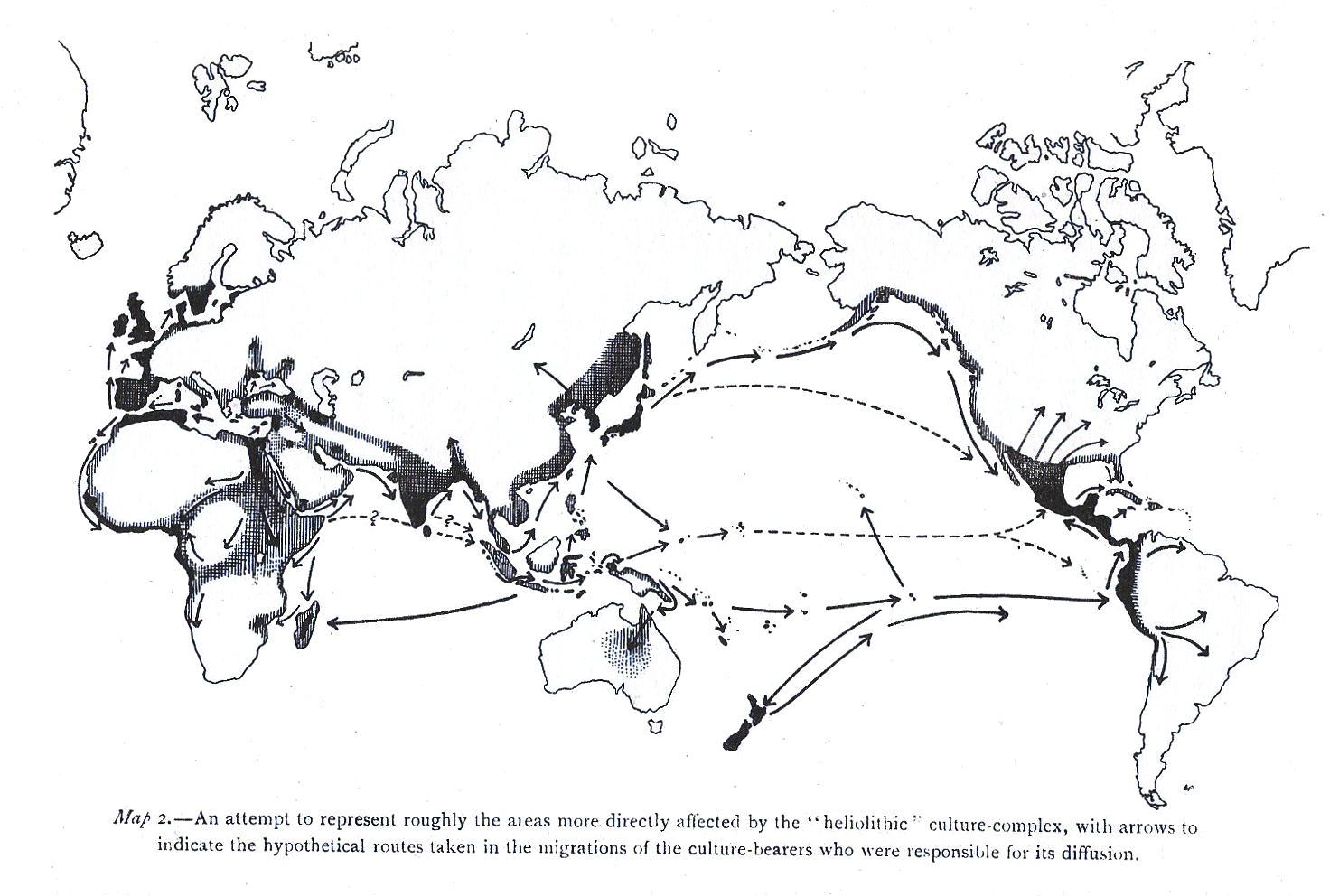
Cultural diffusion map from Egypt by Grafton Elliot Smith (1929).

Artificial irrigation led to cooperation and the development of a central government that was based on professional knowledge, a rule of hydraulic engineers. The prosperity of everybody depended on a successful administration and a strong central government (cf. Karl Wittfogel's hydraulic hypothesis). Later on, the leading engineer became a sacred king (cf. Henri Frankfort) and a god (Osiris) after death. Ritual and magic formed the germs of the first sciences, of biology and physics. The building of tombs initiated the development of architecture.

Other inventions of the Egyptians were:

- Weaving
- Metal working (gold and copper)
- Calendar
- Seagoing ships
- "Art of shaving"
- Wigs
- Hats
- Pillows

At first, Smith remained vague on the reasons for the spread of Egyptian influence to places without mineral deposits like Polynesia. However, in 1915 William James Perry, a professor of comparative religion at the University of Manchester, advanced the view that the "megalith-builders" were looking for pearls and precious stones, which Smith adopted as well.

Smith did not believe that the spread of culture was necessarily connected to a certain race, in contrast to other diffusionists, like the German prehistorian Gustaf Kossinna. While he saw a racial affinity between the Egyptians and the first agriculturalists of southern Europe, both being of the "brown race," the spread of civilisation was mainly a spread of ideas, not of tribes or people.

However, in The Ancient Egyptians and their Influence Upon the Civilization of Europe, written in 1911, he clearly demonstrates a steep rise in "Asiatic traits (Armenoid, Alpine, Celtic)," within the Egyptian aristocracy, to Dynastic Egypt itself (among other pre-historical phenomena).

In early 1923, Smith wrote a series of articles for The Daily Telegraph regarding the discovery of the tomb of Tutankhamun. Those articles deal with the condition of royal and other mummies that were found before 1922. Smith stated that Tutankhamen "narrowly escaped" the fate of being "hacked to pieces" by robbers, as was the case with the mummy of Amenhotep II.

==== History ====
In the age of Colonialism, hyperdiffusionism proved attractive, as it showed how missionaries, engineers and prospectors had spread civilisation all over the earth, as the colonial nations believed that they were doing themselves.

Later on, hyperdiffusionism supplied a single simple explanation of the complex process of neolithisation that made it attractive to amateur archaeologists worldwide. It could be used to retain a Eurocentric view on history in the face of increasing evidence for impressive autochthonous development, such as in Zimbabwe (Great Zimbabwe), Polynesia (Easter Island), and Micronesia (Nan Madol on the island of Pohnpei).

Now, it is widely believed that the megalithic graves of Britain, Ireland, France, Portugal, the Netherlands, Denmark, northern Germany, and Poland are much older than the Egyptian pyramids, and the Mesoamerican pyramids are more recent and considered to be local cultural innovations.

== Private life ==
His father had migrated to New South Wales from London. He had attended a working men's college under John Ruskin and later became a teacher and headmaster in Grafton, New South Wales. His older brother (Stephen H. Smith) was later Director of Education in New South Wales; his younger brother (Stewart Arthur Smith) was Acting Professor of Anatomy at the University of Sydney.

He married Kathleen Macreadie in 1902 just before moving to Cairo. During his time in London, he lived variously in Hampstead, Gower Street, and at Regent's Park. During his London years, he became a friend of W. H. R. Rivers.

Smith's youngest son, Stephen Smith, died in an accident in 1936. Smith spent his final year in a nursing home in London.

Grafton Smith died on New Year's Day 1 January 1937 at Broadstairs in Kent.

== Bibliography ==
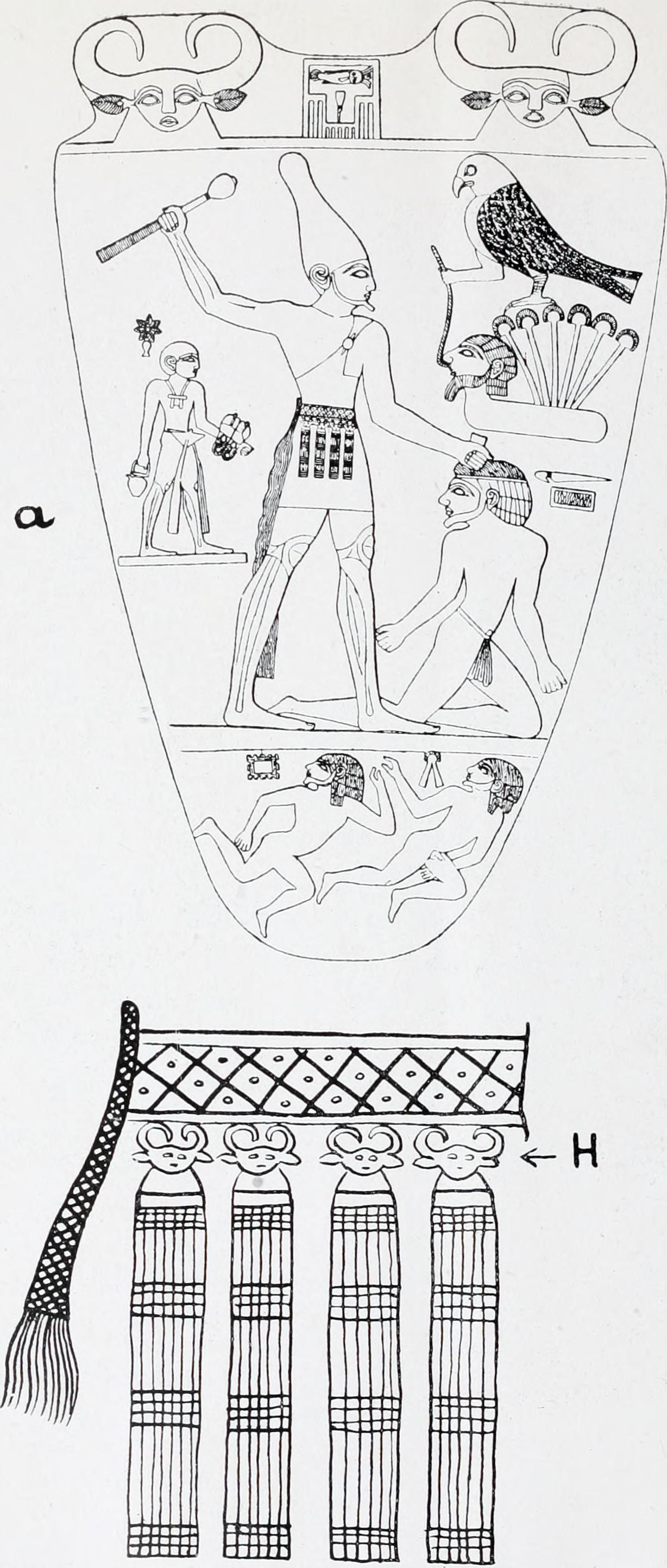
Hathor (fig. 18 in The Evolution of the Dragon)

Warren Dawson's list of Smith's publications includes 434 publications. Among the most important are:

- The Natural Subdivision of the Cerebral Hemisphere (1901).
- The Primary Subdivisions of the Mammalian Cerebellum (1902).
- The Ancient Egyptians and the origin of Civilization (London/New York, Harper & Brother 1911).
- Catalogue of the Royal Mummies in the Museum of Cairo (Cairo 1912).
- The Egyptian Mummies (with Warren R Dawson (New York, 1924)
- The Migrations of Early Culture (1915)
- On the Significance of the geographical distribution of Mummification – a study of the migrations of peoples and the spread of certain customs and beliefs (1916).
- The Evolution of the Dragon (1919)
- (with T. H. Pear) Shell Shock and its Lessons (1917, 2nd edition)
- Tutankhamen and the Discovery of his Tomb (1923)
- Evolution of Man: Essays (1924, 2nd edition 1927)
- Human History (1930)
- The Diffusion of Culture (London, Watts 1933)
- Elephants and Ethnologists (1924)
- Serle, Percival (1949). "Smith, Grafton Elliot". Dictionary of Australian Biography. Sydney: Angus & Robertson.
- A. P. Elkin/N. W. G. Macintosh, Grafton Elliot Smith, The Man and his Work (Sydney University Press 1974)
- W. R. Dawson, Sir Grafton Elliot Smith: a Biographical Record by his Colleagues (London, Cape 1938)

== Works cited ==
- Smith, Graftoon Elliot (19 January 1923a). "The Tomb of Tutankhamen". The Daily Telegraph. pp. 9–10.
- Smith, Graftoon Elliot (23 January 1923b). "The Tomb of Tutankhamen". The Daily Telegraph. p. 9.
- Smith, Graftoon Elliot (25 January 1923c). "The Tomb of Tutankhamen". The Daily Telegraph. p. 9.

Academic offices
Preceded by J. B. S. Haldane	Fullerian Professor of Physiology; 1933–1935	Succeeded by Edward Mellanby
Professional and academic associations
Preceded by William Thomson	President of the Manchester Literary and Philosophical Society; 1919	Succeeded by Sir Henry Alexander Miers
Preceded by James Thomas Wilson	President of the Anatomical Society; 1924–1927	Succeeded by Edward Fawcett
