= Gustav Roethe =

German philologist (1859-1926)

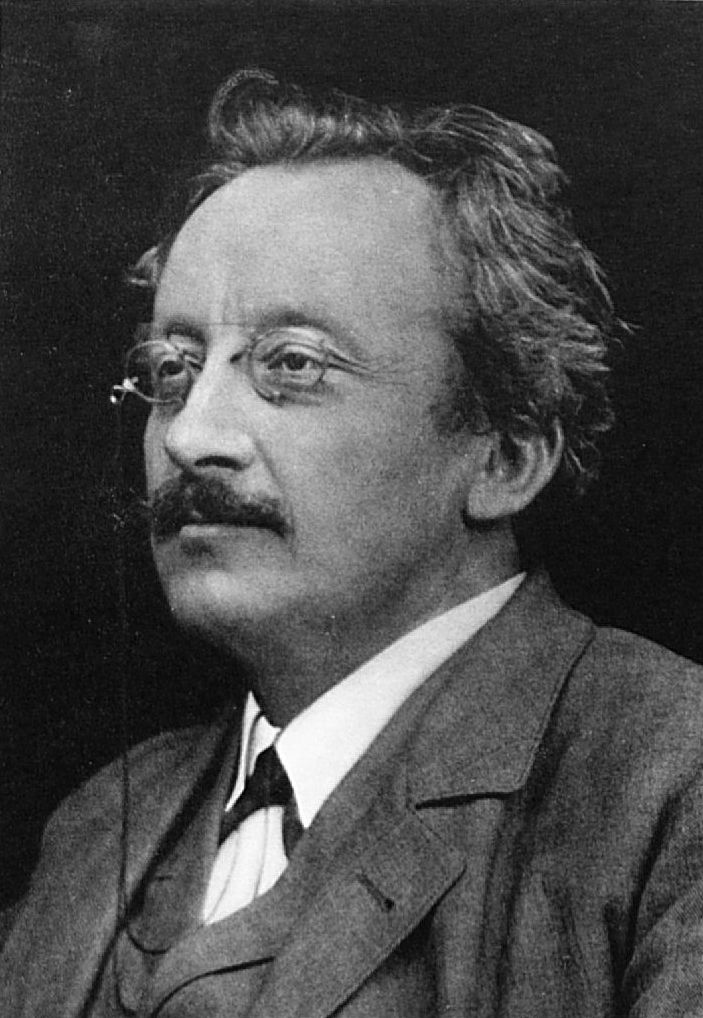
- Gustav Roethe
- Born: 5 May 1859; Graudenz
- Died: 17 September 1926 (aged 67)
- Occupation: philologist

Gustav Roethe (5 May 1859, Graudenz – 17 September 1926, Bad Gastein) was a German philologist.

== Life ==
Roethe studied classical and Germanic philology in Göttingen, Leipzig and Berlin, obtaining his PhD in 1881 (doctoral advisor, Friedrich Zarncke). In 1888, he succeeded Karl Goedeke as an associate professor of German philology at the University of Göttingen, and two years later, succeeded Wilhelm Konrad Hermann Müller as a full professor of German language and literature. In 1902, he relocated to the University of Berlin, where in 1923/24 he served as rector.

His studies largely dealt with Middle High German literature, German Romanticism and "Goethe-research". His Die Gedichte Reinmars von Zweter ("Poetry of Reinmar von Zweter") formed the basis for research involving the history of Middle High German Sangspruchdichtung (epigrammatic poetry). From 1908 onward, he was tasked with reorganization of the "Deutsches Wörterbuch" of the Brothers Grimm.

From 1891 to 1926, with Edward Schröder, he was editor of the "Zeitschrift für deutsches Altertum und deutsche Literatur". In 1921 he was named president of the Goethe Society.

== Selected works ==
- Reinmars von Zweter, Herkunft und Aufenthalt in Oesterreich unter Leopold VII, 1883.
- Die Gedichte Reinmars von Zweter, 1887.
- Die Reimvorreden des Sachsenspiegels, 1899.
- Jacob Grimms Vorlesungen über deutsche Litteraturgeschichte, 1899.
- Brentanos 'Ponce de Leon' : eine Säcularstudie, 1901.
- Nibelungias und Waltharius, 1909.
- Das geraubte deutsche Westpreußen, 1926.
- Goethe : gesammelte Vorträge und Aufsätze, 1932.
