= Franz Altheim =

German historian and philologist

- Born: 6 October 1898; Frankfurt, German Empire
- Died: 17 October 1976 (aged 78); Münster, West Germany

Academic background
- Education: University of Frankfurt
- Thesis: Die Komposition der Politik des Aristoteles (1921)
- Doctoral advisor: Hans von Arnim
- Other advisor: Walter F. Otto

Academic work
- Discipline: Philology
- Sub-discipline: Classical philology
- Institutions: University of Frankfurt; University of Halle; Free University of Berlin
- Notable students: Ruth Altheim-Stiehl
- Main interests: History of classical antiquity

Franz Altheim (6 October 1898 – 17 October 1976) was a German classical philologist and historian who specialized in the history of classical antiquity. During the 1930s and 1940s, Altheim served the Nazi state as a member of Ahnenerbe, a think tank controlled by the Schutzstaffel (SS), the paramilitary wing of the Nazi Party, and as a spy for the SS.

== Early life and education ==
Franz Altheim was born in Frankfurt, Germany, on 6 October 1898. His father was the painter Wilhelm Altheim. Altheim's mother left his father due to his heavy drinking and unconventional lifestyle. Depressed as a result, Wilhelm Altheim died by suicide on Christmas 1914.

Altheim studied classical philology and history at the University of Frankfurt beginning in 1916. During World War I in 1917, he joined the German Army, first attending a school for translators and then serving as a translator in Turkey. After the war, he tried and failed to become a sculptor before returning to school, supporting himself by working in a bank. Altheim majored in classical philology, archaeology, and linguistics. While in school, he traveled to Italy several times with the aid of government grants to study classical civilization. He earned his PhD at the University of Frankfurt in December 1921. His dissertation, Die Komposition der Politik des Aristoteles, was supervised by Hans von Arnim. Altheim received a scholarship from the Notgemeinschaft der Deutschen Wissenschaft in 1925, and gained his habilitation in 1928 with the thesis Griechische Götter im alten Rom, which was supervised by Walter F. Otto. During this time, Altheim became acquainted with Károly Kerényi and Leo Frobenius. Altheim was introduced to the deposed German emperor Wilhelm II, possibly by Frobenius. Wilhelm was then living at Doorn, Netherlands, where Altheim became a frequent visitor. Altheim was also a member of the George-Kreis literary society.

== Career ==
Altheim worked as a private lecturer at the University of Frankfurt from 1928 to 1935. He supplemented his income as a private art dealer. He initially appeared indifferent to the Nazis, who came to power in 1933. As the Nazis restricted academic freedom, Altheim was increasingly criticized by party officials and students and professors supportive of the party for failure to integrate Nazi ideology into his teaching. In 1935, a colleague wrote a letter to the Nazi Ministry of Education attacking Altheim for not incorporating Nazi doctrine into his work. This letter nearly prevented his appointment in 1936 as Associate Professor of Classical Philology at the University of Frankfurt. In the winter of 1936 he briefly served as Acting Chair of Classical Philology at the University of Halle. In 1937, Altheim was Associate Professor of Classical Philology at the University of Halle.

A member of the Sturmabteilung, Altheim conducted research projects with Ahnenerbe financing in the 1930s. With his partner Erika Trautmann, Altheim went on research expeditions to Italy, Sweden, Romania and the Middle East, during which he prepared reports for the Sicherheitsdienst, the intelligence agency of the Schutzstaffel and the Nazi Party. In 1943, Altheim was appointed Professor of Classical Philology at the University of Halle. His research centered on the history of classical antiquity, and many of his monographs on this subject were translated into other languages.

Altheim was dismissed from the University of Halle after World War II, but was soon reinstated. In 1948 he was appointed Professor of Ancient History at the University of Halle. In 1950, Altheim was appointed Chair of Ancient History at the newly created Free University of Berlin. After retiring in 1964, Altheim moved to Münster, where he died on 17 October 1976. He was survived by Ruth Altheim-Stiehl, his student and adoptive daughter.

== Selected works ==
- Griechische Götter im alten Rom, 1930
- Terra Mater, 1931
- Römische Religionsgeschichte, 1931–1933
- Epochen der römischen Geschichte, 1934–1935
- Lex sacrata, 1939
- Die Soldatenkaiser, 1939
- (with Erika Trautmann): Vom Ursprung der Runen, 1939
- (with Erika Trautmann): Italien und die dorische Wanderung, 1940
- Italien und Rom, 1941
- Rom und der Hellenismus, 1942
- Helios und Heliodor von Emesa, 1942
- (with Erika Trautmann-Nehring): Kimbern und Runen. Untersuchungen zur Ursprungsfrage der Runen, 1942
- Die Krise der alten Welt im 3. Jahrhundert n. Zw. und ihre Ursachen, 1943
- Goten und Finnen im dritten und vierten Jahrhundert, 1944
- Weltgeschichte Asiens im griechischen Zeitalter, 1947–1948
- Römische Geschichte, 1948–1958
- Literatur und Gesellschaft im ausgehenden Altertum, 1948–1950
- Der Ursprung der Etrusker, 1950
- Roman und Dekadenz, 1951
- Geschichte der lateinischen Sprache, 1951
- Aus Spätantike und Christentum, 1951
- Attila und die Hunnen, 1951
- Niedergang der alten Welt, 1952
- (with Ruth Stiehl): Asien und Rom, 1952
- Alexander und Asien, 1953
- Gesicht vom Abend und Morgen, 1954
- (with Ruth Stiehl): Ein asiatischer Staat, 1954
- Reich gegen Mitternacht, 1955
- Der unbesiegte Gott, 1957
- Utopie und Wirtschaft, 1957
- (with Ruth Stiehl): Finanzgeschichte der Spätantike, 1957
- (with Ruth Stiehl): Philologia sacra, 1958
- (with Ruth Stiehl): Die aramäische Sprache unter den Achaimeniden, 1959–1963
- Geschichte der Hunnen, 1959–1962
- Zarathustra und Alexander, 1960
- Entwicklungshilfe im Altertum, 1962
- Die Araber in der alten Welt, 1964–1969
- (with Ruth Stiehl): Geschichte Mittelasiens im Altertum, 1970
- (with Ruth Stiehl): Christentum am Roten Meer, 1971–1973

== See also ==
- Károly Kerényi
- Mircea Eliade

== Sources ==
- Ernst Baltrusch: Altheim, Franz. In: Peter Kuhlmann, Helmuth Schneider (Hrsg.): Geschichte der Altertumswissenschaften. Biographisches Lexikon (= Der Neue Pauly. Supplemente. Vol. 6). Metzler, Stuttgart/Weimar 2012, ISBN 978-3-476-02033-8, Sp. 24 f.
- "Franz Altheim". Martin Luther University of Halle-Wittenberg (in German).
