= Oera Linda Book =

1867 forgery or hoax

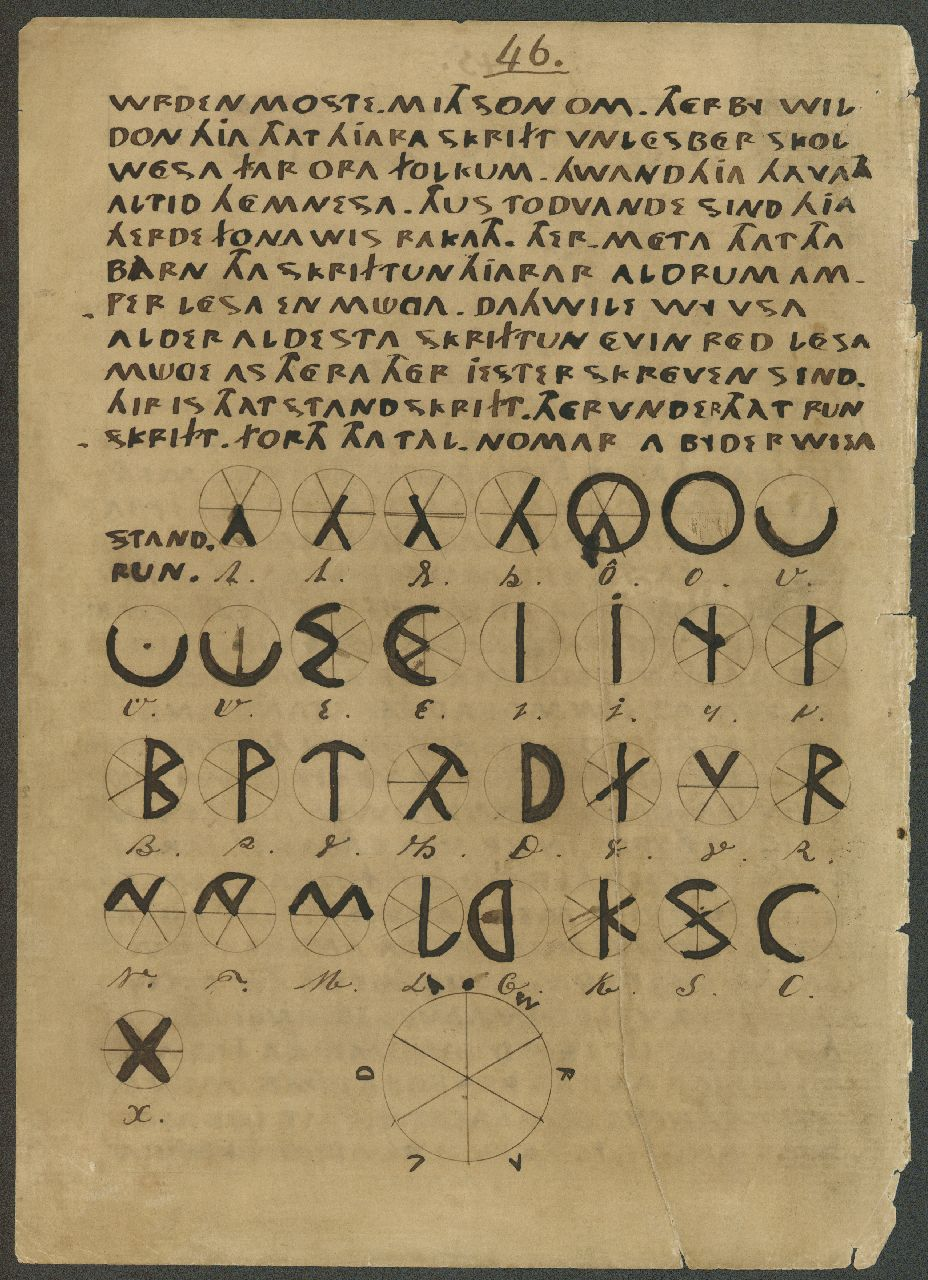
Page 48 of the Oera Linda manuscript

The Oera Linda Book is a manuscript written in imitated Old Frisian, purporting to cover historical, mythological, and religious themes of remote antiquity, from 2194 BCE to 803 CE. Among academics in Germanic philology, the document is considered to be a hoax or a fabrication.

The manuscript first came to public awareness in the 1860s. In 1872, Jan Gerhardus Ottema published a Dutch translation and defended it as genuine. Over the next few years there was a heated public controversy, but by 1879 it was universally accepted that the text was a recent composition. Nevertheless, a public controversy was revived in the context of 1930s Nazi occultism, and the book is still occasionally brought up in esotericism and Atlantis literature. The manuscript's author is not known with certainty, hence it is unknown whether the intention was to produce a pseudepigraphical hoax, a parody, or simply an exercise in poetic fantasy.

Historian Goffe Jensma published a monograph on the manuscript in 2004, De gemaskerde god (The Masked God), including a discussion of the history of its reception and a new translation in 2006. Jensma concludes that it was probably intended as a "hoax to fool some nationalist Frisians and orthodox Christians," as well as an "experiential exemplary exercise" by Dutch theologian and poet François Haverschmidt. He suggests that "the average well-educated nineteenth-century reader must have been able to translate the text if he wanted to. The pains of learning to read this language was to be rewarded with linguistic delicacies like the hundreds of puns, popular etymologies and funny words that were derived from almost every modern European language. When they were weary, the folksmothers for instance could retire to their ‘BEDRVM’ (bedroom)."

== History of reception ==
=== 19th century ===
The Oera Linda Book, known in Old Frisian as Thet Oera Linda Bok, came to light in 1867 when Cornelis Over de Linden (1811–1874) handed the manuscript, which he claimed to have inherited from his grandfather, via his aunt, over to Eelco Verwijs (1830–1880), the provincial librarian of Friesland, for translation and publication. Verwijs rejected the manuscript, but in 1872 Jan Gerhardus Ottema (1804–1879), a prominent member of the Frisian Society for History and Culture, published a Dutch translation. Ottema believed it to be written in authentic Old Frisian. The book was subsequently translated into English by William Sandbach in 1876, and published by Trübner & Co. of London.

Within the first few years after the appearance of the Oera Linda Book, its recent origin was established not only based on the exceptional claims being made, but also because of a number of anachronisms it contained. The text was nevertheless a source of inspiration for a number of occultists and speculative historians. While there was some debate among Dutch academics and in a number of newspapers about the book's authenticity during the 1870s, by 1879 it was widely recognized as a forgery.

=== Nazi Germany ===
More than forty years later, beginning in 1922, Dutch völkisch philologist Herman Wirth revived the issue. Wirth published a German translation of what he dubbed the "Nordic Bible" in 1933, as Die Ura Linda Chronik.

A panel discussion on Wirth's book at the University of Berlin on 4 May 1934 was the immediate impulse for the foundation of Ahnenerbe by Himmler and Wirth, together with Richard Walther Darré. Because of the infatuation of Himmler with the Oera Linda Book and its consequent association with Nazi occultism, it became known as "Himmler's Bible". Wirth's book was by no means universally acclaimed among the Nazi-era Nordicist academics, and the 1934 panel discussion was steeped in heated controversy. Alfred Rosenberg and his circle rejected it. Gustav Neckel had praised Wirth's work before publication, but upon seeing its content published a dismayed rescission.

Speaking in defense of the book's authenticity were Walther Wüst and Otto Huth, besides Wirth himself. Speaking against its authenticity were Neckel, Karl Hermann Jacob-Friesen (who said it was a satirical hoax by Linden) and Arthur Hübner. Hübner was one of the most respected Germanists of his generation, and his verdict of the Oera Linda being a falsification settled the defeat of Wirth's party. The public defeat of Himmler's scholarly brand of "esoteric Nordicism" resulted in the foundation of Ahnenerbe, which attracted occultists such as Karl Maria Wiligut and was viewed with suspicion by the mainstream National Socialist ideologues of Amt Rosenberg. It was placed on the party's list of forbidden books.

=== Modern esotericism ===
The book experienced a revival of popularity in the English-speaking world with the writings of Robert Scrutton. In The Other Atlantis (1977) he reproduced the full text of Sandbach's 1876 English translation, interspersed with his own commentaries on history and mythology. In Secrets of Lost Atland (1979) he became the first to link the book with the concept of earth mysteries, and, in particular, ley lines and telluric energy. Following Scrutton's example, English language accounts of the Oera Linda Book tend to place it within the New Age or alternate history genres, and do not associate it with National Socialism, as is the case in Germany.

Another figure to formulate a contemporary Neopagan tradition influenced by the Oera Linda Book was Tony Steele, who considered the book to reveal the genuine truth about the ancient European megalithic culture. In Water Witches (1998) he examined the book's use as a cultural identity marker by the Frisian-descended canal folk of the English Midlands. In The Rites and Rituals of Traditional Witchcraft (2001) he connected the religious practices of the priestesses described in the book with later medieval witchcraft traditions. Steele's 2023 horror thriller novel In a Flat Landscape also makes the Oera Linda Book a central part of the story.

Russia

A new stir rose in Russia in the 1990s when political philosopher Alexander Dugin took up the work of Herman Wirth. In his influential 1999 anthology Absoliutnaia rodina, he views the book of Oera Linda as a textbook example of a deeply rooted myth of the Aryan race that can easily be transformed into political ideologies. This is exactly what Dugin did, according to critics: the chronicle was used to support a Eurasianism worldview, while ironically he hated the epic from the Atlantic world. As a counterpart to Friesian history, Dugin promoted the myth of the supposedly lost Palestinabuch, in which Wirth is said to have described the true history of the Jewish people. In 2007, one of his students provided a Russian translation of the Oera Linda Book with a detailed preface.

== Authorship ==
Among those who doubt the book's authenticity, the most popular candidates for the author of the manuscript are Cornelis Over de Linden or Eelco Verwijs. A recent third choice is the Protestant preacher François Haverschmidt (1835–1894), well known for writing poetry under the pseudonym Piet Paaltjens. Haverschmidt lived in Friesland and was an acquaintance of Verwijs.

Goffe Jensma (2004) argued that Haverschmidt was the main writer of the book, with the help of Over de Linden and Verwijs. According to Jensma, who would later become professor of Frisian language and literature at the University of Groningen, Haverschmidt intended the Oera Linda Book as a parody of the Christian Bible. An article in late 2007 by Jensma says that the three authors of the translation intended it "to be a temporary hoax to fool some nationalist Frisians and orthodox Christians and as an experiential exemplary exercise in reading the Holy Bible in a non-fundamentalist, symbolical way." Ignoring clues that it was a forgery, J. G. Ottema took it seriously, and it achieved popularity for the reasons given above. Its creators felt unable to admit that they had written it, and it became the foundation for new occult beliefs. Jensma concludes his article by saying "It is a perfect irony that a book written to unmask the Holy Bible as a book of human making was to become a bible itself."

== Contents ==
Themes running through the Oera Linda Book include catastrophism, nationalism, matriarchy, and mythology. The text alleges that Europe and other lands were, for a large part of their history, ruled by a succession of folk-mothers presiding over a hierarchical order of celibate priestesses dedicated to the goddess Frya, daughter of the creator god Wr-alda and Jrtha, the earth mother. The claim is also made that this Frisian civilization possessed an alphabet that was the ancestor of the Greek and Phoenician alphabets. Modern historiography is essentially ignored, particularly in the area of basic chronology of known events in the recent and distant past of Europe. Geographical evidence that was readily available at the time is also incorrectly reported.

The earliest portion of the Oera Linda Book, namely Frya's Tex, was supposedly composed in 2194 BC, whereas the most recent part, the letter of Hidde Oera Linda, claims to date to AD 1256. Almost half of the entire book comprises The Book of Adela's Followers, the original text around which the rest grew. It is purported to have been compiled in the 6th century BC from a mixture of contemporary writings and ancient inscriptions. The last two sections of the Oera Linda Book contain a number of lacunae and the book itself breaks off in mid-sentence.

It also describes a lost land called 'Atland' (the name given to Atlantis by the 17th-century scholar Olof Rudbeck), which was supposedly submerged in 2194 BC – the same year as 19th-century Dutch and Frisian almanacs, following traditional Biblical chronology, gave for Noah's flood.

=== Sections ===
The Oera Linda Book is divided into six sections, further subdivided into a total of 53 chapters.

- Letters
- The Book of Adela's Followers
- The Writings of Adelbrost and Apollonia
- The Writings of Frêthorik and Wiljow
- The Writing of Konerêd
- Fragments

== See also ==
- Book of Veles, a similar likely-forged document relevant to Slavic mythology
- Old High German lullaby, an Old High German lullaby mentioning Germanic deities that is also generally held to be a hoax
- Kensington Runestone, a runestone of supposedly Scandinavian origin found in the United States, considered a hoax by archaeologists and historians
- Germanic mythology, the historical pre-Christian beliefs of the ancient Germanic peoples
- Nehalennia
- Pseudohistory
- Fakelore
