= Reihengräber culture =

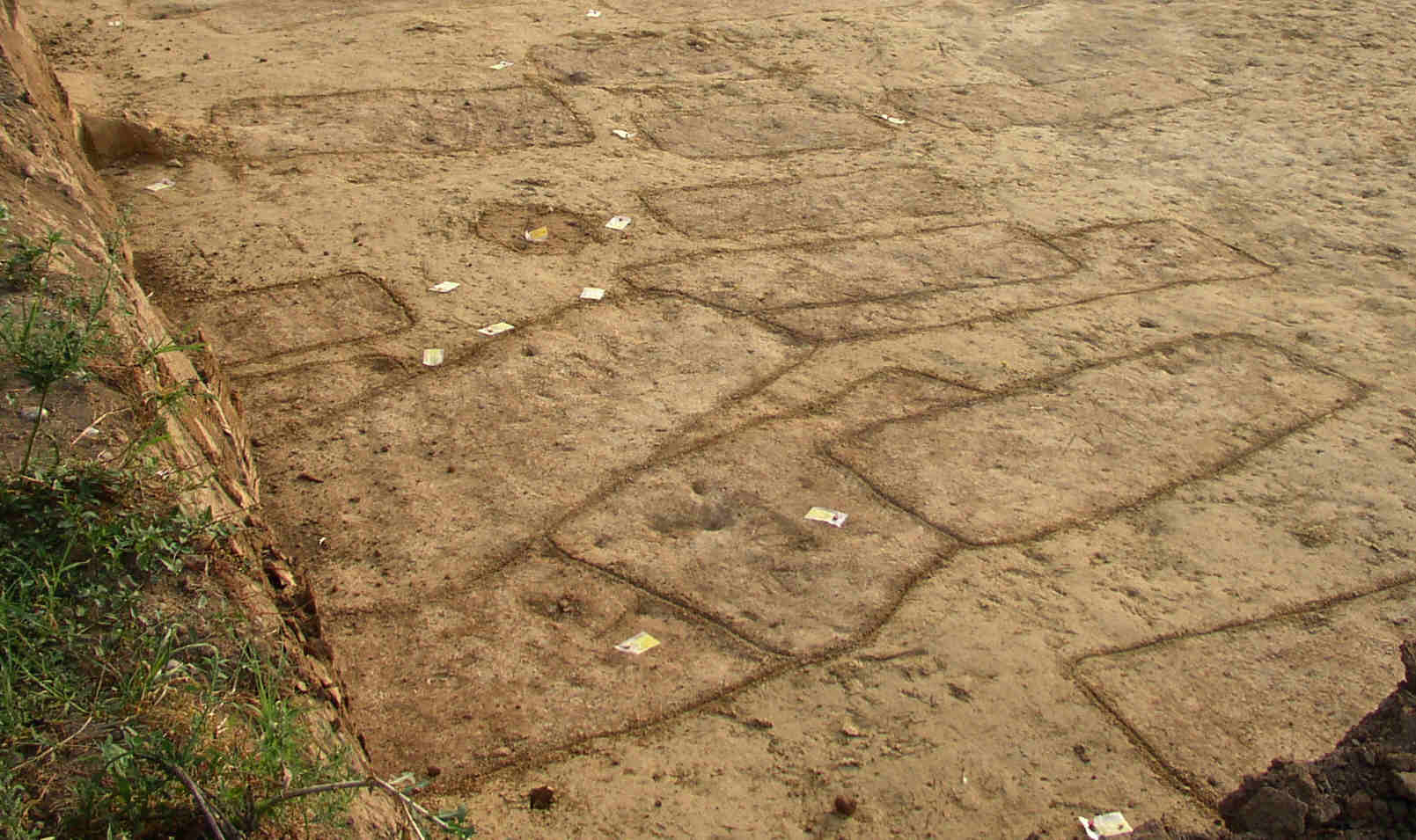
Excavation of Reihengräber close to Sasbach am Rhein, dating to the 6th/7th century CE

The Reihengräber culture (translated from German as Row grave culture) is an archaeological culture that refers to the burial practice of regularly arranged, identically oriented inhumation graves between the mid-fifth and early-eighth century in central and western Europe. Existing within the Merovingian sphere of influence, the Reihengräber culture was dominant in modern Belgium, northern France and the Rhineland.

The origins of the Reihengräber culture are unclear. Earlier scholars explained the diffusion of row graves in terms of Germanic or Frankish migration, but this is now generally refuted. More recently, scholars have argued that the burial custom was the product of a 'German-Roman mixed civilisation' that developed internally in Late Roman Gaul as a response to social instability with the collapse of the Roman Empire. According to this explanation, local elites were buried with lavish grave goods in order to signal their high social status.

Some scholars now argue that the concept of a row grave culture is obsolete and ought to be discarded altogether, since it wrongly suggests a Germanic ethnic connotation. Furthermore, the practice of burial in rows is so common throughout history that it is hardly specific enough to describe one archaeological culture. Finally, archaeologists now argue that the focus on row graves ignores the much larger variability in burial customs that were prevalent in the region in this period.

== Geographical context ==
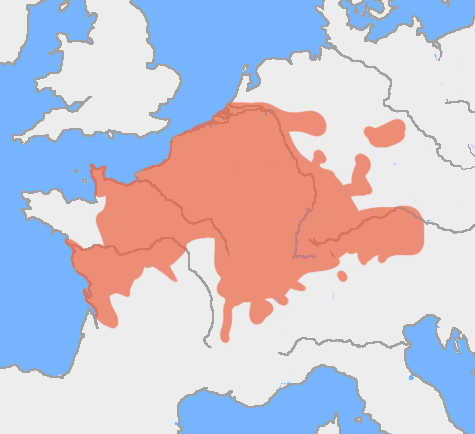
Distribution of the "Reihengräberzivilisation" c. 600 CE.

The Reihengräber culture, which developed within north-eastern Gaul under Romano-Germanic settlement during the fifth century, was located primarily between the Rhine and the Loire in the fifth century. It spread to the Germanic regions of Thuringia and Bavaria in the sixth century. Scholars have divided the Reihengräber culture into an eastern "Thuringian and Langobard" zone and a western "Bavarian and Alamanni" zone, based on the similar burial customs and material culture shared between these ethnic groups. Frankish populations were also present within these zones. Most Reihengräber sites in Germany are found on the River Danube or the River Main, with pockets of Frankish dominated settlements on the River Rhine. The eastern zone of the Reihengräber culture lies within the Thuringian Forest south of the Harz mountains, and extends eastward towards the River Elbe, where Slavic cultures settled on the eastern bank. The western Bavarian zone lies between the River Lech and River Enns. Both zones remained autonomous of Merovingian control until the mid-6th century, when Garibald I of Bavaria was installed as Duke in 555 A.D.

== Burial practices ==
The Reihengräber culture features the burial practice of evenly spaced rows. One of the main trends is the placement of funerary objects within graves, mainly weaponry for men, and jewelry for women. In addition, the Reihengräber culture is also known for the burial of horses, which while rare in the Bavarian zone, are common throughout burial sites in Gaul and Thuringia.

The Reihengräber culture is characterised by a great variety of burial practices, including different orientations of the graves, church burials, separate burials and even a continuing tradition of cremation. Mortuary practices changed rapidly between the fourth and eighth centuries, with the tradition of furnished burial largely disappearing from the late seventh century onwards.

=== Grave reopenings ===
The reopening of burial mounds and removal of grave goods shortly after burial is also a significant feature of Reihengräber culture burial customs. The reason for this practice is still debated among scholars, but it is commonly associated either with grave robbery or with ritual. Some scholars have compared it to Scandinavian practices associated with object animism. Here, this removal of burial objects, known as furta sacra, became especially common during the Carolingian dynasty during the 9th century, and was based on Harald Bluetooth's desecration of aristocratic burial mounds during his campaign in the Viken region. The usage of wetlands as predominant burial sites also runs parallels with Scandinavian practices.

Many of the removed objects may have been originally considered as inalienable property objects (see below).

== Material culture ==
The material culture of the Reihengräber reveals distinctions between male and female burial practices. Male graves typically contain swords, axes and belts, whereas female graves largely contained brooches, necklaces and girdle hangers. Bronze conical helmets in the Reihengräber culture are also prevalent, and are especially of note as they were offered as funerary objects within the late-Iron Age. Animistic designs occur extensively throughout Reihengräber material culture, in particular bird-like iconography and shapes of Thuringian bow brooches. Late fifth century Thuringian graves in modern Scherzheim also contained sets of Zierschlusselpaare, or symbolic keys pairs, uncommon artefacts whose ritual significance is yet unknown.

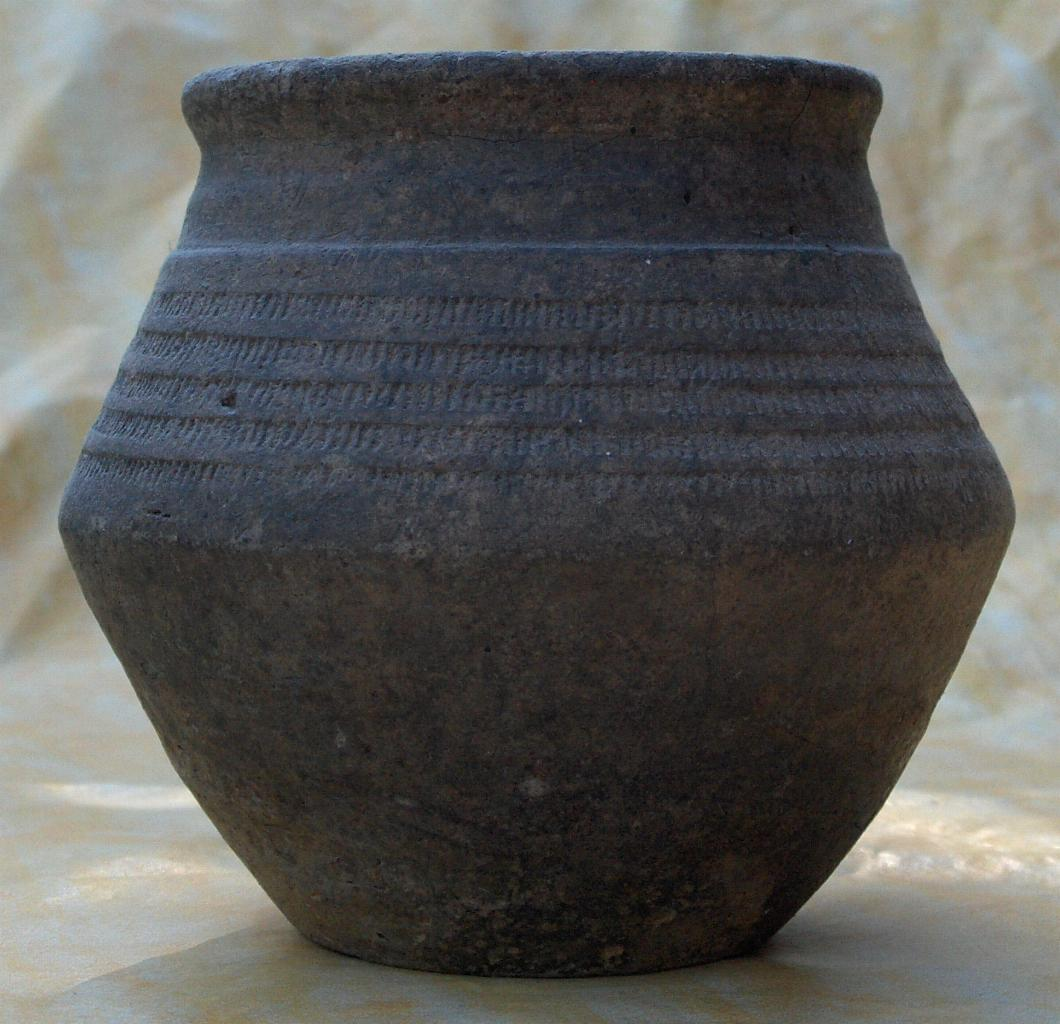
A Merovingian biconical pot from Rill, c. 620 CE

Another common item is the biconical pot, (German: Knickwandtopf, Dutch: knikwandpot, and French: vase biconique), the most important type of ceramics from the Merovingian period. The name is derived from the shape of the vessel, the form looking like two cones on top of each other. Often, the outside of the pot is decorated with stamps, impressions or lines. The distribution of the pottery shows that these vases originate from different ceramic production sites. Biconical pots are also found in settlements.

== Modern interpretations ==
=== Social status ===
Disparities in quality and prevalence of grave goods within the Reihengräber culture can be linked to a social overclass who represented local leadership and aristocracy. In Germany, Thuringian brooches give evidence to a cultural stratification between an elite and lower class, as they were developed on the commission of nobility and were almost exclusively found within he funerary sites of the entourages and personal attendants to these elites, who were mostly of Frankish descent. Despite clearly demarcated class differences between Frankish and Germanic peoples of the Reihengräber culture, the lower class of both ethnic groups show few differences in burial practices, with the cemetery at Zeuzblen in Schweinfurt revealing burials of both groups side by side in the classic row-graves style. All graves showed burial gifts crafted in the Thuringian make, and reveal that many Frankish commoners integrated the material culture with native Germanic populations in the Reihengräber region

=== Property rights ===
During the 1920s, archaeological investigation of the Reihengräber culture led to the debate among scholars whether the deposited funerary objects were seen as distinctly inalienable property that could not be inherited of sold. In this interpretation, inalienable property consisted of artefacts that could not be sold or exchanged due to their symbolic role as 'companion' objects to their original creators. These concepts were seen as integral to the Reihengräber culture's unique burial customs, and were instrumental in establishing the Merovingian concept of male property rights over weaponry in a custom known as hergewaete. Female property rights over household and jewellery, known as gerade, have also been identified. Although the concept is found in the later tenth century Germanic legal code of Sachsenspiegel, no contemporary sources exist to confirm this hypothesis. It is also contradicted by grave goods that had been passed down the generations before their final deposition in a grave. An alternative possibility could be that these goods represented collective inalienable goods.

=== Religion ===
Traditionally, the custom of furnished burial (with grave goods) was considered a pagan practice. This has now been disproven by the presence of furnished graves in Christian contexts (such as churches), or the deposition of Christian objects in a grave. Following the Christianisation of Merovingian Gaul, and hence the Reihengräber region, in the early 6th century, gold foil crosses also begin to appear in the archaeological record, appearing mostly around the French Alps and providing evidence for the Christianisation of the Reihengräber region during this period.

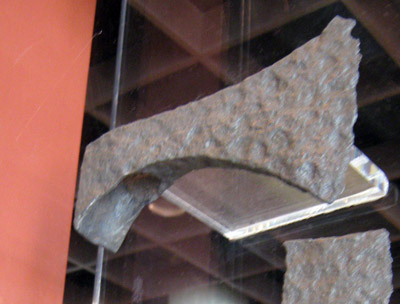
Fransica throwing axe on display in the Romano-Germanic Museum in Cologne, Germany

=== Ethnicity ===
The usefulness of the denomination of Frankish, Thuringian, Bavarian and other cultures as Reihengräber culture is debated within the archaeological scholarship. It is clear that these ethnic groups shares similar burial practices, especially considering the increasing prevalence of Frankish arms in connecting the Reihengräber region's military culture. Particularly, the Francisca battle-axes, traditionally considered as an ethnic marker of the Franks, have been located throughout the Reihengräber region in Thuringia, Almannia and Bavaria. Some scholars think that this is evidence of the adoption of Frankish warcraft in uniting the ethnic groups of the Reihengräber region. Others refute the possibility to read ethnicity from grave goods, including the francisca, altogether. The funerary customs show elements from both earlier 'Roman' and 'Germanic' traditions.

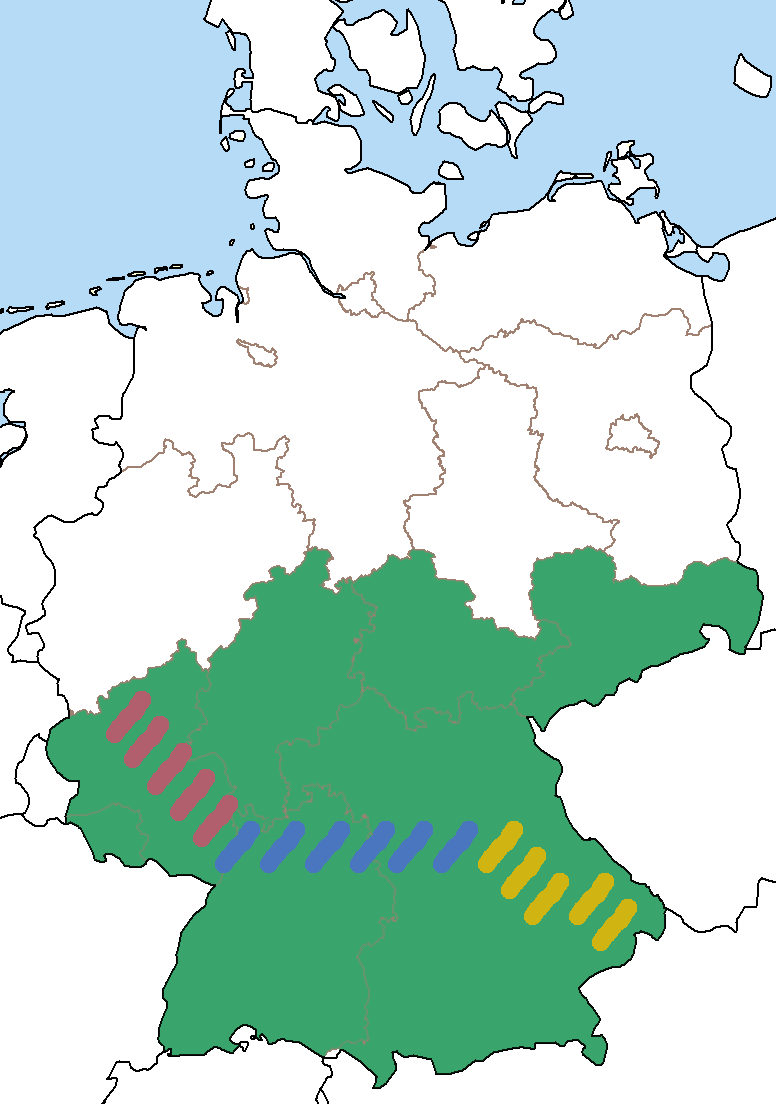
Settlement areas of the Reihengräber Culture in Germany (Green). Concentrated settlement areas on the River Rhine (Red), River Main (Blue) and River Danube (Yellow).

No single material culture unites the various communities pooled into the Reihengräber culture, as Frankish, Gothic and Thuringian artefact forms exist among many local styles throughout the region. Social mobility within the Merovingian period influenced the sharing of local customs, eventuating in an amalgamation of burial practices that led to the eventually spaced inhumation graves and grave good deposits that dominated the region in the mid-6th century. Ethnic groups seem to have also moved throughout the Reihengräber region constantly with permanent settlement largely matched by military control by dominant ethnic groups. The collapse of the Thuringian kingdoms between 531 and 534 resulted in large populations of Thuringian peoples emigrating from the region into Frankish territories in modern-France, leading to the introduction of Reihengräber burial practices and material culture into western Europe, though they remained a subordinate class to the Frankish overclass.
