= Kulturkreis =

Culture circle

The Kulturkreis (roughly, "culture circle" or "cultural field") school was a central idea of the early 20th-century German school of anthropology that sought to redirect the discipline away from the quest for an underlying, universal human nature toward a concern with the particular histories of individual societies. It was the notion of a culture complex as an entity that develops from a centre of origin and becomes diffused over large areas of the world.

== Origins ==
The theory was developed by the German ethnologists Fritz Graebner, the founder of the Vienna School of Ethnology, and Wilhelm Schmidt.

Frobenius was influenced by Richard Andree, and his own teacher Friedrich Ratzel.

These scholars believed that a limited number of Kulturkreise developed at different times and in different places and that all cultures, ancient and modern, resulted from the diffusion of cultural complexes—functionally related groups of culture traits— from these cultural centers. Proponents of this school believed that the history of any culture could be reconstructed through the analysis of its culture complexes and the tracing of their origins to one or more of the Kulturkreise.

"Building on the ideas of Andree, Ratzel, and his own teacher, H. Schurtz, Frobenius made a giant step through his two pioneering works "Der westafrikanische Kulturkreis" (1897) and "The Origin of African Civilizations" (1898a), which cleared the way for a new scientific approach in ethnology."

Arguing against the idea, then current, that "natural people" were remnants from the prehistoric era who could reveal the true nature of humanity, Kulturkreis scholars brought history back into the study of allegedly timeless peoples. They relied on diffusionist principles, believing that similarities among cultures could be shown to be the result of cultural influence, rather than the result of a universal human nature, and that circles of interaction among various peoples could and should be delineated by the professional anthropologist. In America, Clyde Kluckhohn of Harvard was known to have been influenced by the same Vienna Kulturkreis scholars as Fürer-Haimendorf, and indeed, Kluckhohn spent a year in Vienna while Fürer-Haimendorf was there.

== See also ==
- Cultural area
- Trans-cultural diffusion
- Totemism
