= Herman Wirth =

Dutch-German historian, Nazi and scholar (1885–1981)

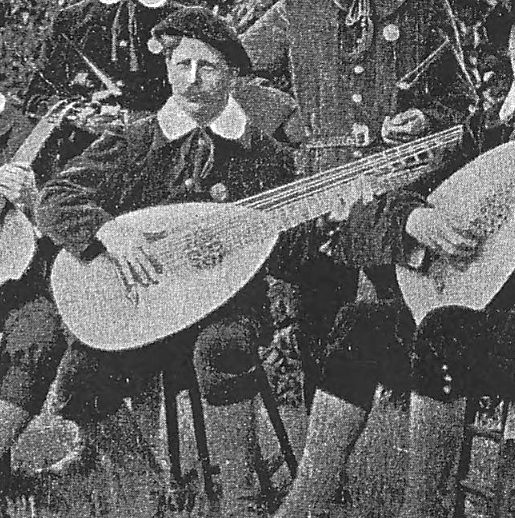
Wirth with his archlute as a member of the Dietsche Trekvogels, March 1920

Hermann Felix Wirth (also known as Herman Wirth Roeper Bosch or Herman Felix Wirth; 6 May 1885 – 16 February 1981) was a Dutch-German historian and scholar who specialised in studying music, ancient religions, myths and symbols. He was involved in founding the SS-organization Ahnenerbe but was later pushed out by Heinrich Himmler.

== Biography ==
=== Early life and career (1885–1925) ===
Born in Utrecht on 6 May 1885, Wirth studied Dutch philology, literature, history and musicology at Utrecht and Leipzig, receiving his doctorate in 1911 from the University of Basel with a dissertation on the demise of the Dutch folk song. He taught Dutch language at the University of Berlin from 1909 to 1914.

When World War I broke out in 1914, Wirth volunteered for military service in the Imperial German Army, where he was assigned to monitor the Flemish separatists in German-occupied Belgium. In 1916 he was decorated, dismissed from service, and subsequently appointed by Kaiser Wilhelm II as a senior lecturer (Titularprofessor). In 1918 he became professor at the Royal Conservatory of Brussels. After the war ended in November 1918, he and his wife moved to the Netherlands, where they founded a nationalist Wandervogel-organization, dedicated to traditional folk-music. By then, Wirth had accepted a temporary job as a teacher at the gymnasium in Baarn.

In August 1922 he became an honorary professor at the University of Marburg, Germany, but he took another job as a teacher in Sneek, Netherlands until February 1924. This gave him the opportunity to research Frisian folklore and the history of the apparently age-old Oera Linda Book (actually a 19th-century hoax).

=== Nazi Party membership (1925–1939) ===
In 1925, Wirth joined the Nazi Party. In 1928, he published a book about the "Prehistory of the Atlantic Nordic race" (German: Der Aufgang der Menschheit: Untersuchungen zur Geschichte der Religion, Symbolik und Schrift der atlantisch-nordischen Rasse), which gained resonance in völkisch circles.In October 1932, he attempted to set up a research institute —the Forschungsinstitut für Urgeschichte— in Bad Doberan, associated with a professorship at Rostock university, supported by the NSDAP state government of Mecklenburg-Schwerin. Headed by Wirth, the institute became extremely controversial in professional circles, as well as among noted Nazi intellectuals. Due to a lack of funds and Wirth's expensive way of life, the institute folded within a year. The Hermann-Wirth-Gesellschaft, founded in 1928, also suffered.

After the Nazis' rise to power in 1933, Wirth rejoined the Nazi party in 1934 and shortly thereafter became a member of the Schutzstaffel (SS membership number 258,776). He was re-awarded his former NSDAP number (20,151) personally by Adolf Hitler.

In early summer 1933, friends within the NSDAP helped Wirth to be appointed to an extraordinary professorship without teaching responsibilities at the theological faculty of Berlin University. He negotiated with the Prussian Ministry of Education about the establishment of an open-air museum (Deutsches Ahnenerbe) near Berlin. Wirth also re-founded his organization as Gesellschaft für germanische Ur- und Vorgeschichte, with assistance from the journalist and Nazi functionary Johann von Leers and the industrialist Ludwig Roselius. The latter had supported Wirth since the 1920s and paid for the publication of Der Aufgang der Menschheit.

Between 1933 and 1935 a major philosophical clash, encouraged by the Nazi party, pitted the churches against neo-paganism supported by völkisch theories. Wirth was among those who tried to reinterpret Christianity in terms of an ethnic Nordic origin of original monotheism. The free-thinking neo-pagans founded a supporting group in July 1933; they included Wirth, Jakob Wilhelm Hauer, and (until 1934) Ernst Bergmann and numerous ex-Communists.

In 1934 Wirth advanced plans to set up an organization called Deutsches Ahnenerbe e.V., which was intended to host and exhibit his collection. Although he was supported by Roselius, the Verein was seemingly never established. However, von Leers had brought Wirth into contact with Heinrich Himmler and Richard Walther Darré, who showed interest in Wirth's ideas. In 1935 —sponsored by Himmler and Darré— Wirth co-founded and then headed the Ahnenerbe, whose goal was to "research German ancestral heritage". The organisation was part of the structure of the SS. In 1937, Himmler restructured the Ahnenerbe, made Wirth the "Honorary President" (German: Ehrenpräsident) with no real powers, and replaced him as President by Walter Wüst. In 1938, Wirth also lost his department within the Ahnenerbe, and in 1939 he lost his position as Ehrenpräsident.

Wirth continued his research, repeatedly financed by Himmler, as both men kept in touch. Wirth remained an SS-officer, but —despite having Himmler's support— had a hard time in finding a new job at Marburg University.

=== Post-World War II (1945–1981) ===
Captured in 1945 by the U.S. Army, Wirth was detained and interviewed for two years. Feeling unwelcome in the Netherlands, he then moved to Sweden, before returning to Marburg in 1954, where he worked as a private scholar.

Although he continued to defend Nazi principles, Wirth's teachings about "Urkulturen" (original cultures) found resonance in the evolving alternative scene, and in the 1970s gained support from North American native groups. In the late 1970s, politicians in Rhineland-Palatinate —including the state government and delegates from Kusel— supported a project to set up a museum to exhibit Wirth's ethnographic collection in the tithe barn of Lichtenberg Castle. When journals began to write about his Ahnenerbe past, the project was aborted.

The influential Chilean neo-Nazi Miguel Serrano interviewed Wirth in September 1979. According to Serrano, Wirth complained to him that his magnum opus Palestinabuch had recently been stolen. There are, indeed, indications that Wirth had worked between 1933 and 1969 on an anti-semitic text, which would serve as a counterpart to the Ura Linda Chronicle. Since then, due to the publications of Serrano and the Russian philosopher Aleksandr Dugin, the idea of a lost major manuscript has gained cult status in extreme right-wing circles.

On 16 February 1981, Wirth died in Kusel, Germany.

== Philosophy ==
Wirth claimed that civilization is a curse that only a simpler way of life, as documented in archaeological findings and historical records, could lift. He has been criticized for romantic nationalism and Germanomania. He was also criticized by German scholars of his time, like Bolko von Richthofen, Gerhard Gloege, Arthur Hübner and Karl Hermann Jacob-Friesen, for "gullibly refusing to accept" the evidence that proved Ura Linda chronicle (a 6th–1st century BC chronicle of a Frisian family that he translated) a forgery.

Wirth placed the origins of European civilization on the mythological island of Atlantis, which he thought had been located in the North Atlantic, connecting North America and Europe. Its inhabitants supposedly were pure Aryans, influencing the cultures not just of Europeans but also of the natives of North America and the wider "Old World" beyond Europe. According to Wirth, these Atlanteans worshipped a single deity whose aspect changed with the seasons and its son, the Heilsbringer. In their religion, priestesses played a key role. Wirth thought that both the Jewish and the Christian faith were perversions of this original religion. He considered himself a symbologist and thought the Germanic people to be direct descendants of these inhabitants of Atlantis. Researching the Germanic culture thus was a way of reconstructing the original culture of the ancients. All of this research was considered explicitly political as well as religious. Wirth identified the Sadlermiut eskimos, recently having gone extinct, as remnants of a long-past Thulean high civilization.

Wirth's ideas inspired the design of Haus Atlantis in the Böttcherstraße in Bremen. This was referred to in a speech by Hitler at the 1936 Reichsparteitag, in which he denounced the "Böttcher-Straßen-Kultur".

== Influence ==
Wirth's ideas about the origin of the "Aryan (white) race" from the Arctic were borrowed by the Italian esoteric and neo-fascist ideologue Julius Evola.

According to the scholar of religion Roman Shizhensky, in the early 1990s, the dissident Alexey Dobrovolsky ("volkhv" Dobroslav), one of the founders of Russian neopaganism, borrowed the idea of the swastika from Wirth’s work "The Chronicle of Oera Linda" ("Die Ura-Linda-Chronik", 1933). In 1996, Dobrovolsky declared a modified swastika, the eight-rayed "Kolovrat", supposedly a pagan sign of the Sun, as the symbol of the uncompromising "national liberation struggle" against the "Zhyd yoke". This swastika has become the main symbol of Russian neopagans.

== Written works ==
- Der Aufgang der Menschheit (Accession of Mankind), 1928
- Die Heilige Urschrift der Menschheit, 1931-1936
- Die Ura Linda Chronik (Ura Linda chronicle), editor, 1933
