= Erika Trautmann =

German archaeologist and illustrator

Erika Trautmann-Nehring (1897–1968) was a German archaeologist and illustrator, most noted for her work with Franz Altheim on the petroglyphs of Val Camonica, Italy.

== Biography ==
Trautmann was born to a wealthy family in Kreis Konitz, West Prussia.

After World War I Konitz was annexed by Poland and the family's estates were confiscated. Moving to Berlin, she trained as an illustrator at the Lettehaus and the Berlin University of the Arts. In 1925 she married Bernhard Trautmann, a civil engineer.

In 1933 she got a job at as an illustrator at the Forschungsinstitut fur Kulturmorphologie, led by Leo Frobenius, in Frankfurt. In 1934 she documented parietal art in Spain and France. In 1936, while illustrating the petroglyphs in Val Camonica, she met and fell in love with Franz Altheim, a Professor of Classical Philology at the University of Frankfurt.

Trautmann and Altheim published a number of books on history, runes and petroglyphs, and the migration of Indo-Germanic peoples.

They joined the Ahnenerbe and received funding for more research at Val Camonica and in the Middle East where they also acted as agents for the Nazi intelligence service. In 1940 Trautmann tried to get Ahnenerbe funding for an expedition to Brittany to study the megalithic monuments there, but was turned down in favor of a male researcher, Herbert Jankuhn.

After World War II Trautmann's work for the Ahnenerbe prevented her from continuing her academic career.

She co-authored, illustrated, or provided photos for a number of books, with Altheim and others, in the years surrounding World War II.

== Publications ==
- Altheim, Franz; Trautmann, Erika (1938). Vom Ursprung der Runen. Ahnenerbe.
- Altheim, Franz; Trautmann-Nehring, Erika (1939). Die Soldatenkaiser. Frankfurt/Main: Klostermann.
- Altheim, Franz; Trautmann-Nehring, E (1940). Italien und die dorische Wanderung. Amsterdam: Pantheon. OCLC 503893702.
- Altheim, Franz; Trautmann-Nehring, E (1941). Italien und Rom. Pantheon Akademische Verlagsanstalt. OCLC 1438703.
- Altheim, Franz; Trautmann, Erika (1942). Kimbern und Runen : Untersuchungen zur Ursprungsfrage der Runen. Berlin: Ahnenerbe-Stiftung Verlag. OCLC 20679268.
- Altheim, Franz; Trautmann, Erika (1943). Die krise der alten welt im 3. jahrhundert n. zw. und ihre ursachen. Berlin-Dahlem: Ahnenerbe-stiftung.
- Altheim, Franz; Trautmann-Nehring, E (1943). Götter und Kaiser. Berlin-Dahlem: Ahnenerbe-Stiftung. OCLC 79042936.
- Altheim, Franz; Trautmann-Nehring, Erika (1947). Weltgeschichte Asiens im griechischen Zeitalter. Halle: M. Niemeyer. OCLC 490304425.
- Altheim, Franz; Trautmann-Nehring, Erika (1947). Die Felsbilder der Val Camonica, Bild und Forschung, Abteilung Altertumswissenschaft 1-2. Berlin: Transmare Photo. OCLC 901862964.
- Trautmann-Nehring, Erika; Altheim, Franz (1951). Aus Spätantike und Christentum. M. Niemeyer. ISBN 9783112055847.
- Altheim, Franz; Trautmann-Nehring, Erika (1951). Attila und die Hunnen. Baden-Baden: Verl. f. Kunst- u. Wissenschaft. OCLC 250563844.
- Altheim, Franz; Stiehl, Ruth; Trautmann-Nehring, Erika; Göbl, Robert (1954). Ein asiatischer Staat : Feudalismus unter den Sasaniden und ihren Nachbarn. Erster Band. Wiesbaden: Limes. OCLC 490933883.
- Altheim, Franz; Haussig, Hans Wilhelm; Altheim-Stiehl, Ruth; Göbl, Robert; Trautmann-Nehring, Erika (1957). Finanzgeschichte der Spätantike. Frankfurt/Main: Klostermann. OCLC 600746273.

== Bibliography ==
- Reena Perschke: Die Felsbildforscherin Erika Trautmann-Nehring (1897-1968), in: Sonja Häder/Ulrich Wiegmann (Ed.): An der Seite gelehrter Männer. Frauen zwischen Emanzipation und Tradition, Klinkhardt 2017, pp. 225–269, ISBN 978-3-7815-2205-3.
- Reena Perschke: National-Socialist Researchers in Val Camonica - A short biography of the petroglyph draughtswoman Erika Trautmann-Nehring (1897-1968), Bollettino del Centro Camuno di Studi Preistorici (BCSP), vol. 43, 2019, pp. 5-31.

== See also ==
- Rock Drawings in Valcamonica
