= Fritz Graebner =

German geographer and ethnologist (1877–1934)

Robert Fritz Graebner (4 March 1877, Berlin – 13 July 1934, Berlin) was a German geographer and ethnologist best known for his development of the theory of Kulturkreis, or culture circle. He was the first theoretician of the Vienna School of Ethnology.

Graebner advanced a theory of diffusion of culture (Kulturkreise) which became the basis of a culture-historical approach to ethnology. His theories had influence for a time in the field of ethnology, and were also propounded by Franz Boas, Clark Wissler and Paul Kirchhoff. He also induced the concept of "primeval culture".

He was in Australia attending an anthropological conference when World War I broke out in 1914, and due to accusations of having hidden certain sensitive documents he was not allowed to leave Australia for the duration of the war. He is known for identifying six primeval culture complexes in the Oceania region, given in his book "Ethnologie": Tasmanian culture, Old Australian boomerang culture, Totemic hunter culture, Moiety complex (two class horticulturists culture), Melenesian bow culture, and Polynesian patrilineal culture.

== Publications ==
- Methode der Ethnologie (Method of Ethnology), 1911
- Das Weltbild der Primitiven (The World View of the Primitives), 1924
