= Hans Hahne =

Hans Hahne is the name of:

- Hans Hahne (archaeologist) (1875–1935), German medical doctor and archaeologist
- Hans Hahne (general) (1894–1944), German general
