= Deutsche Gesellschaft für Vorgeschichte =

The Deutsche Gesellschaft für Vorgeschichte (DGV) (German Society for Prehistory) was a society founded in 1909 by Gustaf Kossinna with the participation of Hans Hahne, Wilhelm Ohnesorge and others. The organization was committed to national prehistory and early history research and to providing a broad basis for German Archeology as a discipline with a historical goal. In its first year the first edition of the magazine Mannus was published. In 1913, at a special general meeting, the change of name to Gesellschaft für Deutschen Vorgeschichte (GDV) was approved by a large majority. After Kossinna's death, Alfred Götze initially took over the leadership of the society. In 1933, in the course of Gleichschaltung, the board decided to "expand" itself to the Reichsbund für Deutsche Vorgeschichte at the request of Hans Reinerth. This decision was confirmed a year later by the General Assembly. Also in 1934 Reinerth became leader (Bundesführer) of the Reichsbund.

In 1968, the society was re-founded as the Gesellschaft für Vor- und Frühgeschichte (Bonn) by Bolko von Richthofen. He again published a periodical called Mannus. The members, who are mainly associated with right to far-right extremist views, included, among others the "Atlantis Researchers" Jürgen Spanuth, Herman Wirth, and Haye W. Hansen. "Mannus" was discontinued in 1994 after 24 issues.
