= Schloss Johannesburg =

Schloss Johannesburg (Castle Johannesburg) or variant, may refer to:

- Schloss Johannesberg a.k.a. Jánský vrch, a German castle in Czech Silesia
- Schloss Johannisburg, a castle in Aschaffenburg, Germany
- Schloss Johannisberg, a castle in Hesse, Germany
- Johannisborg, a castle in Sweden, see List of castles and manor houses in Sweden
  - the remains of Johannisborg, see Listed buildings in Östergötland County

== See also ==
- Johannesburg (disambiguation)
