= Johannisberg =

Johannisberg may refer to places:

== Austria ==
- Johannisberg (High Tauern), a mountain in the Austrian High Tauern

== Germany ==
- Johannisberg (Geisenheim), part of Geisenheim in Rheingau-Taunus-Kreis in Hesse
  - Schloss Johannisberg, a winery
- Johannisberg, a part of Oberviechtach in Landkreis Schwandorf in Bavaria
- Johannisberg, a part of Penzberg in Landkreis Weilheim-Schongau in Bavaria
- Johannisberg, a village in the municipality of Windhagen in Rhineland-Palatinate
- Johannisberg, a village in the municipality of Gammelby in Kreis Rendsburg-Eckernförde in Schleswig-Holstein
- Johannisberg (Jena-Lobeda), a prominent ridge of the Wöllmisse

== See also ==
- Silvaner, a variety of wine called Johannisberger in Switzerland
- Johannesburg (disambiguation)
- Johannesberg (disambiguation)
- Johannisburg (disambiguation)
