= Gotthard Neumann =

German prehistorian (1902–1972)

Gotthard Arno Ernst Neumann
- Born: 8 June 1902
- Died: 29 April 1972 (aged 69)

Gotthard Arno Ernst Neumann (8 June 1902 – 29 April 1972) was a German prehistorian. Born in Schwabsdorf, Grand Duchy of Saxe-Weimar-Eisenach, he served as a professor of prehistory and early history at the University of Jena from 1934 to 1941 and from 1953 to 1967. Neumann played a major role in the development of prehistory and early history research, as well as archaeological monument preservation, in Thuringia. He died in Jena.

== Education, studies, and first professional experience ==
Gotthard Arno Ernst Neumann was born on 8 June 1902 in Schwabsdorf, now part of the Weimarer Land district in Thuringia. After attending school in Apolda and Jena, he studied four semesters at the University of Jena under Gustav Eichhorn and Wilhelm Dörpfeld, one semester at the Ludwig-Maximilians-Universität München, and six semesters at Marburg University from 1921, specializing in prehistory, history, and German studies (particularly Germanic religious history). During his studies, he joined the Sängerschaft zu St. Pauli Jena (St. Pauli Jena Singing Society). Neumann also studied classical archaeology, art history, diluvial geology, anthropology, philosophy, church history, and historical auxiliary sciences.

As a schoolboy, Neumann participated in excavations at the Municipal Museum of Prehistory in Weimar under Armin Möller. As a student, he worked under Walther Bremer in archaeological conservation in Hesse and joined one of the first large-scale excavations in Germany on the Goldberg near Nördlingen under Gerhard Bersu. In 1926, he earned his doctorate under Gustav Behrens (replacing the late Walther Bremer) with a thesis on Die Aunjetitzer Kultur in Mitteldeutschland (The Aunjetitz Culture in Central Germany).

In 1927, Neumann became a scientific assistant at the State Museum of Mineralogy, Geology, and Prehistory in Dresden. In Saxony, he conducted several modern excavations, primarily at large Bronze Age burial grounds, including those in Leuben and the Slavic hill fort 'Alte Schanze' in Köllmichen near Mutzschen. In 1930, to promote public education, he created an archaeological open-air museum in Gävernitz near Priestewitz, featuring a reconstruction of two Late Bronze Age burial mounds after their excavation. From the summer semester of 1929, Neumann taught prehistory courses as an assistant at the Institute of Mineralogy and Geology under Eberhard Rimann at the Technical University of Dresden.

== Neumann as director of the Germanisches Museum and professor in Jena (1930–1945) ==
In 1930, Neumann accepted an appointment from Wilhelm Frick, the first National Socialist Thuringian Minister, and became director of the Germanisches Museum at the University Institute for Prehistory and Early History in Jena. He continued teaching as a volunteer assistant in the History Department under his former teacher, Alexander Cartellieri. In 1932, the Thuringian Ministry of Education appointed him an honorary representative for cultural and historical monuments under the Thuringian Excavation Act of 1 July 1932. In 1934, he was named State Representative for Prehistoric and Early Historical Antiquities in Thuringia.

Under Neumann's direction, with student assistance and support from the Reich Labour Service, major archaeological research and rescue excavations were conducted. These included the Late Palaeolithic open-air settlement at Oelknitz, a district of Rothenstein, in 1932: Late Bronze Age cremation graves and an early medieval row grave field in Zöllnitz in 1933 and 1936: the medieval moated castle of Kapellendorf in 1933, the medieval tower hill fort of Jenalöbnitz in 1934: the medieval Reichsburg Kyffhausen from 1934 to 1938: Camburg Castle in 1935: six Corded Ware burial mounds in Lucka-Breitenhain in 1935–1936 and 1941–1942: an Early Neolithic burial mound in Stobra in 1935–1936: an urn burial ground from the early Iron Age and an early medieval row burial ground in Dreitzsch in 1936: Band Ceramic burials, as well as settlement pits and burials from the Aunjetitz culture, in Arnstadt in 1937: and Bronze Age burial mounds in Willmanns in 1940, among others. These excavations, modern for their time, provided significant insights, with findings that remain largely valid today.

In 1934, Thuringia's Reich Governor, Fritz Sauckel, appointed Neumann an extraordinary professor of prehistory at the University of Jena without prior qualification. At age 32, he was among the youngest prehistory professors in Germany, though such appointments were not uncommon due to the subject's recent institutionalization at universities. In 1935, Neumann became honorary curator of the Municipal Museum of Prehistory in Weimar, and in 1937, he was appointed a full member of the Thuringian Historical Commission.

In January 1941, Neumann was drafted into the Wehrmacht and served as a sergeant (Feldwebel) in an intelligence unit during World War II. His involvement in so-called "looting raids," particularly during his deployment in Ukraine, remains unclear. Neumann claimed participation in the "Special Pre-History Unit" of the Taskforce Reichsleiter Rosenberg (ERR) but stated he held no leadership role.

Despite attempts by Jena rectors Abraham Esau (1939) and Karl Astel (1944) to appoint Neumann as a full professor, these efforts failed. In February 1945, the Reich Ministry of Science, Education, and National Education appointed him Ordinarius, but this appointment did not take effect due to the war's end.

== Activities and memberships in organizations during the Third Reich ==
Gotthard Neumann came from a Christian conservative background. Like his father, Dr. Phil. Arno Neumann (died 1926), a Protestant pastor in Schwabsdorf near Weimar, later director of the Realgymnasium in Weimar, and a member of the state parliament for the German People's Party (DVP) from 1920 to 1924, he was initially nationally liberal in his views. However, according to his account, in the early 1930s, "under the influence of events in his homeland," he turned away from liberal views toward the NSDAP. Neumann, deeply committed to prehistory, shared the high hopes that many prehistorians associated with Adolf Hitler. His senior roles in professional associations reflected an effort to promote prehistory research rather than a strong commitment to the NSDAP or its organizations.

A long-standing member of the Society for German Prehistory (since 1919), Neumann joined the Reichsbund für Deutsche Vorgeschichte (Reich Association for German Prehistory) in 1934. In 1933, he was appointed regional director for Thuringia by Hans Reinerth and named to the extended advisory board. That same year, he joined Alfred Rosenberg's Kampfbund für deutsche Kultur (Fighting League for German Culture) and became head of the Prehistory Section in Jena, a role that soon merged with his position in the Reichsbund. From 1933 until his conscription in 1941, Neumann was a member of the National Socialist Teachers' League (NSLB) and, from 1938, served as a district clerk for prehistory. From 1933, he delivered numerous lectures at state schools in Egendorf and Blankenhain, as well as for the SS, SA, NSDAP, Hitler Youth, BDM, Reich Labour Service, and State Farmers' Association. He also organized exhibitions, guided tours, and educational walks to "familiarize thousands of older and younger members of the national community with the ideological content of prehistory."

In April 1934, Neumann became a supporting member of the SS. He claimed to be a candidate for NSDAP membership from 1937 to 1941, though it remains unclear whether his membership was approved. His initial enthusiasm for the regime waned, and archival evidence suggests an increasingly strained relationship with the NSDAP and SS. During denazification in 1947, Neumann defended himself, stating: "My position as a university professor, though I only sought to administer a strictly scientific office, was in serious jeopardy. If I did not want to lose my job and authority, I had to agree to join the NSDAP." He cited conflicts, many verified by other sources, including disputes with SS leadership over responsibilities and ethnic interpretations of findings during excavations at Reichsburg Kyffhausen (1934–1938) and attacks on him and his students Heinrich Rempel and Erwin Schirmer for their research on Slavic archaeology. Some tensions may also stem from Neumann's "unwavering commitment to the Protestant Church." As director of the Germanisches Museum, he forwarded denunciations against his taxidermist, Georg Sorm, to the Thuringian Ministry of Education. Sorm was convicted in 1937, imprisoned, and dismissed, later becoming a "social case."

== Work at the University of Jena during the Soviet occupation and the German Democratic Republic ==
After the surrender of the Wehrmacht on 8 May 1945 and a period in American captivity, Gotthard Neumann returned to Jena in June 1945 and immediately began reorganizing the Institute for Prehistoric Archaeology. In mid-September, he facilitated connections between the Anti-Fascist Student Committee and the teaching staff. Under the Soviet Military Administration in Thuringia (SMATh), Neumann was initially confirmed as a scientist in November 1945. However, on 15 December 1945, he and his assistant, Dr. Heinrich Rempel, were dismissed from service due to Neumann's NSDAP membership, despite efforts by state president Rudolf Paul and university members to retain him. In December 1945, Neumann joined the LDP. In later years, he adopted a largely passive stance toward society but remained active in the Protestant Church in Thuringia as a synod member.

Initially working as a freelance writer and odd-jobber, Neumann returned to the Prehistoric Museum at the University of Jena in 1947 as a preparator. In 1950, he became a research assistant and, in 1953, a senior research assistant. That same year, he was appointed professor with full teaching responsibilities for prehistory and early history and director of the Prehistoric Museum at the University of Jena. In 1956, he was appointed professor with a chair. In these roles, he led the Department of Prehistory and Early History and served on the scientific advisory board of the State Secretariat for Higher and Technical Education in the GDR. Neumann retired in 1967. The closure of his institute and museum, along with the relocation of the collection following the GDR's Third Higher Education Reform in 1968, was a significant blow. Neumann died in Jena on 29 April 1972.

His excavations between 1953 and 1967 included notable projects: the research excavation of the medieval deserted village of Gumprechtsdorf in the former state forest of Klosterlausnitz from 1952 to 1953: urban archaeological investigations in Jena from 1953 to 1956 (St. Michael's Church, Paulinerkloster, and Jenergasse): the excavation of a flat grave field in Einhausen in 1954: early Iron Age burial mounds in Harras from 1955 to 1956: Bronze Age and early medieval castle ramparts on the Johannisberg near Jena-Lobeda in 1957 and 1959: and a rescue excavation of a Corded Ware burial mound in Dornburg in 1960. In his final years, Neumann focused almost exclusively on medieval archaeology, investigating the medieval castle complex in Gerstungen in 1960, the Nikolaikirche in Oberndorf near Arnstadt in 1962, the Schillerkirche in Jena-Ost in 1963, and the medieval castle and Benedictine monastery on Petersberg in Saalfeld in 1964.

Neumann was elected a corresponding member of the German Archaeological Institute (DAI) in 1953 and a full member in 1956. He was also a member of the Prehistory and Early History Section of the German Academy of Sciences in Berlin (1952), the Saxon Academy of Sciences in Leipzig (1964), and the Berlin Society for Anthropology, Ethnology, and Prehistory.

== Impact on archaeology and heritage preservation in Thuringia ==
In the 1930s, Gotthard Neumann revolutionized prehistoric and early historical research and archaeological monument preservation in Thuringia. He played a key role in drafting new excavation laws in 1932 and 1933, initiated the reorganization of prehistoric collections in major Thuringian museums, such as those in Gera and Gotha, and transformed the state-run archaeological heritage preservation service from the University Institute in Jena into a state agency. Between 1930 and 1944, Neumann conducted numerous significant excavations and emergency salvage operations in non-Prussian parts of Thuringia. His investigations of medieval castles, churches, towns, and deserted villages established him as a pioneer of medieval archaeology. To disseminate his and his students' research to both academic and public audiences, Neumann published the journal Der Spatenforscher (1936–1943) and the prehistoric yearbook Irmin of the Germanisches Museum at the University of Jena (1939–1942).

An analysis of his writings shows that, with few exceptions, Neumann maintained scientific rigour in presenting his findings during the Nazi era, prioritizing objectivity over the ideologization of prehistory and early history. He consistently rejected notions of cultural superiority, particularly claims of Germanic dominance. In public, he provocatively highlighted the "strongest Celtic cultural influence" on the Germanic peoples during the La Tène period and dismissed ethnic nationalist sentiments and "Germanomania." Through excavations, lectures, presentations, and publications, he frequently engaged with the Slavs in the German region, recognizing their distinct culture and contributions to German history.

After 1945, Neumann resumed teaching after a brief interruption and continued his excavations and research in Thuringia. However, he gradually ceded leadership of his institute to what is now the Thuringian State Office for the Preservation of Historical Monuments and Archaeology in Weimar. Following the death of Alfred Götze, Neumann fulfilled Götze's wish by taking over research at the Steinsburg near Römhild, furthering his studies of prehistoric, early historical, and medieval castle complexes. His excavations, lectures, and scientific papers spanned nearly the entire spectrum of Thuringian prehistory. These works, grounded in meticulous archaeological research, are primarily descriptive and comparative, offering enduring value for prehistory and early history research, particularly in central Germany.

== Publications ==
- Neumann, Gotthard (1929). "Die Gliederung der Glockenbecherkultur in Mitteldeutschland" [The Structure of the Bell Beaker Culture in Central Germany]. Praehistorische Zeitschrift (in German). 20 (1–2). Berlin: de Gruyter: 3–69. doi:10.1515/prhz.1929.20.1-2.3. ISSN 0079-4848.
- Neumann, Gotthard (1929). "Die Entwicklung der Aunjetitzer Keramik in Mitteldeutschland" [The Development of Aunjetitz Pottery in Central Germany]. Praehistorische Zeitschrift (in German). 20 (1–2). Berlin: de Gruyter: 70–144. doi:10.1515/prhz.1929.20.1-2.70. ISSN 0079-4848.
- Neumann, Gotthard (1930). "Berichte aus dem Museum für Mineralogie, Geologie und Vorgeschichte in Dresden. Vorgeschichtliche Reihe". Das Großgrab von Gävernitz, Kreisverwaltung Großenhain, Sachsen [The Great Grave of Gävernitz, Großenhain District Administration, Saxony] (in German). Vol. 13.
- Neumann, Gotthard (1938). "Die Vor- und Frühgeschichte Mitteldeutschlands" [The Prehistory and Early History of Central Germany]. Die Thüringer Fahne (in German). 7. Jena: Neuenhahn: 362–369.
- Neumann, Gotthard (1954). "Frühe Burgen und Städte. Beiträge zur Burgen- und Stadtkernforschung. Festschrift Wilhelm Unverzagt". Sieben Gleichberg-Burgen nach dem Stand der Forschung 1952 [Seven Gleichberg Castles According to the State of Research in 1952] (in German). Vol. 2. Berlin: Deutsche Akademie der Wissenschaften. pp. 7–16.
- Neumann, Gotthard (1958). "Mehrere kurze Übersichten über verschiedene vor- und frühgeschichtliche Kulturen" [Several Brief Overviews of Various Prehistoric and Early Historical Cultures]. Ausgrabungen und Funde (in German). 3. Berlin: Akademie-Verlag. ISSN 0004-8127.
- Neumann, Gotthard (1973). "Die Fibeln von den Kleinen Gleichbergen bei Römhild" [The Primers from the Kleiner Gleichberge near Römhild]. Sitzungsberichte der Sächsischen Akademie der Wissenschaften zu Leipzig, Philologisch-Historische Klasse (in German). 64 (3). Leipzig: Sächsische Akademie der Wissenschaften. ISSN 0080-5297.
