= Johannesburg (disambiguation) =

Johannesburg is the largest city in South Africa.

Johannesburg may also refer to:

== Places in the United States ==
- Johannesburg, California
- Johannesburg, Michigan
- Johannesburg, Wisconsin
- Johannesburg Mountain, Washington

== Music ==
- Johannesburg (EP), a 2016 EP by Mumford and Sons
- "Johannesburg", a 1975 song by Gil Scott-Heron and Brian Jackson

== Other ==
- Johannesburg Declaration, enacted in 2002
- Johannesburg (horse) (born 1999), a racehorse from Kentucky

== See also ==
- Schloss Johannesburg (disambiguation) (Castle Johannesburg)
- Johannesberg (disambiguation)
- Johannisberg (disambiguation)
- Johannisburg (disambiguation)
- Witwatersrand
