= Norrköping Synagogue =

Synagogue in Norrköping, Sweden

- Swedish: Norrköpings synagoga
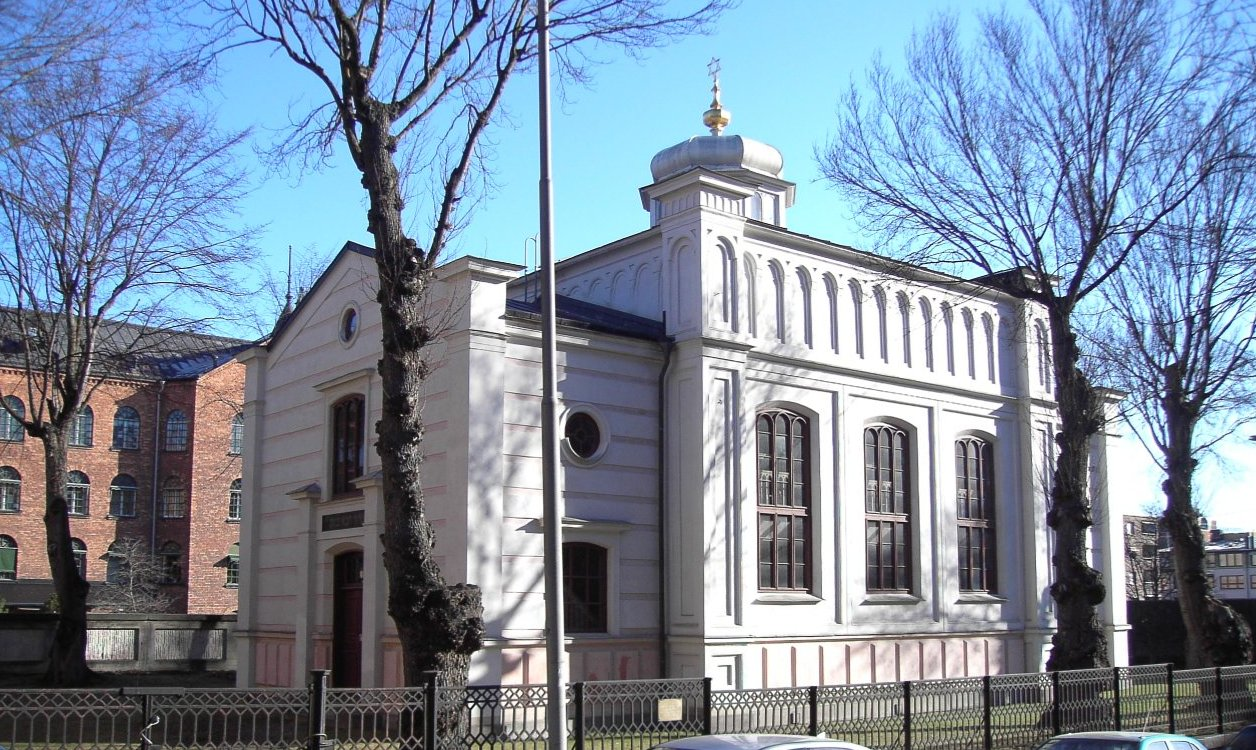
- The façade of the synagogue, in 2006

- Location of the synagogue in Östergötland County

Religion
- Affiliation: Conservative Judaism
- Rite: Nusach Ashkenaz
- Ecclesiastical or organizational status: Synagogue
- Status: semi-active

Location
- Location: Hallen 10, Brådgatan, Norrköping, Östergötland County
- Country: Sweden
- Interactive map of Norrköping Synagogue
- Coordinates: 58°35′36″N 16°10′43″E

Architecture
- Architects: Edvard Medén; Carl Stål
- Type: Synagogue architecture
- Style: Neoclassical; Moorish Revival
- Established: 1782 (as a congregation)
- Groundbreaking: 1855
- Completed: 1858
- Materials: Brick

The Norrköping Synagogue (Swedish: Norrköpings synagoga) is a Jewish congregation and synagogue, located on Bebyggelseregistret, in Brådgatan, in the Nordantill borough of Norrköping, in Östergötland County, Sweden. The synagogue was designed by Edvard Medén and Carl Stål in the Neoclassical and Moorish Revival styles and completed in 1858.

The synagogue was classified as a listed building in 1978.

== History ==
In accordance with the statute from 1782, Norrköping along with Stockholm and Gothenburg became the only cities where Jews were permitted to settle permanently at that time. A previous smaller synagogue had been built in 1790s, funded by the German-Jewish merchant Jacob Marcus. The current synagogue was built between 1855 and 1858, was based on designs made by the architects Edvard Medén and Carl Stål.

The synagogue no longer hosts regular services of worship due to the decline of the Jewish population in the area. However, the building is still used for concerts and other events, as well as occasional Jewish religious services. The congregation still exists as a legal entity, but activities in the synagogue are handled by the Stockholm congregation.

== See also ==
- History of the Jews in Sweden
- List of synagogues in Sweden
- Listed buildings in Östergötland County
