= Listed buildings in Östergötland County =

There are 132 listed buildings (Swedish: byggnadsminne) in Östergötland County.

== Boxholm Municipality ==
Image	Name	Premise	Number of buildings	Year built	Architect	Coordinates	ID
	Liljeholmens herrgård	Liljeholmen 1:5	3			58.03711°N 15.06331°E	21300000014600
	Stjärnesands gård	Stjärnesand 1:2	2			58.07341°N 15.20334°E	21300000014654
	Björnön	Ramfall 1:12 previously Ugglebo 1:1	3			58.06727°N 15.25253°E	21300000015676

== Finspång Municipality ==
Image	Name	Premise	Number of buildings	Year built	Architect	Coordinates	ID
	Finspångs slott	Norrmalm 1:4; Östermalm 1:6	8			58.70943°N 15.77301°E	21300000015569
	Häfla hammarsmedja	Hävla 3:2	15			58.90018°N 15.82478°E	21300000014872
	Renströmska skolan	Regna 3:12	1			58.89267°N 15.69415°E	21300000014842
	Risinge gamla prästgård	Risinge 1:48 previously 1:7	3			58.67530°N 15.84263°E	21300000015562
	Selesjö herrgård	Selesjö 1:6	5			58.87095°N 15.96567°E	21300000014877
	Sonstorps herrgård	Sonstorp 3:1	5			58.74154°N 15.62548°E	21300000015561
	Lugnet	Östermalm 1:8	2			58.70435°N 15.78579°E	21000001750201

== Kinda Municipality ==
Image	Name	Premise	Number of buildings	Year built	Architect	Coordinates	ID
	Kölefors vaddfabrik	Torp 1:9	4			58.03616°N 15.66021°E	21320000019106
	Ramshults loftbod	Ramshult 1:1	2			57.91610°N 15.64531°E	21300000014632

== Linköping Municipality ==
Image	Name	Premise	Number of buildings	Year built	Architect	Coordinates	ID
	Kv Abboten 1	Abboten 1	3			58.41044°N 15.61853°E	21300000008113
	Biskopsgården	Aposteln 2	4			58.41191°N 15.61684°E	21000001439681
	Askeby gästgivaregård	Linköping Askeby 1:1	1			58.40905°N 15.85356°E	21000001499840
	Brokinds herrgård	Brokind 1:44	15			58.21047°N 15.66066°E	21300000008104
	Domkyrkosysslomansgården	Aposteln 3	5			58.41188°N 15.61812°E	21300000008458
	Domkapitelhuset	Aposteln 1	2			58.41232°N 15.61529°E	21000001434060
	Ekenäs slott	Ekenäs 3:1	4			58.38203°N 15.94604°E	21300000008091
	F3 Malmslätt	Malmen 2:7	19			58.40812°N 15.52030°E	21300000000591
	Fillinge tingshus	Fillinge 7:1	2			58.34908°N 15.84340°E	21300000007961
	Flistads brunn	Norra Lund 3:2	3			58.47998°N 15.43312°E	21300000008099
	Grävstens säteri	Grävsten 5:1, 6:1	6			58.35180°N 15.89089°E	21300000008086
	Gymnastikhuset, Linköping	Atleten 1 previously Stg 2309	1			58.41165°N 15.61543°E	21300000008180
	Hantverkargårdarna	Anemonen 1-2 previously Azalean 48-49	6			58.41317°N 15.61027°E	21300000008157
	Klostret	Absalon 1	1			58.41239°N 15.61834°E	21300000000584
	Lambohofs säteri	Lambohov 2:20, 2:23, 2:27	9			58.37770°N 15.55698°E	21300000008178
	Linköpings centralstation	Vasastaden 1:6 previously Järnvägen 1:1	1			58.41604°N 15.62594°E	21300000008460
	Linköpings slott	Innerstaden 1:13	2			58.41023°N 15.61504°E	21300000008454
	Ljungs slott	Ljung 1:6	7			58.52808°N 15.44434°E	21300000008106
	Lärarhögskolan	Adjunkten 1	3			58.41155°N 15.60947°E	21300000008116
	Malmslätts stationshus	Kärna Bandel 1:3 previously 1:1	1			58.41083°N 15.51577°E	21300000000590
	Onkel Adamsgården	Adam 16	6			58.41297°N 15.60966°E	21300000008159
	Röda magasinet	Smedstad 1:23 previously 1:2	1			58.39539°N 15.60893°E	21300000008459
	Stavsätters herrgård	Stavsätter 1:1, 2:1, 3:1, 4:1; Farsbo 1:1; Svartsätter 1:1	13			58.29516°N 15.67335°E	21300000008102
	Stenhusgården	Eolus 1	1			58.41018°N 15.61892°E	21300000008085
	Sturefors slott	Sturefors 1:4	8			58.32525°N 15.77152°E	21300000008098
	Tuna kungsgård	Rystads-Tuna 1:1	4			58.48029°N 15.68241°E	21300000009846
	Bjärka-Säby	Bjärka-Säby 1:4	1			58.27064°N 15.73891°E	21300000008117
	Östergötland Countysmuseum	Akademien 1	1			58.41387°N 15.61579°E	21300000008105

1. Hemslöjdshuset, Linköping
2. Rhyzeliusgårdens medeltidshus

== Mjölby Municipality ==
Image	Name	Premise	Number of buildings	Year built	Architect	Coordinates	ID
	Borgargården Brödraklostret	Brödraklostret 1	1			58.39730°N 15.08574°E	21300000014898
	Härsnäs missionshus	Härsnäs 1:7	2			58.28896°N 15.22975°E	21300000014989
	Nordénska gården	Brödraklostret 12	3			58.39594°N 15.08673°E	21300000014903
	Sandbergska gården	Brödraklostret 6-8	4			58.39710°N 15.08651°E	21300000014901
	Sjölingården	Munken 1	1			58.39684°N 15.08554°E	21300000014904
	Skänninge rådhus	Magistraten 2	1			58.39527°N 15.08661°E	21300000014907
	Spellinge herrgård	Spellinge 2:18	9			58.26679°N 15.31457°E	21300000015596
	Sörby loge	Mjölby 40:9	2			58.31122°N 15.11649°E	21300000014657

== Motala Municipality ==
Image	Name	Premise	Number of buildings	Year built	Architect	Coordinates	ID
	Ekebyborna gamla prästgård	Nässja 2:2	2			58.54549°N 15.19722°E	21300000007964
	Gamla Folkets hus	Folkdansen 1 previously stg 3137	1			58.54804°N 15.06119°E	21300000026400
	Godegårds säteri	Torshyttan 1:16	19			58.74441°N 15.17885°E	21300000008136
	Johannisbergs herrgård	Johannisberg 1:2	5			58.74886°N 15.45184°E	21300000008146
	Medevi brunn	Medevi brunn 2:1, 2:13-15	69			58.67345°N 14.96027°E	21300000008140
	Olivehults herrgård	Olivehult 10:53 previously Olivehult 5:1	8			58.60960°N 15.26114°E	21300000008141
	Ulvåsa slott	Ulvåsa 6:1, 6:15-17	15			58.55350°N 15.15108°E	21300000007965
	Övralid	Övra Lid 1:1 - 1:2	14			58.60745°N 14.94429°E	21300000008139

== Norrköping Municipality ==
Image	Name	Premise	Number of buildings	Year built	Architect	Coordinates	ID
	Bergsbrogården (Skiöldska huset), Norrköpings stadsmuseum|Knäppingen (Norrköpings stadsmuseum)	Bergsbron 8	10			58.58970°N 16.17987°E	21300000014663
	Bergslagsgården	Bergsbron 7	1	1750		58.59025°N 16.17894°E	21300000015608
	Eschelsonska, Waseska husen	Gamla Rådstugan 1	2	1730s onwards		58.58859°N 16.18551°E	21300000015611
	Kv. Varvet 1 Previously Norrköpings sjukhus|sjukhusbyggnaderna	Varvet 1	2			58.59315°N 16.18815°E	21300000014803
	previously Skandinaviska banken	Storgatan 10	1	early 20th century	Carl Bergsten	58.59192°N 16.18608°E	21300000014807
	Gamla De Geerskolan	Elementarskolan 2 previously Folkskolan 1	1	1866	Carl Theodor Malm	58.58535°N 16.18186°E	21300000014707
	Gamla Gymnastikhuset	Klockan 1	1	before 1840	Carl Theodor Malm	58.58600°N 16.18335°E	21300000014718
	Gamla Stadshuset i Norrköping	Vett; Vapen 1	1	1802–03	Carl Fredrik Sundvall; Carl Theodor Malm	58.59411°N 16.18367°E	21300000015612
	Gamla tullhuset, Norrköping	Saltängen 1:1 previously 1:2	1	1784, 1842, 1876	Johan Fredric Fehmer; Fredrik Blom; Carl Theodor Glosemeyer	58.59486°N 16.19254°E	21300000015626
	Grensholms herrgård	Grensholm 2:1	15	late 17th century		58.53037°N 15.80606°E	21300000014980
	Hedvigs församlings prästgård	Väktaren 1	2	moved 1782	Carl Theodor Malm	58.59302°N 16.18918°E	21300000014814
	Himmelstalunds herrgård samt Himmelstalunds hälsobrunn	Himmelstadlund 1:1	8	1730s		58.58963°N 16.15432°E	21300000014816
	Hofgrens gård	Hovgren 1:1	10	mid 18th century onwards		58.53793°N 16.81644°E	21000001519600
	Holmentornet	Kvarnholmen 3 previously Kopparkypen 28	1	1750	Carl Hårleman	58.58758°N 16.18426°E	21300000014725
	Hörsalen (Sankt Johannis gamla kyrka)	Landskyrkan 4	1	1827, 1913	Carl Bergsten	58.58810°N 16.18744°E	21300000015627
	Johannisborgs slott	Slottshagen 1:2	1	early 17th century	Hans Fleming	58.60010°N 16.19719°E	21300000014792
	Jonsbergs herrgård	Jonsberg 2:1	3	1791		58.52437°N 16.82972°E	21300000014625
	Norrköpingsanstalten	Drag 1	1	1790		58.58932°N 16.17042°E	21300000015008
	Kåreholms herrgård	Kåreholm 3:1	4	1823	möjligen Lars Jacob von Röök	58.42648°N 16.71949°E	21300000014846
	Linghallen	Getängen 1	2	1925	Torben Grut	58.58445°N 16.18455°E	21300000014709
	Lithografen	Flöjten 1	7	1909–11	Carl Bergsten	58.59184°N 16.19889°E	21300000015640
	Luststället Abborreberg	Lindö 2:38	5	1810s onwards		58.60896°N 16.27324°E	21300000014838
	Lövstad slott	Lövstad 2:1	6	1630–60		58.55081°N 16.04111°E	21300000014629
	Marieborgs herrgård	Slottshagen 2:2 previously Stadsäga 1673 B	2	1760s		58.61983°N 16.17889°E	21300000015002
	Mauritzbergs herrgård	Mauritsberg 2:22	7	1722–25	Claes Ekeblad d.ä.	58.60568°N 16.67810°E	21300000015005
	Norrköpings centralstation	Butängen 2:1	1	1866	Adolf W. Edelsvärd	58.59641°N 16.18361°E	21300000014669
	Norrköpings rådhus	Rådstugan 13; Gamla Staden 1:2	2	1907–10	Isak Gustav Clason	58.59187°N 16.18715°E	21300000014763
	Norrköping Synagogue	Hallen 10	1	1855–58	Edvard Medén; Carl Ståhl	58.59337°N 16.17865°E	21300000014713
	Norrköpings Tennishall	Såpkullen 1:2 littera A	1	1929	Anders Möller	58.58541°N 16.17202°E	21300000023112
	Promenaderna i Norrköping	Marielund 1:1 etc. Östantill 1:1 etc. Kneippen 1:3 etc.	none	1869–96		58.58498°N 16.18056°E	21300000014768
	Ribbingsholms herrgård	Ribbingsholm 1:1, 2:1, 3:1	4	1805–09		58.58941°N 15.89093°E	21300000014637
	Ringborgska huset	Enväldet 5	1	1784		58.59374°N 16.18387°E	21300000014695
	Rodga herrgård	Rodga 1:6	4	18th century		58.73617°N 16.09241°E	21300000014863
	Sankt Olofsskolan	Storkyrkan 9 Gamla Staden 1:2	1	1908	Carl Bergsten	58.59014°N 16.19107°E	21300000014795
	Skoga	Stenkullen 1:2	1	1891	Agi Lindegren	58.66853°N 16.21520°E	21300000014639
	Sockermästarens bostad	Vågskålen 8	1	1740–41, 1760	Johan Eberhard Carlberg	58.59036°N 16.18570°E	21300000014809
	Stenhuset på Saltängen	Stenhuset 6	1	1784	Johan Fredric Fehmer	58.59492°N 16.18984°E	21300000015643
	Strykjärnet	Laxholmen 2 previously Kopparkypen 23	1	1917	Folke Bensow	58.58914°N 16.17996°E	21300000014724
	Swartziska huset	Knäppingsborg 7	2	1842	Carl Theodor Malm	58.58929°N 16.18467°E	21300000014723
	Villa Norrköping	Klockaretorpet 1:4 previously Norden 1:4	1	1964	Sverre Fehn	58.58112°N 16.15244°E	21300000014761
	Teatern i Norrköping	Teatern 1	1	1908	Axel Anderberg	58.59408°N 16.18205°E	21300000014799
	Televerkets hus, von Leesenska-Ribbingska huset	Kronan 8	2	1862, 1912		58.59016°N 16.18702°E	21300000014726
	Viskärs fyrplats	Arkö 1:5, 1:95	13			58.48779°N 16.99020°E	21000001534440
	W6-huset	Renströmmen 7	1	possibly 1760	Johan Fredric Fehmer	58.59441°N 16.18646°E	21300000014773

== Söderköping Municipality ==
Image	Name	Premise	Number of buildings	Year built	Architect	Coordinates	ID
	Kvarteret Kung Johan 3	Kung Johan 3	8			58.48150°N 16.32141°E	21300000014924
	Björkviks herrgård	Björkvik 2:1	7			58.36409°N 16.09541°E	21300000015006
	Blomqvistska huset	Hertigen 2	3			58.48161°N 16.31987°E	21300000014916
	Braskens hus	Bispen 7	2			58.48117°N 16.31900°E	21300000014911
	Ekenstugan	Ämtevik 1:27	2			58.33492°N 16.85700°E	21300000014856
	Engelholms herrgård	Ängelholm 3:1	3			58.28630°N 16.78190°E	21300000015652
	Garvaregården	Garvaren 1, 9	3			58.48130°N 16.32098°E	21300000014917
	Husby herrgård	Mogata-Husby 3:1, 3:45, 3:162-164	5			58.45969°N 16.46635°E	21300000014660
	Hylinge herrgård	Hylinge 3:1	6			58.46552°N 16.16095°E	21300000014998
	Korsnäs prästgård	Sankt Anna Prästgård 1:3	5			58.33422°N 16.66864°E	21300000014847
	Söderköpings rådhus	Rådstugan 1	1			58.48170°N 16.32056°E	21300000014926
	Thorönsborgs herrgård	Torönsborg 2:1	7			58.35377°N 16.73820°E	21300000015658

== Vadstena Municipality ==
Image	Name	Premise	Number of buildings	Year built	Architect	Coordinates	ID
	Vadstena kloster med nunneklostret Munkklostret; Klosterträdgården	Örtagården 1 Klostret 1 Munkträdgården 1-2	11			58.45077°N 14.89157°E	21300000009895
	Hovs skräddaregård	Hov 10:5	3			58.37858°N 14.92497°E	21000001536540
	Acharii-Bergenstrålska huset	Borgmästaren 8, 11	1			58.44851°N 14.89254°E	21300000010086
	Apoteksgården	Slottsfogden 9	5	mid 18th century		58.44763°N 14.88750°E	21300000010083
	Biskop Kols källare	Herrestad 5:3	1			58.39054°N 14.81294°E	21300000009888
	Borghamnsskolan	Västerlösa 1:60 previously 1:51	22			58.38152°N 14.68109°E	21300000009892
	Gamla Hospitalet; Previously Birgittas sjukhus	Maria 3 previously Birgitta 4	1			58.45113°N 14.89440°E	21300000009893
	Helgeandsgården	Helgeandsgården 4	1			58.44809°N 14.89012°E	21300000014592
	Mårten Skinnares hus Gamla dårhuset	Maria 1 previously Birgitta 2	2			58.45158°N 14.89416°E	21300000000582
	Odhnerska gården	Sjögården 11, 17	3			58.44939°N 14.88945°E	21300000010087
	Udd Jönssons hus	Knapen 5	1			58.44768°N 14.88826°E	21300000009908
	Vadstena rådhus	Slottsfogden 8	1	from 1490		58.44719°N 14.88758°E	21300000009912
	Vadstena slott	Slottet 1 Vadstena 4:73	1			58.44593°N 14.88366°E	21300000000583

== Valdemarsvik Municipality ==
Image	Name	Premise	Number of buildings	Year built	Architect	Coordinates	ID
	Villa Albacken	Valdemarsvik 4:60	1			58.20200°N 16.61211°E	21000001535483
	Breviksnäs herrgård	Breviksnäs 3:8	5			58.13240°N 16.80623°E	21300000014603
	Fågelviks herrgård	Fågelvik 1:1, 1:2	8			58.12293°N 16.70301°E	21300000014957
	Gräslundska släktgården	Gräsmarö 1:2	10			58.27307°N 16.97597°E	21000001769901
	Kättilö tullhus	Barösund 1:1	2			58.19493°N 16.89739°E	21300000014604

== Ydre Municipality ==
Image	Name	Premise	Number of buildings	Year built	Architect	Coordinates	ID
	Råås kvarn	Torpa-Rås 1:3	4			57.93082°N 15.12546°E	21300000014935
	Smedstorps by or dubbelgård	Vi-Smedstorp 1:5 previously 1:3	18			57.94362°N 15.41419°E	21300000015660

== Åtvidaberg Municipality ==
Image	Name	Premise	Number of buildings	Year built	Architect	Coordinates	ID
	Salvedals gamla skjutshåll	Borkhult 2:79	4			58.28179°N 16.15139°E	21000001538480
	Bortgården i Falerum	Falerum 1:2	11			58.14487°N 16.21636°E	21300000014605
	Grävsätters kuskbostad	Grävsätter 2:38	1			58.15487°N 16.30984°E	21300000014606
	Herrsäters majorsboställe	Herrsätter 1:1	3			58.29088°N 15.97561°E	21300000014987
	Ålundamagasinet	Mellersta Ålunda 5	1			58.19769°N 16.00178°E	21300000027692

== Ödeshög Municipality ==
Image	Name	Premise	Number of buildings	Year built	Architect	Coordinates	ID
	Stora Broby väderkvarn	Ödeshög Broby 1:13	1			58.29757°N 14.68040°E	21000001484460
	Ellen Keys Strand	Ombergs Kronopark 1:2	2			58.29450°N 14.63954°E	21300000015001
