= Johannesberg =

Johannesberg may refer to:

- Johannesberg, Bavaria, Germany
- Janov nad Nisou, a village in the Czech Republic, known as Johannesberg in German
- Jánský Vrch Castle, a castle in the Czech Republic, known as Johannesberg in German
- Battle of Johannesberg of the Seven Years' War
- Janževa Gora, Slovenia, known as Johannesberg in German

== See also ==
- Johannesburg, a city in South Africa
- Johannesburg (disambiguation)
- Johannisberg (disambiguation)
- Johannisburg (disambiguation)
