= Johannisburg (disambiguation) =

Johannisburg is the German name for Pisz, a town in Poland.

Johannisburg may also refer to:

- Schloss Johannisburg (Castle Johannisburg), in Germany
- Johannisburg Township, Washington County, Illinois, USA

== See also ==
- Johannisberg (disambiguation)
- Johannesberg (disambiguation)
- Johannesburg (disambiguation)
