= Lars Jacob von Röök =

Swedish painter and lithographer (1778–1867)

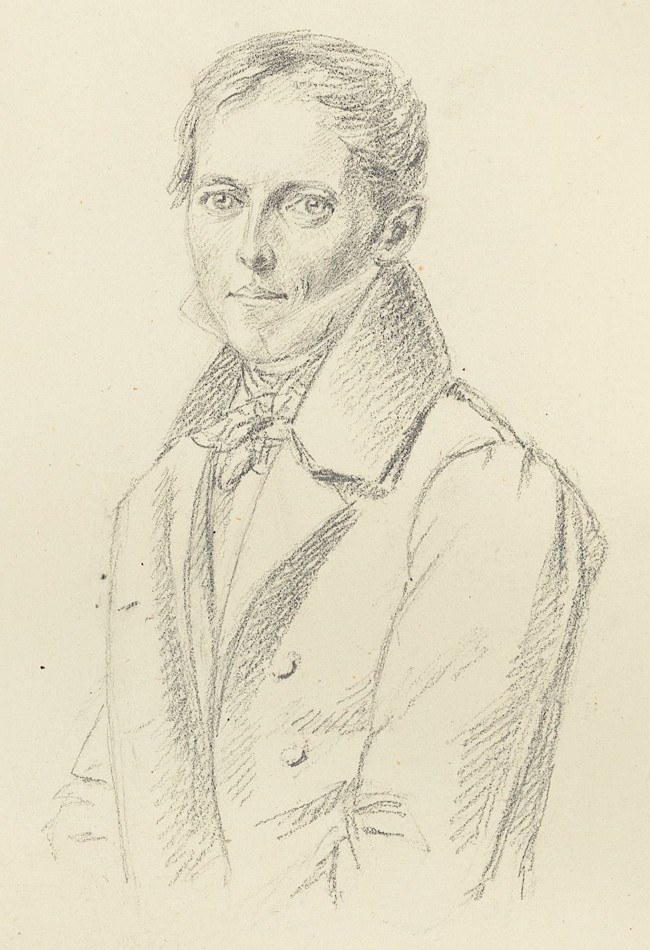
L.J. von Röök. Portrait by Maria Röhl (1834)

Lars Jacob von Röök (14 October 1778, Stralsund - 6 February 1867, Stockholm) was a Swedish painter, architect and museum manager.

== Biography ==
His father, Carl Fredrik von Röök, was a military officer in charge of the Stralsund fortification brigade. He wanted Lars to follow in his footsteps and made him an apprentice at the fortifications. Lars took his officer's exam in 1795.

After several trips abroad on assignments for King Gustav, he began to take an interest in art and made his own study trips to Spain, Portugal and Italy, with an extended stay in Rome. In 1809, he resigned from his commission. In 1823, he returned to Rome where he painted and acted as an assistant to the sculptor Johan Niclas Byström. The following year, he set down his impressions in a book called Anteckningar under en resa på Sicilien (Notes from a trip to Sicily).

In 1830, he was appointed "Kamrer" (Chamberlain) for the "Konglig Museum" (now the Nationalmuseum) in Stockholm, where he arranged the collection according to principles he had learned while studying overseas. His detailed plans for the Egyptian Room and the Porcelain Room at Stockholm Palace may still be seen at the museum. He received the title of "Hovintendent" (a type of financial overseer) in 1837 and, two years later, became a member of the Royal Swedish Academy of Fine Arts.

When a new building was planned for the museum in the 1840s, he presented some proposals for locations on Helgeandsholmen and along Slottsbacken, but they were never seriously considered. In 1850, he resigned from his official positions at the museum, but was still in charge of the personal collection belonging to King Oscar. Later, the King commissioned him to do ornamental work at Haga Castle.

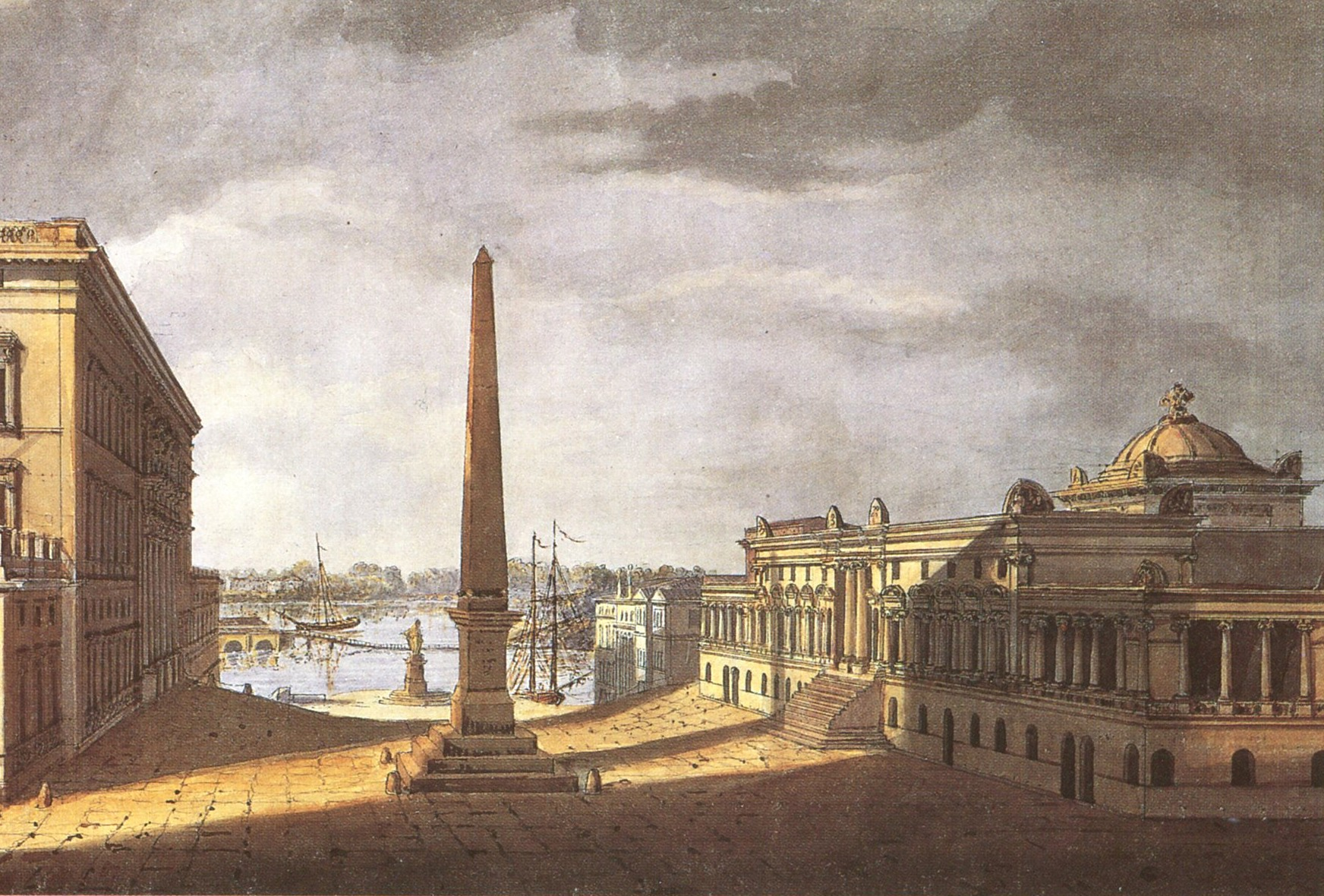
Proposal for a museum on Slottsbacken

Despite the rejection of his museum designs, he was also a moderately successful architect. Among his works are the gazebo in the garden at Finspång Castle and the Kåreholm Mansion in Norrköping. Many of his works are still in the possession of the Nationalmuseum.
