= Hans Hahne (archaeologist) =

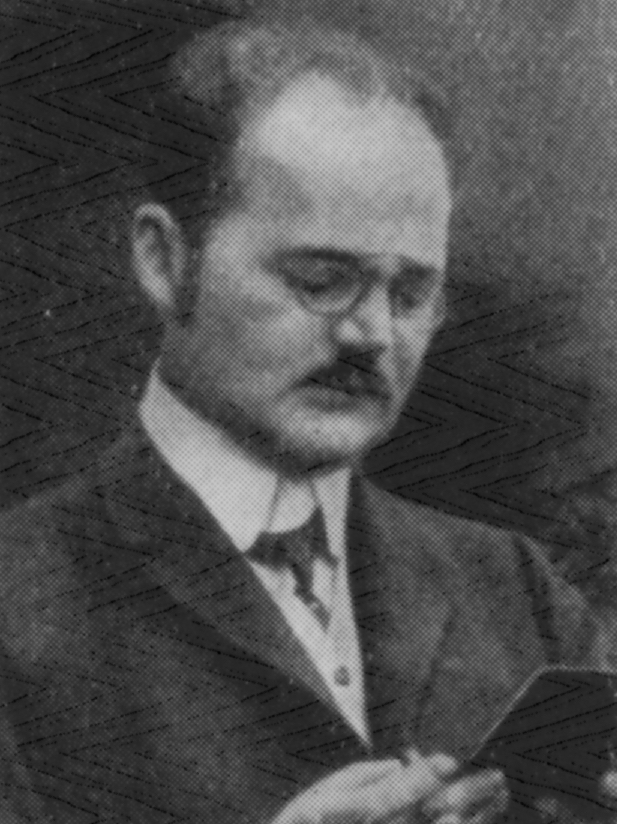
Hans Hahne

Hans Hahne (18 Mar 1875, Piesdorf – 2 Feb 1935, Halle (Saale)) was a German physician and prehistorian.

== Life ==
Hahne was born the son of a sugar manufacturer. He attended school in Artern and after 1885 in Berlin and Magdeburg, where he graduated in 1894 from the Domgymnasium. At the University of Jena, the Ludwig-Maximilians-Universität München, and Leipzig University, he studied natural sciences and medicine and received his MD in 1899. This was followed by specialist training in Bern, Berlin, and Leipzig. In 1902, Hahne settled in Magdeburg as an internist and neurologist, but closed his practice in 1905 to devote himself to prehistory and early history.

In the years 1905-1907, Hahne studied prehistory under Gustaf Kossinna at the Friedrich Wilhelm University of Berlin. From 1907, he became assistant at the Lower Saxony State Museum in Hannover, where he was appointed assistant director in 1908. At the same time he was an adjunct professor at the Leibniz University Hannover. In 1912, Hahne was appointed director of the Halle State Museum of Prehistory. In World War I he was exempted from military service due to a heart and liver disease. At the University of Halle, he received his doctorate in February 1918 with his thesis "Die geologische Lagerung der Moorleichen und Moorbrücken als Beitrag zur Forschung der erdgeschichtlichen Vorgänge der Nacheiszeit " ("The geological stratification of bog bodies and bog villages as a contribution to the research of geological processes of the post-glacial period"). He was appointed professor in May and habilitated in November 1918 at the Leibniz University Hannover in prehistory (Prehistoric Archeology). In 1921, Hahne was appointed associate professor, in November 1933 full professor; shortly afterwards he was appointed rector of the University of Halle. As a "Volkish" scientist, he also incorporated anthroposophical influences into his theories. Before 1933 Hahne joined the National Socialist Party and was Deputy District Culture Warden (Gaukulturwart), Director of Training in Racial Science (Rassenkunde) in Gau Mitteldeutschland (Saxony) of the SS Race and Settlement Main Office (Rasse- und Siedlungshauptamt). In February 1934, Hahne suffered a severe stroke with paralysis on his left side, which hindered him so much that he had to turn over most of his duties to colleagues.

Hahne died on 2 February 1935 in Halle.

Hahne's research interests were bog archeology and bog bodies, such as the "Bernuthsfeld Man".
