= Alfred Götze =

bronze relief in the stairwell of Steinsburg Museum

Alfred Götze (or Goetze) (1 Jun 1865, Weimar–20 Nov 1948, Römhild) was a German prehistorian. Götze may have received the first doctorate in the field of prehistory and early history, and later became one of the first scientists active in the field. He worked for a long time in the Archaeological Preservation (Bodensekmalpflege) in Berlin and Brandenburg and was founder and long-time director of the Steinsburg Museum in Römhild.
