= Julius Riemer =

German factory owner, natural history and ethnological collector and museum founder

Julius Riemer (4 April 1880, Berlin – 17 November 1958, Lutherstadt Wittenberg) was a German factory owner, natural history and ethnological collector and museum founder.

== Life as a factory owner and collector ==
Julius Riemer grew up as the first child of a Berlin manufacturing family. As the eldest son, he was destined to be the main heir to the factory. His main interest throughout his life, however, was science, which he was unable to pursue due to time and family constraints. Collecting became a substitute for him here: a visit to the Museum of Natural History in Berlin, opened in 1889, together with his grandfather became a key experience for the nine-year-old Julius Riemer. Since then he collected zoological specimens. At the age of 14, he already owned more than 30 prepared animals. For this he temporarily neglected school, which led to conflicts with his family. Nevertheless, he eventually took over his parents' factory and expanded it. In the 1940s, the company was a leader in Germany in the production of leather gloves.

Riemer regularly used business trips within Germany to expand his collection. To this end, he maintained contacts with public museums, private collectors and dealers. He bought and exchanged objects and constantly expanded his knowledge. Riemer obtained his collector's items from all continents. Throughout his life, he did not travel to countries outside Europe, but he supported various researchers who sent him objects in gratitude. He also systematically bought up entire collections, for example, in 1939 he acquired the collection of Eugen Hintz, comprising more than 1000 ethnological objects from Africa and the South Seas. The collection contained in particular natural history and ethnological objects. By the end of the 1940s, he owned one of the largest and most valuable private collections of natural history and ethnology in Germany. The focus within the ethnological part of the collection was on Africa and Oceania. Among the natural objects were minerals, fossils, feathers, skulls as well as bones, pressed plants, molluscs and insects. His main interest was in zoology – this part of the collection was known as the best and most extensive in any private collection in Germany. To this day, the collection contains several tens of thousands of objects, some of very high scientific value. For example, the museum owns the skeleton of an extinct giant auk and a very systematic collection of ethnographic pieces from Oceania, as well as larger holdings from Africa and individual exhibits from America.

As a result of the air war, Riemer decided to move part of his collection to his house in Sieversdorf and also rented barns and other land from farmers. Some of Riemer's houses in Berlin were badly damaged during the war. When his city villa not far from the Red City Hall in Berlin was destroyed in January 1944, about a third of the collection was lost.

Riemer's factories were partly abandoned after the destruction of the war, and partly socialised after the war. Riemer's younger brother worked as managing director of the now state-owned factory near Dessau in the 1950s.

Julius Riemer was married a total of three times, although hardly any information is available about his first two marriages. He divorced his first wife Luzie in the 1930s, and his second wife Hedwig died in 1945 after a long illness. Julius Riemer was married in 1947 in his third marriage to his godchild, the studied museologist Charlotte Mathieu.

== Riemer’s Life During the Nazi Era ==
During the National Socialist period, Julius Riemer was active in several scholarly associations, including the Main Association of German Speleologists, of which he temporarily served as chairman. As part of the process of Gleichschaltung, the association was incorporated into the “Ahnenerbe” and thus placed under the organizational authority of the SS. This structural incorporation occurred independently of the members’ will and did not constitute personal SS affiliation for Riemer. Similar transfers affected other bourgeois associations, such as the International Society for the Preservation of the Wisent, which Riemer had already belonged to since the Weimar Republic and which was later transferred into the “German Guild of Wisent Breeders and Wardens.” Several independent provenance studies, including expert reports by Enrico Heitzer (2012) and by Facts & Files (2022), found no evidence of Riemer’s membership in the SS or in other Nazi organizations. In addition to this fundamental distance from the regime, Riemer’s personal relationships with scholars persecuted as Jews are also documented. He had a close connection to the speleologist Benno Wolf, with whom Riemer had collaborated since the 1920s. In a letter to Wolf intercepted by the Gestapo in 1938, Riemer criticized the exclusion of Jewish researchers and wrote: “Since by law so‑called alien people, who have accomplished enormous things for science, are neither allowed to enter the museum nor attend any lectures, I have no desire to involve myself in any way [in the speleological association].” Wolf was later deported to Theresienstadt and died there. Riemer also had a close relationship with the ornithologist Oscar Neumann. According to the account of the zoologist Hermann Pohle, who himself had been removed from museum service because of his Jewish background, Riemer took Neumann into his home, provided him with work opportunities, and supported his escape via Spain to the United States. “This, too, should never be forgotten.” Pohle further wrote about Riemer: “He hated National Socialism with all his heart.”

Additional archival evidence confirms this attitude. For example, in a 1941 letter to the Reich Association for Karst and Cave Research, Gauleiter Emil Stürtz referred to Riemer as a former “democrat” who was “completely alien and indifferent” to the “National Socialist worldview.” These sources show that Riemer’s distance from the Nazi regime was expressed not only in his institutional restraint but also in his personal commitment to those who were persecuted.

== Cave research and contact with Benno Wolf ==
Riemer was involved in at least 20 scientific associations and societies, including the Berlin Society for Anthropology, Ethnology and Prehistory, which still exists today. His special interest was cave research. Julius Riemer was on friendly terms with the most famous German speleologist Benno Wolf. Wolf was a baptised Christian, but had Jewish roots. In the increasingly difficult NS period for Benno Wolf, Riemer was an important support for him – he helped Wolf wherever he could, including with financial contributions. Benno Wolf's bequest, in which he bequeathed his scientific material to Julius Riemer, dates from 5 September 1936 (KNOLLE 1990). At Wolf's request, Riemer also took over the editorship of the cave explorer's main association journal from 1937 onwards; only the last double issue of the journal comes from the editorial pen of Florian Heller. For a time Riemer was also the acting head of the main association. As Nazi pressure intensified, Riemer felt compelled, on 15 August 1939, to replace Ahnenerbe-Reichsgeschäftsführer, who was later sentenced to death in the Nuremberg Medical Trial Wolfram Sievers of his cooperation to reduce mistrust. On 11 May 1941, the Reichsbund für Karst- und Höhlenforschung Reich Association for Karst and Cave Research was founded in Salzburg; this marked the Gleichschaltung of German and Austrian cave research. Riemer had himself elected to the board and held the office of treasurer and was – together with Florian Heller – editor. The old main association continued to exist. In October 1942, Riemer resigned from his posts "for health reasons" – in reality there were other reasons. For on 6 July 1942 Benno Wolf – 71 years old – had been arrested by the Gestapo and taken with the 17th old-age transport from Berlin to the Ghetto Theresienstadt. Julius Riemer could not help him, and also did not know what had happened to Wolf. He wrote in 1947 that Wolf had then "disappeared without a trace". The details of Wolf's deportation and death could only be clarified after the collapse of the Nazi regime. On 25 April 1947, Riemer bequeathed Benno Wolf's estate materials located in Pottenstein to the Nuremberg Natural History Society, Department for Karst Research, by power of attorney.

== Museum of Natural History and Ethnology ==
=== Development of the museum until its closure in 2011 ===
After 1945, Julius Riemer received an offer from the provincial pastor and biologist Otto Kleinschmidt to set up a natural history and ethnology museum in Wittenberg Castle as an extension to the church research home there. Julius Riemer had already maintained both private and business contacts with Wittenberg and its surroundings for decades. In 1947, the relocation of the collection was completed. In 1949, the first exhibition rooms were opened, In 1954 the foundation of the Museum für Natur- und Völkerkunde from his private collection, which he directed until his death in 1958. His wife Charlotte Riemer, who as a studied museologist had already supported her husband in building up the museum, continued the museum and expanded it considerably. In connection with the concentration of ethnological collections at four locations planned by the GDR, numerous loans and donations from other museums came to the museum in Wittenberg, which as a new foundation complemented the three traditional ethnological museum locations in Leipzig, Dresden and Herrnhut.

The museum occupied two floors in Wittenberg Castle. The lower floor housed the natural history exhibition with the subject areas of evolution, zoological systematics and physiology and one room each with primates and ungulates; the upper floor contained exhibitions on the cultures of Africa and Oceania, plus smaller areas on Ancient Egypt and Pre-Columbian America. An area on the nature of Oceania and a special exhibition on the ethnology of Japan complete the ethnological section. This exhibition concept was redesigned and modernised after Mrs. Riemer's death, but essentially remained until 2011.

The official director of the museum from 1990 until his retirement in 2001 was the ethnologist Klaus Glöckner (deceased 2018), who had worked at the museum in various capacities since 1980. He organised numerous special exhibitions during this time or brought them to the museum. Klaus Glöckner was particularly known in the region for his active educational work in the natural sciences. With the death of Julius Riemer's widow in 2002, the collection passed to the city of Wittenberg through an inheritance contract. The collection thus became part of the municipal collections under the direction of Andreas Wurda.

=== Storing the exhibition and plans for a new conception ===
Since the Wittenberg Castle was completely renovated and architecturally redesigned from 2011 onwards in view of the Luther Year 2017, the exhibition there with objects from the Julius Riemer Collection had to move out and was stored. A larger collection of ethnological objects, which had been kept and exhibited on loan in Wittenberg, returned to its original location, the Museum Mauretianum in Altenburg (Thuringia). Since a new use was planned for the castle, the search began for a new location for the remaining collection. The possibility of permanent storage of the collection was also considered. A citizens' initiative, which was transformed into the association Freundeskreis Julius-Riemer-Sammlung e.V. in 2013, campaigned for a new conception of the collection. In order to achieve this goal, it promoted the preservation of the collection and its museum and academic reception with numerous events. The association received support from scientists from all over Germany. Since 2013, the primatologist Carsten Niemitz Patron of the Friends of the Riemer Collection. Since 2014, the city presented initial plans to reopen the Riemer Collection in the context of the planned museum complex at Arsenalplatz. In March 2015, the ground floor was opened in the Museum of Municipal Collections in the Zeughaus in Wittenberg: Eighteen "crown jewels" of the city are exhibited on three hundred square metres, including three objects from the collection of Julius Riemer as a reference to the permanent exhibition on natural history and ethnology planned in the same building with pieces from the Riemer collection.

=== The new permanent exhibition "Riemer's World" ===
Since 21 December 2018, the collection once again has a permanent exhibition. On the first floor of the Zeughaus, approximately 1500 exhibits from Julius Riemer's collection are displayed on approximately 500 square metres of exhibition space. Objects from natural history and ethnology are presented predominantly and in roughly equal parts. In addition, there is a smaller exhibition area that deals biographically with Julius Riemer as a collector and patron. The exhibition entitled "Riemer's World" has the character of a foam magazine. Scientific content is conveyed via 15 leading objects each from natural history and ethnology to make the large number of exhibits on display didactically accessible. At the centre of the exhibition is an installation in the form of a carousel that playfully relates ethnological and natural science exhibits. This exhibition of the Wittenberg Municipal Collections was prepared over a period of several years in cooperation with the Friends of the Julius Riemer Collection. It is the only permanent ethnological exhibition in Saxony-Anhalt presenting exhibits from different continents.

=== Special ethnological exhibitions ===
In 2016, the Wittenberg Municipal Collections, in cooperation with the Friends of the Julius Riemer Collection, once again presented a special ethnological exhibition to the public. In the Zeughaus, the exhibition "The Discovery of the Individual" Sculptures of the West African Lobi were exhibited, which came from the collection of the Berlin architect Rainer Greschik. Subsequently, the collector handed over a number of objects to the city. This not only continued the tradition of donating ethnological objects initiated by Riemer, but also expanded the holdings of the city's collections by adding an ethnic group not previously represented in the Riemer collection. The special exhibition was deliberately a preview of the planned permanent exhibition in the same building. Since December 2017, this concept has been continued with the culturally comparative special exhibition "Objects of Worship – Material Evidence of Faith, Reverence and Remembrance in the Cultures of Mankind", conceived to mark the end of the Luther Year. Relics, votives and other cult objects from six continents and three millennia are on display. For the first time since 2012, natural history and ethnological objects from the Julius Riemer Collection were exhibited in a thematic context. However, since the majority of the Riemer Collection was not yet available for the new presentation planned for 2018, this exhibition also relied heavily on loans. Through explicit reference to the former Wittenberg Heiltum and through the pointed presentation of selected objects from the Riemer Collection and the collections on the city's history, the museum unity of all the city's collections in the Zeughaus, which is the aim of the future permanent exhibition, was reinforced in terms of content. For both special exhibitions, the ethnologist Nils Seethaler could be won as a scientific advisor. He also arranged the external loans and organised their transfer to Wittenberg.

== Literature ==
- Karina Blüthgen: Finissage im Zeughaus, Seit es Menschen gibt, werden Dinge verehrt In: Mitteldeutsche Zeitung vom 22. April 2018.
- Rainer Greschik/ Nils Seethaler (Vorwort): Lobi. Westafrikanische Skulpturen aus der Sammlung Greschik. Herausgegeben anlässlich der Ausstellung „Die Entdeckung des Individuums“ in der Lutherstadt Wittenberg, 2016.
- R. Gruber-Lieblich: Das Museum für Natur- und Völkerkunde „Julius Riemer“ – In: J.Hüttemann & P. Pasternack: Wissensspuren. Bildung und Wissenschaft in Wittenberg nach 1945 (Wittenberg 2004)
- R. Gruber-Lieblich & F. Knolle: Julius Riemer – Mäzen von Benno Wolf – Mitt. Verb. dt. Höhlen- u. Karstforscher 53 (2): 43–45 (2004)
- F. Heller: Nachrufe auf Julius Riemer und Hans Brand – Mitt. Verb. dt. Höhlen- u. Karstforscher 5(2): 8 (1959)
- M.H. Kater: Das „Ahnenerbe“ der SS 1935–1945. Ein Beitrag zur Kulturpolitik des Dritten Reiches – Studien Zeitgesch., Inst. f. Zeitgesch. (1974)
- F. Knolle: Zur Geschichte der deutschen Höhlenkunde im Schatten des Nationalsozialismus – Mitt. Verb. dt. Höhlen- u. Karstforscher 36(1): 4–10 (1990)
- F. Knolle & B. Schütze: Dr. Benno Wolf, sein Umfeld und seine interdisziplinäre Wirkung – eine Klammer zwischen den deutschen Höhlenforscherverbänden – Mitt. Verb. dt. Höhlen- u. Karstforscher 51(2): 48–55 (2000)
- Wittenberger Museum. Lebenswerk eines Berliners. In: Neue Zeit, 17. Oktober 1951, S. 5
