= Anton Wilhelm Amo =

Ghanaian-German philosopher

- Born: c. 1703; Axim, Guinea, Dutch Gold Coast
- Died: c. 1759 (aged 55–56)
- Other names: Antonius Guilielmus Amo Afer; Anthony William Amo

Education
- Education: University of Helmstedt; University of Halle; University of Wittenberg
- Thesis: Disputatio Philosophica continens Ideam Distinctam Eorum quae competunt vel menti vel corpori nostro vivo et organico (1734)
- Academic advisors: Samuel Christian Hollmann; Martin Gotthelf Löscher

Philosophical work
- Era: Early modern philosophy
- Region: Western philosophy
- School: Age of Enlightenment; Rationalism
- Institutions: University of Halle; University of Jena
- Doctoral students: Johannes Theodosius Meiner
- Main interests: Philosophy of mind
- Notable ideas: Critique of Descartes's philosophy of mind

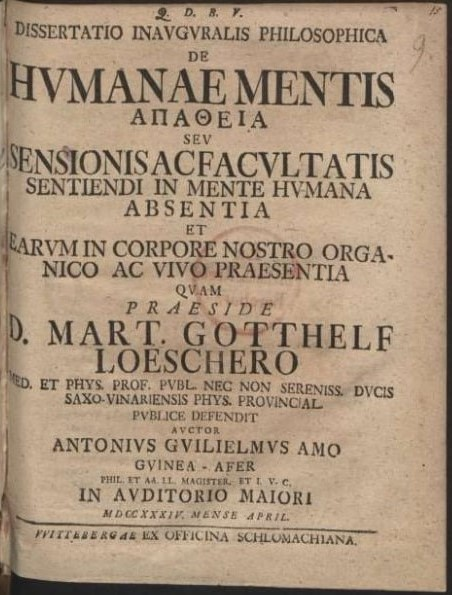
Title page of Amo's doctoral dissertation On the impassivity of the human mind (in Latin), Wittenberg, 1734

Anton Wilhelm Amo (c. 1703 – c. 1759) was a Nzema philosopher from Axim, Dutch Gold Coast then within what was broadly considered the region of Guinea (the area is now in Ghana).

Amo was a professor at the universities of Halle and Jena in Germany after studying at Halle. He was brought to Germany by the Dutch West India Company in 1707 and was presented as a gift to Dukes Augustus William and Ludwig Rudolf of Brunswick-Wolfenbüttel, being treated as a member of the family by their father Anthony Ulrich, Duke of Brunswick-Wolfenbüttel.

In 2020, Oxford University Press published an English translation of his philosophical works written in Latin from the early 1730s.

== Early life and education ==
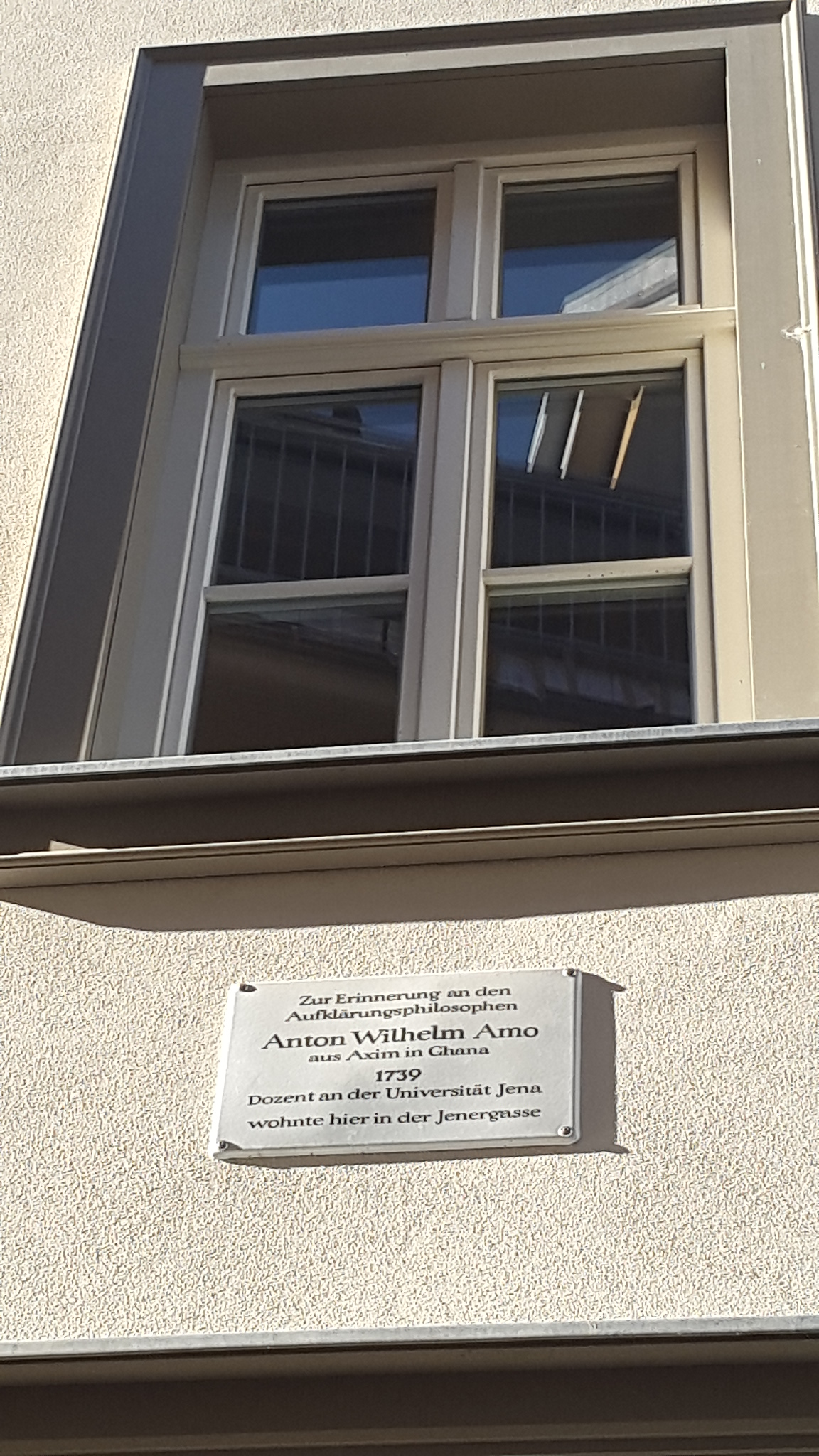
Memorial plaque for Anton Wilhelm Amo at Jenergasse 9, Jena. Photo 2018.

Amo was a Nzema (an Akan people). He was born in Axim in the Western region of present-day Ghana, but at the age of about four he was moved to Amsterdam by the Dutch West India Company. Some accounts say that he was enslaved, others that he was sent to Amsterdam by a preacher working in Ghana. Ultimately, it is unknown.

On 29 July 1708, Amo was baptised (and in 1721 confirmed) in the palace's chapel of Salzdahlum near Wolfenbüttel. In 1721 and 1725 he is mentioned as a servant to the Duke's family.

He went on to the University of Halle, whose Law School he entered in 1727. He finished his preliminary studies within two years, titling his thesis Dissertatio Inauguralis de Jure Maurorum in Europa (1729), 'On the Rights of Moors in Europe'. The thesis manuscript is lost, but a summary was published in the university's Annals (1730). To continue his studies, Amo moved to the University of Wittenberg, studying logic, metaphysics, physiology, astronomy, history, law, theology, politics, and medicine, and mastered six languages (English, French, Dutch, Latin, Greek, and German). His medical education, in particular, was to play a central role in much of his later philosophical thought.

Amo gained his doctorate in philosophy at Wittenberg in 1734; his thesis, Dissertatio Inauguralis Philosophica de Humanae Mentis Apatheia ('On the Absence of Sensation in the Human Mind and its Presence in our Organic and Living Body'), argued in favour of a broadly Cartesian dualist account of the person. Specifically, he accepts that the body and the mind should be understood as two different kinds substances, where the mind is an immaterial substance and the body is a material substance. However, he further argues sensations are received by the body, not the mind, and that the faculty of sensing also belongs to the body, not the mind. One example of an argument that Amo uses to show that it is the body, and not the mind, which senses goes as follows:

Whatever feels, lives; whatever lives, depends on nourishment; whatever lives and depends on nourishment grows; whatever is of this nature is in the end resolved into its basic principles; whatever comes to be resolved into its basic principles is a complex; every complex has its constituent parts; whatever this is true of is a divisible body. If therefore the human mind feels, it follows that it is a divisible body.

— On the Ἀπάθεια (Apatheia) of the Human Mind 2.1

Because (on Amo's account) the human mind is by definition immaterial and not a divisible body (On the Ἀπάθεια (Apatheia) of the Human Mind 1.3), it therefore cannot be the case that the mind itself senses.

== Philosophical career and later life ==
Amo returned to the University of Halle to lecture in philosophy under his preferred name of Antonius Guilielmus Amo Afer. In 1736, he moved to the University of Jena in a conditional role, pending nostrification tied to student attendance, rather than being made a professor outright. From his lectures, he produced his second major work in 1738, Treatise on the Art of Philosophising Soberly and Accurately, a 208-page compendium divided into a General Part (six chapters) and a Special Part (four sections containing twenty-two chapters). The work opens with what has been called the "Intentional Principle"—the thesis that every being apart from God is the effect of an intention carried forward to its end—which grounds Amo's classification of the sciences, his theory of truth, and his account of the mind's operations. The work also examines intellectual dishonesty, dogmatism, and prejudice, though these topics occupy only a small portion of the whole. The Tractatus is continuous with Amo's two 1734 dissertations (the Apatheia already refers to "our Logic"), and a recently discovered letter at the University of Tartu Library (dated March 24, 1736) suggests Amo may have sent the manuscript to the St. Petersburg Academy of Sciences as part of a job application.

In 1740, Amo took up a post in philosophy at the University of Jena, but while there he experienced a number of changes for the worse. The Duke of Brunswick-Wolfenbüttel had died in 1735, leaving him without his long-standing patron and protector. That coincided with social changes in Germany, which was becoming intellectually and morally narrower and less liberal. Those who argued against the secularisation of education (and against the rights of Africans in Europe) were regaining their ascendancy over those who campaigned for greater academic and social freedom, such as Christian Wolff.

Amo was subjected to an unpleasant campaign by some of his enemies, including a public lampoon staged at a theatre in Halle. He finally decided to return to the land of his birth. He set sail on a Dutch West India Company ship to Ghana via Guinea, arriving in about 1747; his father and a sister were still living there. His life from then on becomes more obscure. According to at least one report, he was taken to a Dutch fortress, Fort San Sebastian in Shama, in the 1750s, possibly to prevent him sowing dissent amongst the people. The exact date, place, and manner of his death are unknown, though he probably died in about 1759 at the fort in Shama in Ghana.

== Legacy ==
In Stuttgart, an Anton Wilhelm Amo Square in front of the Stuttgart Labour Court was dedicated in 2022. At the end of January 2023, the square formerly known as "Lerchenplätzle" in front of the Stuttgart Labour Court in Johannesstraße was renamed "Anton-Wilhelm-Amo-Platz". In August 2020, in a context of "decolonization" of place names perceived to have racist origins, officials in the German capital Berlin proposed renaming Mohrenstraße to "Anton-Wilhelm-Amo-Straße" in his honor; the change was put into place in August 2025 after a lengthy legal battle.

In 2024, two museum exhibitions were held in Germany that focused exclusively on Anton Wilhelm Amo: "Focus on Amo. Pictures for a Scholar" in the Löwengebäude of the University in Halle/Saale and the exhibition "Anton Wilhelm Amo - Between the Worlds" at the Museum of Municipal Collections in the Zeughaus in Lutherstadt Wittenberg. The curator of this exhibition was the ethnologist Nils Seethaler.

== Works ==
- Dissertatio inauguralis de iure maurorum in Europa, 1729 (lost). Translated title: Inaugural dissertation on the laws of the Moors in Europe.
- Dissertatio inauguralis philosophica de humanae mentis apatheia, Wittenberg, 1734. Inaugural dissertation on the impassivity of the human mind.
- Disputatio philosophica continens ideam distinctam eorum quae competunt vel menti vel corpori nostro vivo et organico, Wittenberg, 1734 (Ph.D. thesis). Philosophical discourse presenting ("containing") a distinct idea of what belongs either to the mind or to our living and organic body.
- Tractatus de arte sobrie et accurate philosophandi, 1738. Treatise on the art of philosophising soberly and precisely.
- Anton Wilhelm Amo's Philosophical Dissertations on Mindy and Body. Edited, translated and with an introduction by Stephen Menn and Justin E.H. Smith. Oxford: Oxford University Press, 2020.
