= Robert Hartmann =

Robert Hartmann may refer to:

- Robert Hartmann (naturalist) (1832–1893), German naturalist, anatomist, and ethnographer
- Robert Hartmann (referee) (born 1979), German referee
- Robert T. Hartmann (1917–2008), American political advisor, speechwriter and reporter

== See also ==
- Hartmann
- Robert S. Hartman (1910–1973), German-American logician and philosopher
