= Morschen =

- Municipality
- Coat of arms

- Location of Morschen within Schwalm-Eder-Kreis district
- Interactive map of Morschen
- Location within Germany Location within Hesse
- Coordinates: 51°03′N 09°36′E
- Country: Germany
- State: Hesse
- Admin. region: Kassel
- District: Schwalm-Eder-Kreis

Government
  - Mayor (2022–28): Roland Zobel (FDP)

Area
  - Total: 47.94 km^{2} (18.51 sq mi)
- Elevation: 201 m (659 ft)

Population (2025-12-31)
  - Total: 3,080
  - Density: 64.2/km^{2} (166/sq mi)
- Time zone: UTC+01:00 (CET)
  - Summer (DST): UTC+02:00 (CEST)
- Postal codes: 34326
- Dialling codes: 05664
- Vehicle registration: HR
- Website: www.morschen.de

Morschen is a municipality in the Schwalm-Eder district of Hesse, Germany.

== Geography ==
=== Location ===
Morschen lies in the Fulda valley south of Kassel.

=== Constituent communities ===
The community consists of the centres of Altmorschen (administrative seat), Binsförth, Eubach, Heina, Konnefeld, Neumorschen and Wichte.

== Politics ==
Morschen's municipal council is made up of 23 members.

- CDU 5 seats
- SPD 14 seats
- FDP 4 seats

(as of municipal elections held on 26 March 2006)

== Culture and sights ==
The entire municipality of Morschen has a wide range of historical and cultural sights. The Haydau Monastery, the historic market street in Neumorschen, the late Baroque manor house "Altes Forstamt" and the Jewish cemetery in Binsförth are particularly noteworthy. The fire brigade museum in Altmorschen and the Wichte local history museum provide information on regional history. The local archive also has a local history exhibition.

=== Altmorschen ===
==== Altmorschen railway station ====
The building, opened in the 1860s, is one of the few restored examples of a Gründerzeit railway station made of red brick (for almost 80 years, like almost all similar stations in Germany, it was whitewashed in the style of the New Objectivity).

==== Old Forestry Office ====
The building, which is also known as the "post office" because of its former function, is a stately late Baroque half-timbered house from the 17th century. The preserved cellars, however, date back to the 13th century. Today it houses a hotel and gastronomy open to the public.

==== Morschen Town Hall ====
The town hall is housed in the former Raabe farm in the centre of the historic village of Altmorschen. It is an 18th-century half-timbered house with modern extensions.

==== Old School ====
The oldest school building in Morschen and one of the oldest in northern Hesse was built in the early 18th century as a half-timbered structure. The building served as a primary school until the 1960s. In the 19th century, it also housed the forestry school.

==== Old Village Church ====
Situated in the upper village of Altmorschen, only the tower of the church from around 1200 has been preserved and was still used for church services until very recently. The ruins are surrounded by a cemetery with historic gravestones.

==== Fire Brigade Museum ====
The museum outside the old town houses exhibits of regional fire brigade history since the 19th century.

==== Haydau Monastery ====
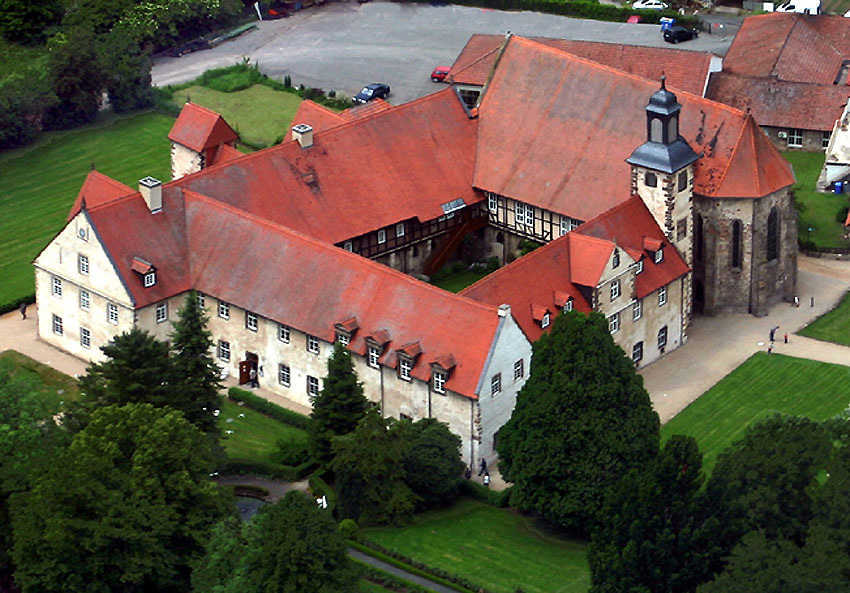
Haydau Monastery 2005

Haydau Monastery, a former Cistercian nunnery, built in the mid-13th to early 14th centuries and converted into a landgravial castle in the mid-16th and 17th centuries. From 1985 to 2001, the convent was secured and renovated in a model project. Kloster Haydau, a former Cistercian convent, was built between the mid 13th century and the early 14th century, and in the mid 16th century and 17th century it was converted into a stately home for a Landgrave. Today, the building is used for meetings and conventions, as a gallery, a meeting place for professors, and a venue for poetry readings.

Under the motto Life - Encounters - Perspectives, Haydau Monastery is now used for conferences, congresses, art, culture, weddings and family celebrations. Every year, many guests attend concerts, exhibitions, seminars, theatre, readings, symposia, as well as many families and young couples celebrate their personal celebrations in the rooms of the monastery.

==== Waltari-Bergmann-Platz ====
Located in the centre of Altmorschen, the square was inaugurated in 2018 to mark the centenary of the birth of the historian and honorary citizen of Morschen, Waltari Bergmann. There is a monument on the square in honour of the man who gave it its name.

==== Kapellenberg ====
According to tradition, Boniface founded his first chapel on the hill marked by a wooden cross. It is an important testimony to early Christianisation in Germany.

==== Local Archives ====
In the former Schröder House, part of the Haydau domain, rooms have been created to house the local archive, as well as exhibition and meeting rooms. The archive is open to the public by appointment. The exhibition is dedicated to the Rührfix as an important contemporary historical product for Morschen.

==== Community and school library ====
The library is open to the public three days a week. It is located in the building of the Georg-August-Zinn-School.

=== Neumorschen ===
==== Dorfaue Neumorschen ====
Along the historically significant Marktstraße are mainly gabled half-timbered houses from the 17th and 18th centuries, with the historic Ratskeller from the 17th century with its ridge turret standing out in particular. Another striking half-timbered house from the late 18th century is the Horn Inn, where both the local heritage society (1908) and the shooting club (1928) were founded. It has been sat empty for years after the death of the last operator J. Priller in 2010, following several changes of ownership. An open water channel runs along the Marktstraße. In 2012, the 20th century pavilion standing in the middle of the street was restored.

==== Wehrkirche (Neumorschen) ====
The fieldstone building in Neumorschen, dating from the early 13th century, is the oldest church in Morschen, founded on a late Romanesque choir tower and surrounded by a 15th-century fortified churchyard. The embrasures in the circular wall still bear witness to this today. A romantic organ with ornate carvings on the facade was installed in 1730.

==== Heckenmühle ====
The "Heckenmühle" in Neumorschen is a half-timbered building from the early 17th century, first mentioned in 1618. It is an important testimony to regional economic history.

==== Obermühle Neumorschen ====
The Obermühle in Neumorschen is a water mill on the banks of the Fulda that was in operation until 1958. The building is a half-timbered house whose core dates back to the 16th century and has been documented as a mill for just as long.

==== Ferry port ====
There are rafts (by arrangement) on the Fulda from Morschen to Melsungen.

=== Heina ===
==== Historical centre of Heina ====
Half-timbered houses from the 17th, 18th and 19th centuries are grouped around a medieval fortified church made of brick. In keeping with the rural character of the village, the buildings are adjoined by farms, some of which are still in use today. A stone court table has been preserved near the church.

==== Summit cross ====
According to regional tradition, Boniface preached south of Heina on an exposed hill high above the Fulda valley in 723 AD. Due to the crowds at his sermon, this field is called "Gedränge". An oak tree that grew on this spot is said to have been felled by Boniface. In memory of this, a new oak tree was planted in 2001 and a memorial stone with a commemorative plaque was erected. A new wooden summit cross was erected for devotions at Easter 2012. The Way of St. James leads past the cross.

==== Wildsberghütte ====
The log cabin, which is frequented as a barbecue site and excursion destination, stands on a hill halfway between Heina and Beiseförth (Malsfeld). From there, a good view of the Fulda valley at the foot of the Wildsberg opens up.

=== Konnefeld ===
==== Court square and fortified church ====
The late Gothic fortified church (15th century) stands in the centre of the half-timbered village, surrounded by a historic cemetery which served as a court square until the 19th century. Due to the rarely good preservation of its architecture and the characteristic village lime trees, it is considered a prime example of such an institution in northern Hesse.

=== Wichte ===
==== Wichte local history museum ====
Since 2019, the museum, run by an association, has housed regional collections on folklore and geology (fossils) in an 18th-century half-timbered house. It is embedded in the historic centre of Wichte.

=== Binsförth ===
==== Jewish cemetery ====
The oldest Jewish cemetery in Northern Hesse is located in the Binsförth district. 256 gravestones dating from 1694 to 1937 are present in the 5540 m² cemetery.

==== Binsförth Castle ====
The core of the farmstead, also known as a knight's estate, dates back to the 13th century. It is currently managed by an organic farm. Public events are held on the grounds every year.

=== Eubach ===
==== Eubach village church ====
The village church of Eubach dates back to the High Middle Ages and is particularly distinguished by its location on a hill.

==== Deserted Schönewald with church ruins ====
Schönewald is a settlement founded in the Middle Ages. It was destroyed and abandoned during the Thirty Years' War. In recent decades, the stone foundations of the houses have been uncovered and can be visited; especially the ruins of the old village church stand out.

=== Natural monuments/trees worth seeing ===
- Historical lime tree ( natural monument, on the Halberge, Neumorschen).
- Giant sequoia (Am Galgenbusch, Altmorschen)
- Giant sequoia (Obere Straße, Heina)

The tree stands on the edge of the village in an open field. It was planted in the second half of the 20th century and is one of the rare examples of these giant North American trees in northern Hesse.

- Bonifatius Oak (Im Gedränge, Heina)
- Mord-Buche (Wildsbergweg, Heina)

The Mord-Buche, a dead tree rib, was witness to a historical murder case of the early 19th century reconstructed by Waltari Bergmann. After the dead tree fell, the information board was attached to a beech tree standing next to it and an information board was added. The site is located halfway between Heina and Beiseförth (Malsfeld).

== Economy and infrastructure ==
=== Transport ===
Morschen lies on Federal Highway (Bundesstraße) B 83 (Kassel – Bebra). The Malsfeld Autobahn interchange (83) on the A 7 (Kassel – Würzburg) is about 11 km away.

The community belongs to the North Hesse Transport Network.

== Personalities ==
=== People who lived in Morschen ===
- Johann Sutel (around 1504–1575), Protestant theologian and reformer, born in Morschen
- August Heinzerling (1899–1989), inventor of the RÜHRFIX, lived in Morschen
- Eugen Mahler (1927–2019), artist and professor at the University of Kassel for psychoanalysis and group dynamics, lived in Morschen
- Nils Seethaler (* 1981), cultural anthropologist

=== Honorary citizens ===
- 1981: Waltari Bergmann (1918–2000), rector
- 1997: Gottfried Kiesow, German memorial protector.
- 2001: Ludwig Georg Braun (* 1943), German entrepreneur
