= Nils Seethaler =

German cultural anthropologist

Nils Seethaler (born August 18, 1981, in West Berlin) is a German cultural anthropologist. He researches historical collections of ethnological objects and human remains.

== Personal life ==
Nils Seethaler was born in Berlin-Lichterfelde and spent his youth in Berlin, Rocky Point (Australia) and in Morschen in northern Hesse (Germany). After graduating from the Elisabeth Knipping School in Kassel in 2000, Seethaler studied at the Freie Universität Berlin Ethnology with Georg Pfeffer and Markus Schindlbeck, literary studies with Ulrich Profitlich and Volker Mertens and political science with Fritz Vilmar and Walter Rothholz. Since 2012 he has been coordinating the archive of the Berlin Society for Anthropology, Ethnology and Prehistory at the Archaeological Center of the Staatliche Museen zu Berlin. Seethaler lives and works in Berlin. He is married and has a daughter and a son.

== Research ==
Seethaler was involved in numerous projects, in particular to research historical ethnological collections. In particular, this includes provenance research on human remains . In addition to examining possible contexts of injustice in collections from the colonial and Nazi era, he researches the history, motifs and social mechanisms of collecting, particularly non-European cultural goods, up to the present day. His provenance research on the skulls of indigenous Australians in the anthropological collection of the Berlin Society for Anthropology, Ethnology and Prehistory and from Australia and Namibia in the collections of the Charité in the "Charité human remains project" formed the start of a broad study of the origins of human remains in German museums and collections. This research formed a basis for the creation of a uniform guideline for dealing with human remains in public collections in Germany. In this context there was restitution of skulls to the countries of origin. The rediscovery of four presumably indigenous skulls from Canada, in which Seethaler was involved in his role as archive director, also attracted international attention in 2020. The Canadian doctor William Osler brought the skulls to Germany at the end of the 19th century and gave them to Rudolf Virchow in Berlin. In addition to his work with historical collections, Seethaler was involved in a number of interdisciplinary research at the interface between the humanities and the natural sciences. In 2010, together with Carsten Niemitz and Benjamin P. Lange, he organized the 11th Annual Conference on "Human Behavior in Evolutionary Perspective" in Berlin.

== Exhibition projects ==
Seethaler advised, organized and directed numerous museum exhibition projects on ethnological, art-historical and natural science topics. In these exhibitions, innovative ways of exhibiting ethnological objects and conveying ethnological content in museums were presented in particular. His initiative is essentially the rediscovery and redevelopment of the lost Museum für Völkerkunde Rostock, as well as the preservation and redesign of the Julius Riemer Collection in Lutherstadt Wittenberg (the only ethnographic museum in Saxony-Anhalt) as a museum institution, the expansion of which he supported by arranging donations from the Rainer Greschik collection. The opening of the cross-cultural exhibition "Objects of Adoration" ("Objekte der Verehrung") conceived by Seethaler was the finale of the internationally received events for the Reformation anniversary in 2017 in Lutherstadt Wittenberg.

== Collection projects ==
Seethaler undertook various research and collecting trips to Australia, to Oceania, to the Near East and through Europe. During these collecting trips, but especially through contacts with collectors in Europe, the USA and Australia he brought together several thousand ethnological pieces; plus a similarly extensive collection of ethnological photographs with examples from the 19th century to the present day. Objects from the collections compiled by Seethaler were sent to various museums, including the Ethnological Museum of Berlin, the Museum Europäischer Kulturen, the Museum of Municipal Collections in the Zeughaus in Lutherstadt Wittenberg, to the East Prussian State Museum in Lüneburg and to the Hermann Bahner collection in the Museum Altes Rathaus in Langen (Hessen).
