= Samuel Christian Hollmann =

German philosopher (1696–1787)

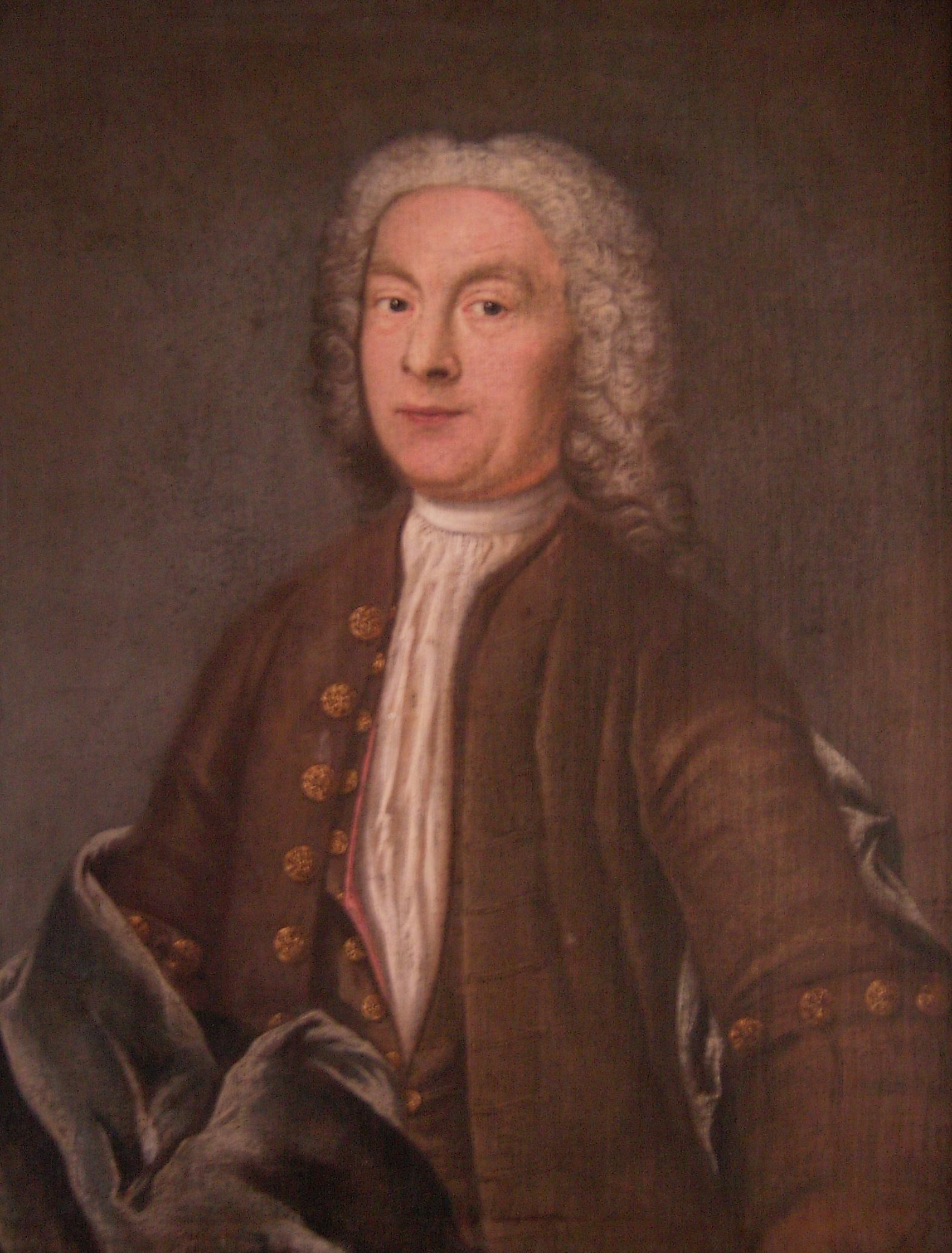
- Painting of Hollmann from the Städtisches Museum Göttingen
- Born: December 3, 1696; Szczecin, Swedish Pomerania
- Died: 4 September 1787 (aged 90); Göttingen, Electorate of Hanover

Samuel Christian Hollmann (1696–1787) was a German philosopher. Between 1750 and 1776, Hollmann published numerous volumes in the fields of logic and medicine.

== Biography ==
Samuel Christian Hollmann was born in 1696 in Szczecin.

In 1730, Hollmann worked as a supervisor to Anton Wilhelm Amo both during his work at the University of Wittenberg, and a few months later when Hollman was appointed to the newly opened University of Göttingen.

Hollmann was Henry Muhlenberg's professor of logic.

== Legacy ==
In 2003, Martin Stuber described Samuel Christian Hollmann's theory of earthquakes as Aristotelian and unpopular amongst his peers; specifically Stuber stated that "vague theories of subterranean caverns and explosive materials were... the starting point for precautionary measures suggested in 1756 by Gottingen professor of philosophy, Samuel Christian Hollmann, to prevent further earth quakes. His idea was to bore thin vertical shafts down to the underground caverns to draw off any explosive vapours. However, it found little favour, also in [his] correspondence" with Swiss physiologist Albrecht von Haller. In 2005, however, Hubert Steinke stated that von Haller "named his friend and professor of philosophy, Samuel Christian Hollmann as the only non-student witness" to Haller's experiments.

In 2020, Stephen Menn wrote that Hollman was critical of Gottfried Leibniz's theory of pre-established harmony; specifically Menn described Hollmann as "a young critic of the Leibnizian-Wolffian doctrine of preestablished harmony, who in... 1730 had published at Wittenberg a book entitled On Philosophical Reformation (De reformatione philosophica), which is basically Cartesian in its approach to theory construction and its core philosophical commitments."

== Bibliography ==
- De stupendo naturae mysterio, anima humana sibi ipsi ignota. Bossigel, Göttingen 1750. (Digitalisat Teil 1), (Teil 2,1), (Teil 2,2), (Teil 2,3), (Teil 2,4), (Teil 2,5)
- Commentatio Philosophica De Harmonia Inter Animam Et Corpus Praestabilita. Gerdes, Wittenberg 1724. (Digitalisat)
- Epistolae amoebaeae de harmonia praestabilita inter virum clarissimum Georg Bernh. Bülfingerum et Sam. Christ. Hollmannum junctim editae. Frankfurt und Leipzig 1738. (Digitalisat)
- Institutiones philosophicae. Bruhn, Wittenberg 1727–1734. 3 Teile. (Digitalisat Teil 1), (Teil 2)
- De reformatione philosophica condendisque libris in philosophia symbolicis dissertationes duae. Eichsfeld, Wittenberg 1730. (Digitalisat Band 1)
- De vera philosophiae notione, Eichsfeld, Wittenberg 1731, 1733. (Digitalisat der Ausg. 1731)
- Paulo Uberior in universam philosophiam introductio, Fritsch, Wittenberg 1734. (Digitalisat Band 2)
- Dissertatio Philosophica, De Definiendis Jvstis Scientiarvm Philosophicarvm Limitibvs.Hager, Göttingen 1736
- Philosophia rationalis, quae logica vulgo dicitur, paulo uberioris in universam philosophiam introductionis. Vandenhoeck, Göttingen 1746. (Digitalisat)
- Institutiones pneumatologiae et theologia naturalis, 1747
- Prima philosophia, qvae metaphysica vvlgo dicitvr, mvltvm avcta et emendata. Vandenhoeck, Göttingen 1747. (Digitalisat Teil 2)
- Philosophia moralis seu ethicae, Göttingen 1768
- Jurisprudentiae naturalis primae lineae. Vandenhoeck, Göttingen 1751 und 1768. (Digitalisat der Ausg. 1751)
- Illorum, que per universa philosophiam ab ipsomet reperta sunt, anacephalaiosis, Göttingen 1781
- Primæ Physicæ Experimentalis Lineæ . Hager, Göttingen 1742. (Digitalisat)
- Philosophiæ Natvralis Primæ Lineæ. Vandenhoeck, Göttingen 1749, 1753, 1766. (Digitalisat der Ausg. 1749)
- Sylloge Commentationum, Göttingen 1762, 1775, ed. nova 1784
- Zufälligen Gedanken über verschiedene Materien, 6. Sammlung 1776
