= Benno Wolf =

German judge

Benno Wolf (26 September 1871 – 6 January 1943) was a German judge and a pioneer speleologist. He was a co-founder of the German Society for Mammalogy and has been considered one of the founders of conservation in Prussia. He did the essential preparatory work for the German Reichnaturschutzgesetz (Nature Conservation Act) (RNG) of 26 June 1935 (RGBl. I p. 821) that for the first time in Germany regulated the official issues of nature conservation, defined protection zones and introduced the concept of landscape protection area. The Nazi government arrested him for having Jewish ancestry and he died in the Theresienstadt concentration camp.

Wolf was born in 1871 in Dresden. He was baptized Protestant but came from a well-known Jewish physician family of Dr Richard Wolf. He was tutored at home and sent to Switzerland in 1881 to learn French. He went to a boarding school in Weinheim in 1883 and then at Wiesbaden and Dresden. He studied law at Freiburg, Munich and Berlin and earned a doctorate from the University of Leipzig in 1895. After work as a legal clerk, he became a judge at Elberfeld and became a District Judge at Berlin-Charlottenburg in 1912. He was involved in amending conservation laws and in strengthening laws to protect wilderness. He was involved in the creation of the first Prussian Nature Conservation Act of 1920. He worked with the Brandenburg Commission for Nature Preservation but he was removed from all position in 1933 due to his Jewish ancestry.

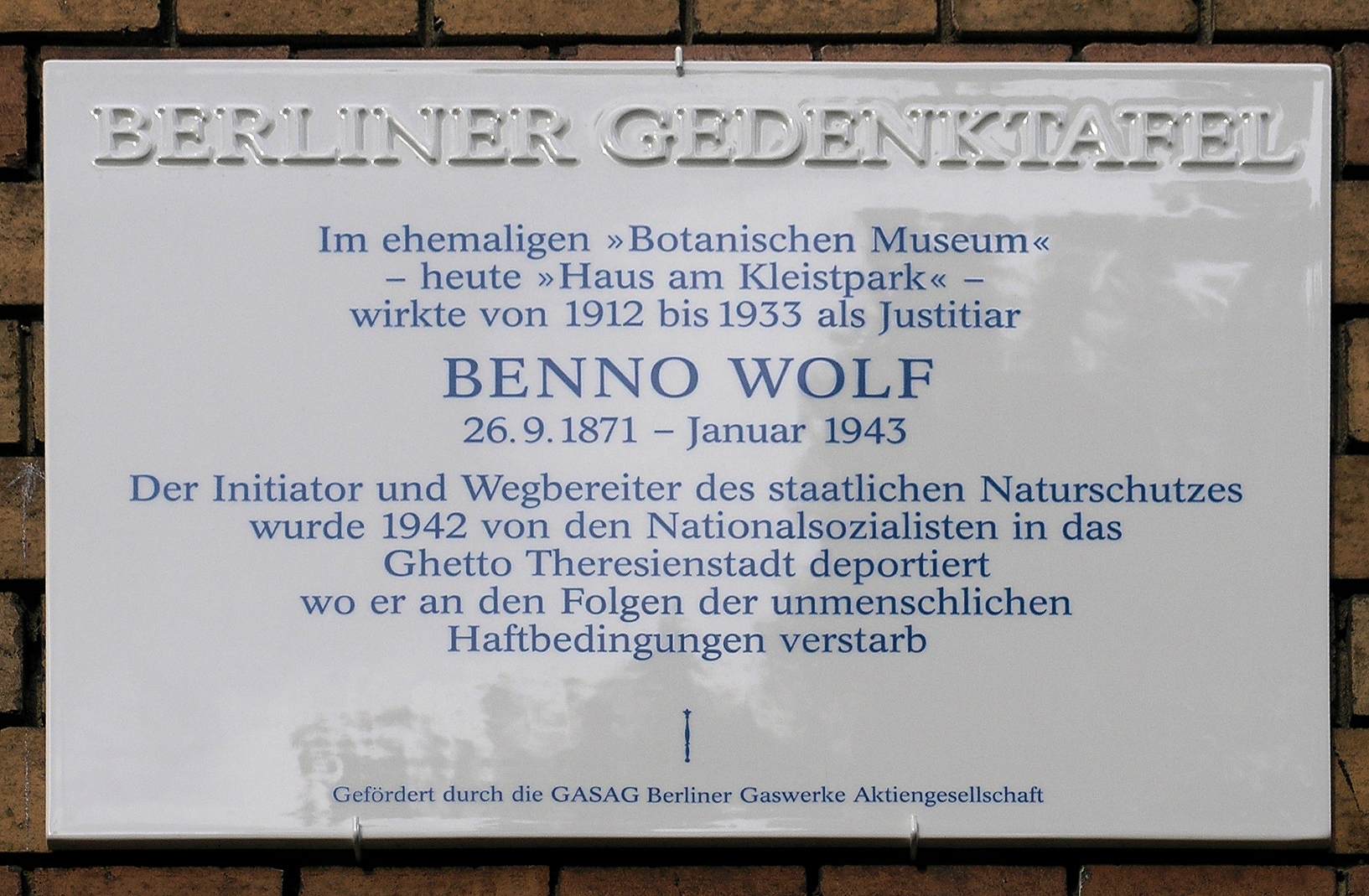
Memorial plaque in Berlin. Location: 52°29′26″N 13°21′26″E

Wolf was also a keen mountaineer and speleologist and was a member of the Hauptverband Deutscher Höhlenforscher (Association of German Speleologists), serving as its founding president. Wolf began to maintain a database of all the world's caves and for this he had amassed numerous books and documents in his library. After being removed from work, he was aided by Julius Riemer to continue to serve as an editor of the speleologists newsletter, "Mitteilungen über Höhlen- und Karstforschung." Julius Riemer was Benno Wolf's closest friend and most active patron after his professional ban. From 1937 on, he took over the editorship of the main association journal; for a time he was also acting main association chairman. He tried desperately to save Wolf from deportation, but ultimately failed. The Nazi research wing, the SS Ahnenerbe, became interested in caves as potential bomb shelters and on 6 July 1942, they arrested Wolf and deported him to the Theresienstadt concentration camp. He died on 6 January 1943. Recent research suggests that Riemer had been asked by the Gestapo to keep in touch with Benno Wolf to prevent the latter from destroying his database of caves. In 1955, the Dr. Benno Wolf Prize was established in speleology. A memorial plaque was placed on his former home at Hornstraße 6 in Berlin-Kreuzberg in 2005 along with a paving stone in his memory.
