= Berliner Gesellschaft für Anthropologie, Ethnologie und Urgeschichte =

- Abbreviation: BGAEU
- Formation: 1869; 157 years ago as Berliner Anthropologische Gesellschaft
- Purpose: Advancement of anthropology, ethnology, and prehistory
- Headquarters: Museum für Vor- und Frühgeschichte (Berlin)
- Website: www.bgaeu.de

The Berlin Society for Anthropology, Ethnology, and Prehistory (German: Berliner Gesellschaft für Anthropologie, Ethnologie und Urgeschichte) is a learned society for the study of anthropology, ethnology, and prehistory founded in Berlin by Adolf Bastian and Rudolf Virchow in 1869 as the Berlin Anthropological Society (German: Berliner Anthropologische Gesellschaft).

== History ==
Rudolf Virchow founded the ‘’Berlin Anthropological Society‘’ in November 1869 together with Adolf Bastian and Robert Hartmann, from which the ‘’Berlin Society for Anthropology, Ethnology and Prehistory‘’ emerged. As a national organization, the German Society for Anthropology, Ethnology and Prehistory was founded in 1870, but dissolved in 1935. Before the inflation after the First World War, the company had considerable assets, which were gained from well-known foundations, such as that of Heinrich Schliemann. This made it possible for the company to financially support expeditions and excavations. Numerous holdings in Berlin museums go back to earlier research by the company and some of them are still legally owned by the company.

After the Second World War, the company was temporarily dissolved by the Allies and re-established in the early 1950s, particularly on the initiative of Hans Nevermann.

== Current activities ==
Since then, the company has been organizing lectures, excursions and forums on a regular basis and promoting the exchange between scientists from different disciplines. The society annually awards the Rudolf Virchow Prize for excellent master's, master's and diploma theses from universities in Berlin and Brandenburg relating to the subjects represented in the society.

== Archive ==
The archive of the BGAEU holds historical archival material on the activities of the society and on the history of the scientific disciplines it represents. It preserves the estates of important personalities such as Arthur Baessler, Hans Grimm, Rudolf Virchow and Alfred Maaß, as well as extensive collections of original historical photographs, which are in the care of the Ethnological Museum Berlin, the Museum of Asian Art Berlin and the Museum of European Cultures. The archive is located in the Archaeological Centre of the Berlin State Museums and is open to the public by appointment. The head of the archive is Nils Seethaler.

== Rudolf Virchow Collection ==
The Society owns an internationally outstanding collection of physical-anthropological specimens. It bears Rudolf Virchow's name, as it was largely compiled during Virchow's lifetime and at his instigation. It includes skulls and other skeletal parts from numerous non-European countries and partly also from Europe. Most of the items in the collection date from the 19th century. There are also archaeological finds, particularly from Egypt, Europe and Latin America.

In the past, representatives of the BGAEU have been accused of handling parts of the anthropological collection uncritically and avoiding the post-colonial discourse in public. Under the chairmanship of Elke Kaiser since 2020, however, a critical and transparent approach to the specialist community has increasingly prevailed, especially with regard to those parts of the anthropological collection that originate from non-archaeological and presumably colonial contexts.

== Presidents (selection) ==
Throughout the history of the society, there have repeatedly been historical figures of international significance serving as its presidents (chairpersons):

Rudolf Virchow (1869–1872), Adolf Bastian (1873), Heinrich Ernst Beyrich (1884), Wilhelm Reiss (1888), Heinrich Wilhelm Waldeyer (1892), Abraham Lissauer (1905–1907), Karl von den Steinen (1908–1910), Eduard Seler (1914–1916), Carl Schuchhardt (1917–1919), Eugen Fischer (1932–1937), Diedrich Westermann (1938–1941), Wilhelm Unverzagt (1942–1944), Otmar Freiherr von Verschuer (1945), Hans Nevermann (1951–1954), Günther Hartmann (1980–1983), Bernhard Hänsel (1984–1986), Georg Pfeffer (1992-1995), Hartmut Zinser (2002–2004), Carsten Niemitz (2008–2010), Wolfram Schier (2014–2017), Raiko Krauss (2023-2026)
