= Carsten Niemitz =

German scientist

Carsten Niemitz (born 29 September 1945 in Dessau) is a German anatomist, ethologist, and human evolutionary biologist.

== Life and work ==
Niemitz studied biology, mathematics, medicine and art history at the Universities of Giessen, Freiburg, Göttingen and at the Free University of Berlin. He graduated in Biology in 1970. From 1968 to 1971 he was employed at the Max Planck Institute for Brain Research in Frankfurt. He spent the years 1971 to 1973 in the jungle of Sarawak on Borneo. After returning to Germany he was awarded his doctorate in biology in 1974. In 1975 he qualified to teach anatomy and until 1978 was lecturer at the Anatomical Institute of the University of Göttingen. At the age of 32 he was appointed Professor of Human Biology at the Free University of Berlin, a post he held as head of the Institute until 2010. In 1987 he was consultant to the IUCN as a member of the Species Survival Commission. In 1993 he was appointed as professor of zoology at the University of Essen and was a visiting professor of Systematic Zoology and Evolutionary Biology at the University of Potsdam. During a research trip in 1991 to Sulawesi, he discovered the primate Tarsius dianae. In 1996 he introduced in the Anthropological Society a proposal to ban the use of the term "race", which was later adopted officially by the society.

In addition to his field research on primates and the study of biomechanics, one of his research interests was the origin of language and writing, with investigation into communication amongst anthropoid apes. He was one of those who regarded facial expressions and gestures as a precursor of human writing skills. In brief, his thesis was that the abilities to read and write are biologically older than those of language, because such visual communication was later supplemented by vocal and acoustic signals.

In the late eighties and the nineties he was one of those who raised the alarm about the depletion of tropical rain forests.

In 2000, Niemitz presented his "amphibious generalist theory" of the evolution of the upright human posture and bipedalism, according to which "during one period of our evolution it was precisely wading and the use of shore zones that sustainably and significantly shaped modern humans." He firmly rejects the far more far-reaching aquatic ape theory of hominisation.

His practical experience in this area stems not only from anatomical work and field studies but also from research expeditions, for example to the Amazon basin and the congo Basin. The evolutionary theory was adapted into a film in 2011.

Since 2010 Niemitz also became known for his forensic publications. Since 2017, he has been active primarily as an environmentalist. At the invitation of the Bibliographisches Institut (Mannheim–Leipzig), Niemitz authored all anthropological articles in the final edition of the Brockhaus Enzyklopädie across all 30 volumes. In 2014, Niemitz introduced a new forensic method to prove the singularity of a suspect. Since 2017, he has been active primarily as an environmentalist. His list of publications comprises well over 400 titles, including a considerable number of books. In addition, he has worked as a textbook translator and as a radio, film, and television author. Since 2025, Niemitz lives in Switzerland.

== Memberships ==
From 1992 Niemitz was deputy chairman, from 1994 to 1998 chairman of the Anthropological Society and from 2008 to 2010 chairman of the Berlin Society for Anthropology, Ethnology and Prehistory (BGAEU). From 1992 to 2014, he was deputy chairman of the Urania cultural community in Berlin, a center for the exchange between science and the public. Together with Nils Seethaler and Benjamin P. Lange he organized the 11th MVE annual conference in Berlin in 2010. He has been since 2013 Patron of the friends' association of the Julius Riemer collection in the Museum of the Municipal Collections in the "Armory" (Museum der städtischen Sammlungen im Zeughaus) in Lutherstadt Wittenberg.

== Works ==
- Zur Biometrie der Gattung Tarsius Storr, 1780 (Tarsiiformes, Tarsiidae). Eine funktionsmorphologische Studie als Beitrag zur Systematik und Phylogenie der Koboldmakis unter Verwendung elektronischer Rechenmittel mit dem Versuch einer Synopse morphologischer und ethologischer Ergebnisse. Dissertation, Gießen 1974
- Zur Funktionsmorphologie und Biometrie der Gattung Tarsius Storr, 1780 (Mammalia, Primates, Tarsiidae). Herleitung von Evolutionsmechanismen bei einem Primaten. Courier Forschungsinstitut Senckenberg 25, 1977
- Niemitz, Carsten (1984). Biology of Tarsiers. Jena: Gustav Fischer Verlag. ISBN 978-0-89574-182-0.
- Erbe und Umwelt. Zur Natur von Anlage und Selbstbestimmung des Menschen. Verlag Suhrkamp, Frankfurt am Main, 1987, ISBN 978-3-518-28246-5, 2. Auflage, 1989
- Das Regenwaldbuch. Verlag Parey, Berlin und Hamburg 1990, ISBN 978-3-489-53434-1
- Niemitz, C. (2010). "The evolution of the upright posture and gait--a review and a new synthesis". Die Naturwissenschaften. 97 (3): 241–263. Bibcode:2010NW.....97..241N. doi:10.1007/s00114-009-0637-3. PMC 2819487. PMID 20127307.
- mit Sigrun Niemitz: Genforschung und Gentechnik. Ängste und Hoffnungen. Springer Verlag, Berlin 1999
- Niemitz, Carsten (2002). "A theory on the evolution of the habitual orthograde human bipedalism—the 'Amphibische Generalistentheorie'". Anthropologischer Anzeiger. 60 (1): 3–66. doi:10.1127/anthranz/60/2002/3. PMID 12058577.
- Das Geheimnis des aufrechten Gangs. Unsere Evolution verlief anders. C.H. Beck, München 2004, ISBN 978-3-406-51606-1
- Brennpunkte und Perspektiven der aktuellen Anthropologie = Focuses and perspectives of modern physical anthropology. Verlag Leidorf, 2006, ISBN 978-3-86757-141-8, ISBN 978-3-86757-141-8
- mit K. Kreutz und H. Walther: "Wider den Rassenbegriff in der Anwendung auf den Menschen". Anthropologischer Anzeiger 64, Nr. 4 (2006): 463–464

== Film ==
- Das Geheimnis des aufrechten Gangs. Dokumentarfilm, Deutschland, 2011, 43 Min., Regie: Ingo Knopf, Jo Siegler, Produktion: Maakii Filmproduktion, WDR, arte (Inhaltsangabe von arte)
