= Altmorschen =

Coordinates: 51°04′N 9°37′E

Altmorschen is a village in the municipality of Morschen, Schwalm-Eder-Kreis in the German state of Hesse. As of 2014, it has 1,430 inhabitants, making it the most populous village in Morschen. It is also the oldest village of the municipality, being mentioned as far back as 1235, and serves as the capital of Morschen.

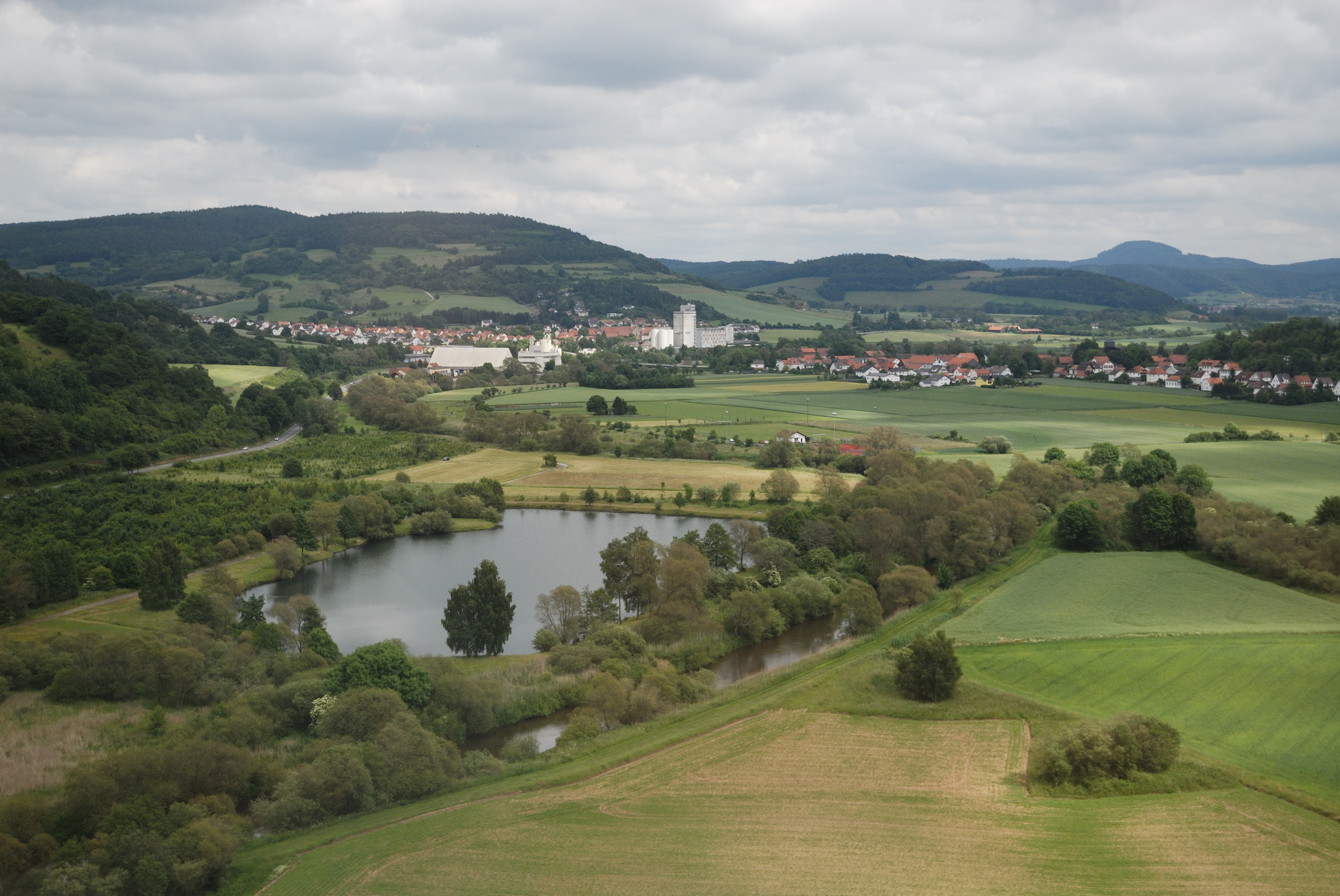
Altmorschen from the ICE

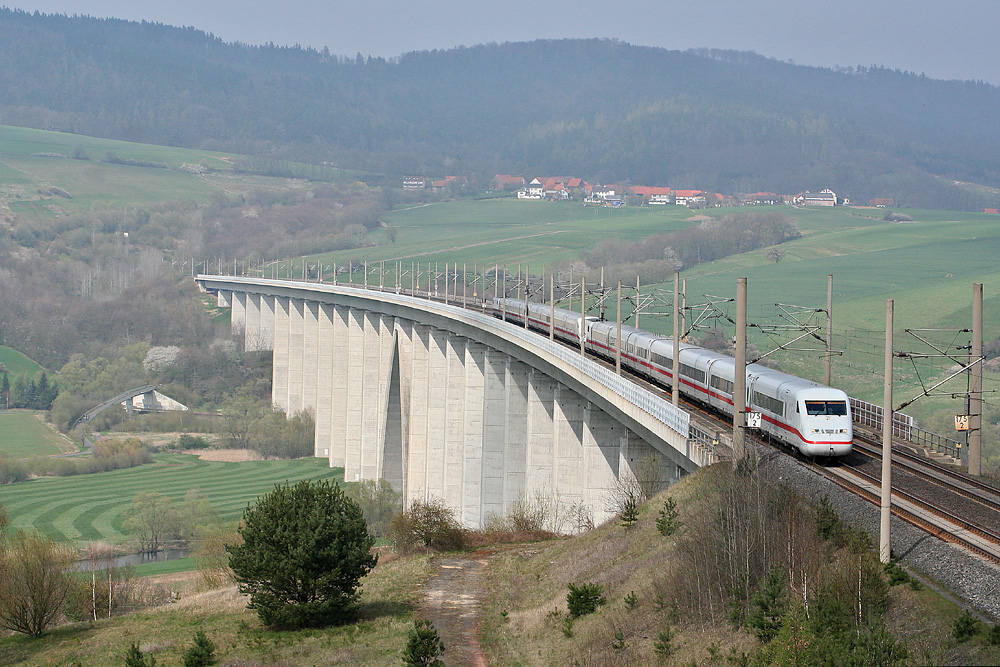
Railway bridge over the Fulda near Altmorschen

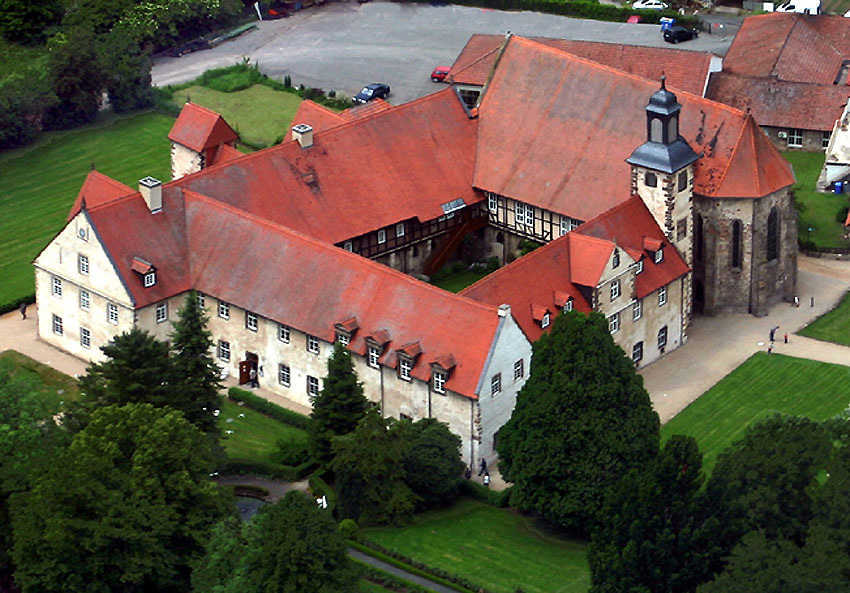
Haydau Abbey in 2005
