= Adolf Bastian =

Early German anthropologist

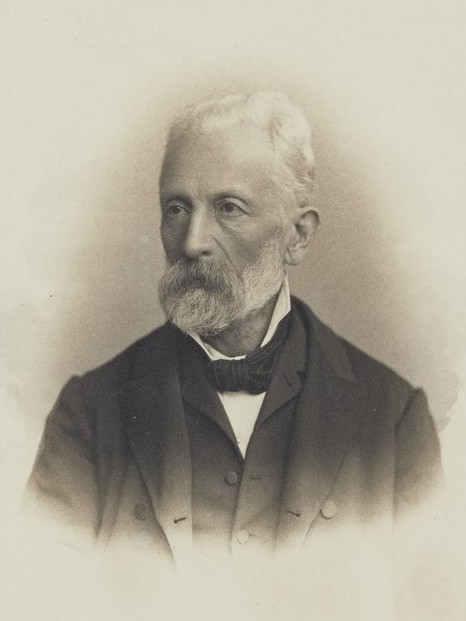
- Adolf Bastian, 1892
- Born: 26 June 1826; Bremen, German Confederation
- Died: 2 February 1905 (aged 78); Port of Spain, Trinidad and Tobago
- Scientific career
- Fields: Anthropology

Adolf Philipp Wilhelm Bastian (26 June 1826 – 2 February 1905) was a 19th-century polymath remembered best for his contributions to the development of ethnography and the development of anthropology as a discipline. His theory of the Elementargedanke resulted in Carl Jung's development of the theory of archetypes. His ideas influenced the "father of American anthropology" Franz Boas and comparative mythologist Joseph Campbell. (Note: "Jung's idea of the "archetypes" is one of the leading theories, today, in the field of our subject. It is a development of the earlier theory of Adolf Bastian...")

== Life ==
Bastian was born in Bremen, at the time a state of the German Confederation, into a prosperous bourgeois German family of merchants. His career at university was broad almost to the extent of being eccentric. He studied law at the Ruprecht Karl University of Heidelberg, and biology at what is now Humboldt University of Berlin, the Friedrich Schiller University of Jena, and the University of Würzburg. It was at this last university that he attended lectures by Rudolf Virchow and developed an interest in what was then known as 'ethnology'. He finally settled on medicine and earned a degree from Prague in 1850.

Bastian became a ship's doctor and began an eight-year voyage that took him around the world. This was the first of what would be a quarter of a century of travels. He returned to Germany in 1859 and wrote a popular account of his travels along with an ambitious three-volume work entitled Man In History, which became one of his most well-known works.

In 1861 he began a four-year journey to Southeast Asia and his account of this journey, The People Of East Asia occupied six volumes. When Bastian finally published his studies and observations as Journey through Cambodia to Cochinchina in Germany in 1868 - told in detail but uninspiredly, above all without a single one of his drawings - this work did not became influential, though at about the same great popularity was accrued by Henri Mouhot's posthumous work with vivid descriptions of Angkor, Travels in the Central Parts of Indo-China, Siam, Cambodia and Laos, published in 1864 through the Royal Geographical Society.

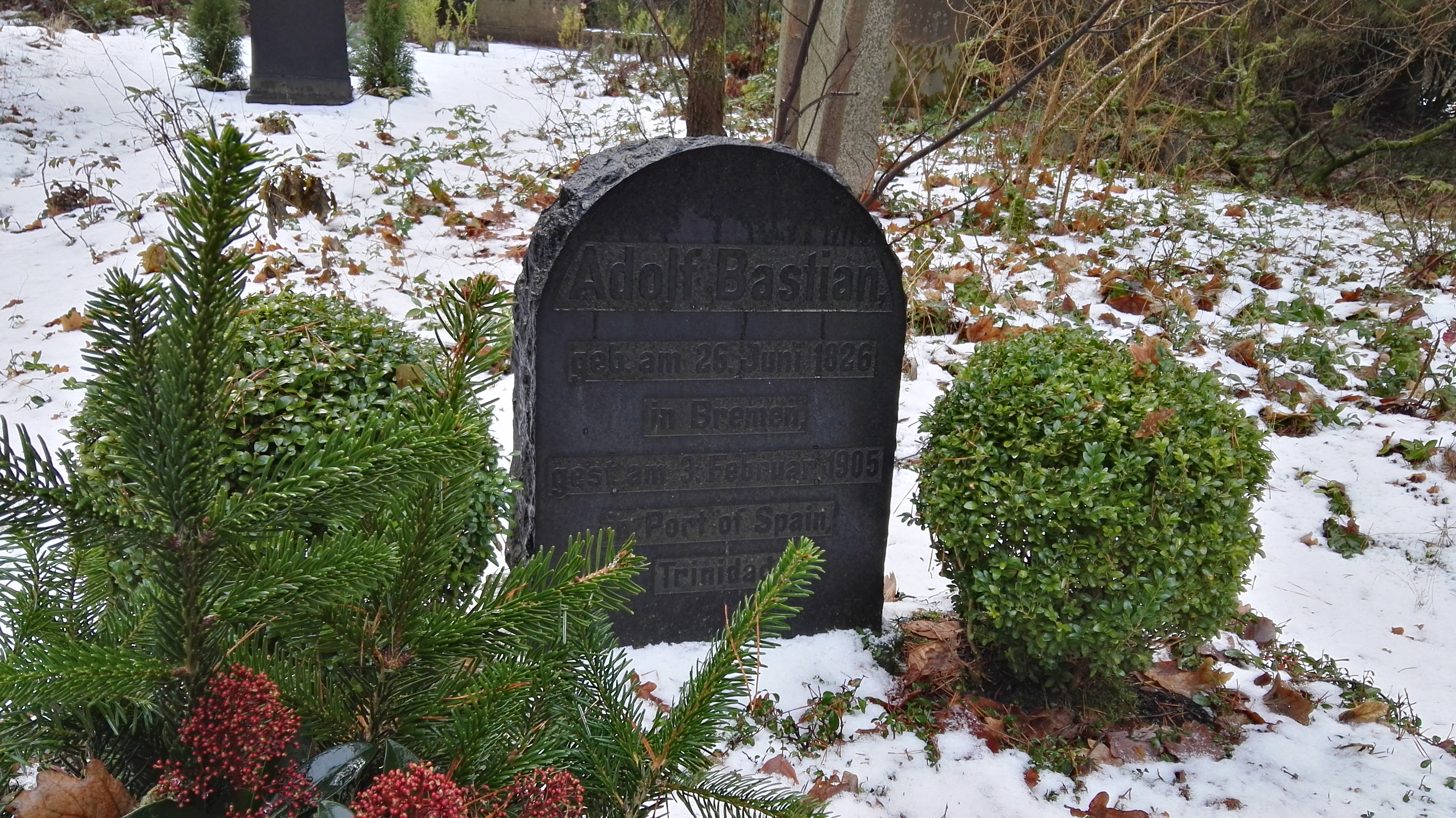
Bastian's gravestone in Berlin.

He relocated to Berlin in 1866, where he became a member of the Academy of Sciences Leopoldina in 1869. Together with Robert Hartmann (1832–1893), Bastian initiated the ethnological and anthropological journal, Zeitschrift für Ethnologie (ZfE) in 1869. He also worked with Rudolf Virchow to organize the Berlin Society for Anthropology, Ethnology, and Prehistory, which would use the ZfE as its main publication outlet.

In 1873, he was one of the founders and first director of the Ethnological Museum of Berlin, and served as its first director. Its collection of ethnographic artifacts became one of the largest in the world for decades to come. Among others who worked for him at the museum were the young Franz Boas, who later founded the American school of ethnology, and Felix von Luschan. As head of the Africa Department, Bastian devised collection instructions typical of the colonial era.

During the 1870s Bastian left Berlin and again traveled extensively in Africa writing accounts about Angola, Congo, Mozambique as well as the New World. He was elected as a member to the American Philosophical Society in 1886.

He died in Port of Spain, Trinidad and Tobago during one of these journeys in 1905.

== Works ==
- Travels in Burma in the Years 1861–1862
- Travels in Siam in the Year 1863
- Travels in China...
- Die deutsche Expedition an der Loango-Küste (1874)

Bastian is remembered as one of the pioneers of the concept of the 'psychic unity of mankind' – the idea that all humans share a basic mental framework. This became the basis of 20th century structuralism, and influenced Carl Jung's idea of the collective unconscious. He also argued that the world was divided into different 'geographical provinces' and that each of these provinces had the same stages of evolutionary development. According to Bastian, innovations and culture traits tended not to diffuse across areas. Rather, each province took its unique form as a result of its environment. This philosophy was part of a larger nineteenth century interest in the 'comparative method' as practiced by anthropologists such as Edward B. Tylor.

While Bastian considered himself to be extremely scientific, it is worth noting that he shared the naturalist tradition that was inspired by Johann Gottfried Herder and exemplified by people such as Alexander von Humboldt. For him, empiricism meant a rejection of philosophy in favor of scrupulous observations. As a result, he remained hostile to Darwin's theory of evolution (and its main German advocate, Ernst Haeckel), because the physical transformation of species had never been observed empirically, despite the fact that he posited a similar evolutionary development for human civilization. Additionally, he was much more concerned with documenting unusual civilizations before they vanished than with the rigorous application of scientific observation. As a result, some have criticized his works for being disorganized collections of facts rather than coherently structured or carefully researched empirical studies.

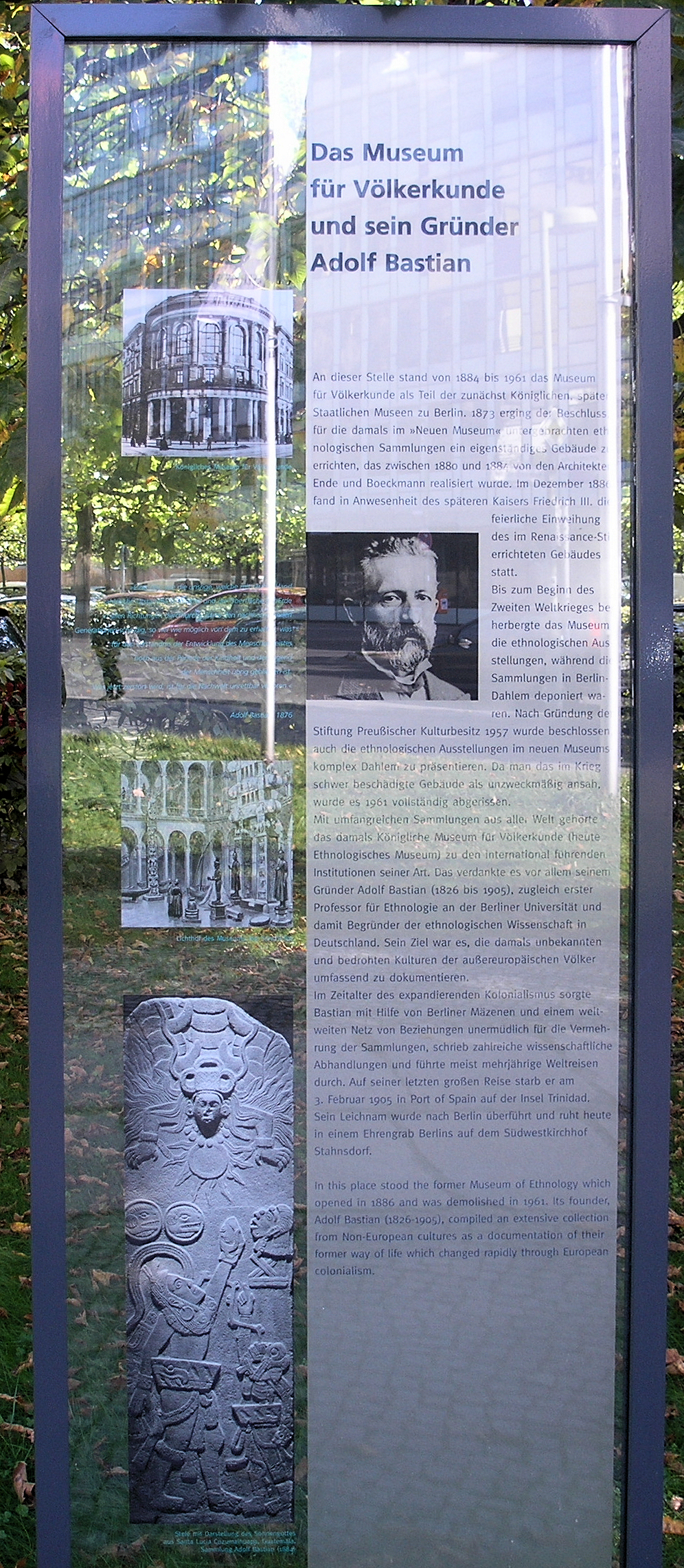
Memorial plaque, Adolf Bastian, Stresemannstraße 110, Berlin-Kreuzberg, Germany

In arguing for a "psychic unity of mankind," Bastian proposed a straightforward project for the long-term development of a science of human culture and consciousness. He argued that the mental acts of all people everywhere on the planet are the products of physiological mechanisms characteristic of the human species. Every human mind inherits a complement of species-specific "elementary ideas" (Elementargedanken), and hence the minds of all people, regardless of their race or culture, operate in the same way.

According to Bastian, the contingencies of geographic location and historical background create different local elaborations of the "elementary ideas"; these he termed "folk ideas" (Völkergedanken). Bastian also proposed a "genetic principle" by which societies develop during the course of their history from exhibiting simple sociocultural institutions to becoming increasingly complex in their organization. Through the accumulation of ethnographic data, we can study the psychological principles of mental development as they reveal themselves in diverse regions and subject to differing conditions. Although one is speaking with individual informants, Bastian claimed that the object of research is not the study of the individual per se, but rather the "folk ideas" or "collective mind" of a particular people.

The more one studies various peoples, Bastian thought, the more one observes that the historically conditioned "folk ideas" are of secondary importance compared with the universal "elementary ideas". The individual is like the cell in an organism, a social animal whose mind – its "folk ideas" – is influenced by its social background; and the "elementary ideas" are the ground from which these “folk ideas” develop. From this perspective, the social group has a kind of group mind, a "societal soul" (Gesellschaftsseele), in which the individual mind is embedded. These ideas of Bastian's prefigured (and influenced) the later study of psychological archetypes, comparative mythology, cultural universals and cross-cultural psychology.

Bastian believed that the "elementary ideas" are to be reconstructed scientifically from "folk ideas" as varying forms of collective representations (Gesellschaftsgedanken). Because one cannot observe the collective representations per se, Bastian claimed that the ethnographic project had to proceed through a series of five analytical steps (see Koepping, 1983):

1. Fieldwork: Empirical description of cross-cultural data (as opposed to armchair philosophy; Bastian himself spent much of his adult life among non-European peoples).
2. Deduction of collective representations: From cross-cultural data we describe the collective representations in a given society.
3. Analysis of folk ideas: Collective representations are divided into constituent folk ideas. Geographical regions often exhibit similar patterns of folk ideas – he termed these “idea circles” which described the collective representations of particular regions.
4. Deduction of elementary ideas: Resemblances between folk ideas and patterns of folk ideas across regions indicate underlying elementary ideas.
5. Application of a scientific psychology: Study of elementary ideas defines the psychic unity of mankind, which is due to the underlying psychophysiological structure of the species – this study is to be accomplished by a truly scientific, cross-culturally grounded psychology.
