= Museum of Municipal Collections in the Zeughaus =

Museum in Wittenberg, Germany

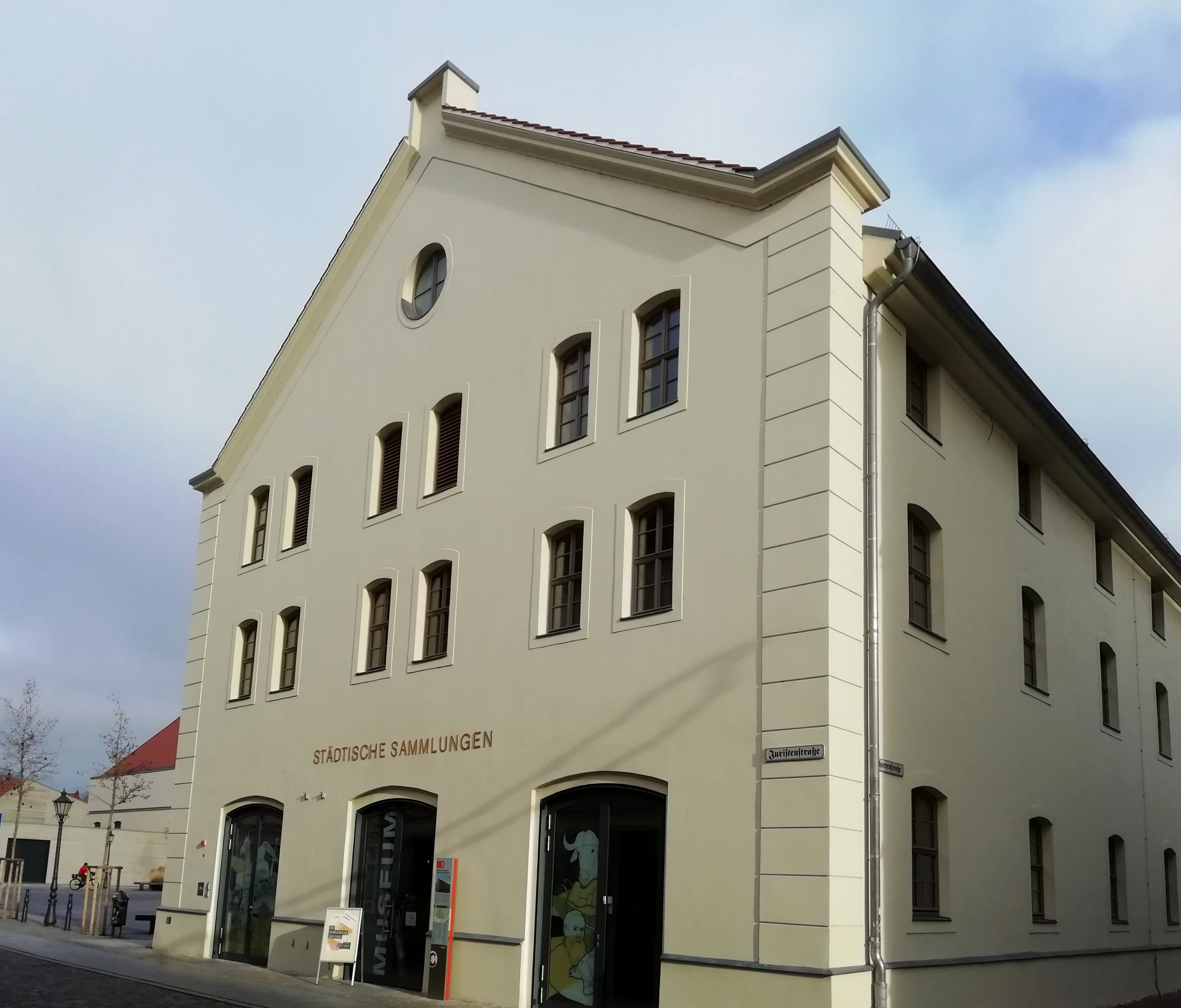
Wittenberg - Museum im Zeughaus (2018)

The Museum of Municipal Collections in the Zeughaus (german: Museum der städtischen Sammlungen im Zeughaus) is an interdisciplinary exhibition building in Wittenberg that presents objects from archaeology and urban history, as well as natural history and ethnology. The director of the museum is Andreas Wurda.

== The armoury ==
The former armoury („Zeughaus“) at Juristenstraße 16a, located on Arsenalplatz, is a listed building in the old town of Wittenberg. The registration number as a Wittenberg monument is 094 35933. The house was built in 1855 as a coach house (artillery carriage house) and has served both military and civilian purposes since then. In 2016/17, a general renovation was carried out and the historic façade facing Arsenalplatz was restored.

== Exhibition ==
From 2015 to 2018, modern exhibition rooms with a combined area of more than 1500 square metres were created in several stages on three floors in the historic armoury. On 21 December 2018, the museum was opened with lectures by Reiner Haseloff, Torsten Zugehör and Nils Seethaler.

=== City's "crown jewels" ===
In March 2015, the ground floor was opened first: Eighteen "crown jewels" of the city are exhibited there on three hundred square metres, including three objects from the collection of Julius Riemer. Exhibits on the city's history include, for example, a "giant rib" from the relic collection of Frederick the Wise and the Lord Mayor's chain of office. At the centre of the exhibition is a model of the city around 1870, which covers almost 20 square metres of floor space. This part of the permanent exhibition serves as an introduction and reference to the permanent exhibitions on the floors above in the same building.

=== City history ===
On the first floor of the armoury, 406 exhibits on the history of the town of Wittenberg are displayed on more than 500 square metres. The exhibition "Wittenberg through the Centuries" covers prehistory on the territory of the present town, the Middle Ages and the early modern period as well as the 19th and 20th centuries. Finally, possible developments in the future of the city are reflected upon. The exhibition thematically complements the Historical City Information in the Stadthaus and continues this exhibition chronologically to the present.

=== Natural history and ethnology collection of Julius Riemer ===
On the upper floor there is a permanent exhibition with objects from the Riemer collection. The Riemer's World exhibition presents 1500 objects on natural history and ethnology on more than 500 square metres of exhibition space and places the biography of the collector Julius Riemer at the centre of the presentation. Over several years of preparation, this exhibition of the Wittenberg Municipal Collections was again developed in cooperation with the Friends of the Julius Riemer Collection

== Literature ==
- Karina Blüthgen: Finissage im Zeughaus: Seit es Menschen gibt, Dinge werden verehrt. In: Mitteldeutsche Zeitung of 22 April 2018.
- Ronny Kabus: Jews of Lutherstadt Wittenberg in the Third Reich. 2015.
