= Raiko Krauss =

German archaeologist (born 1973)

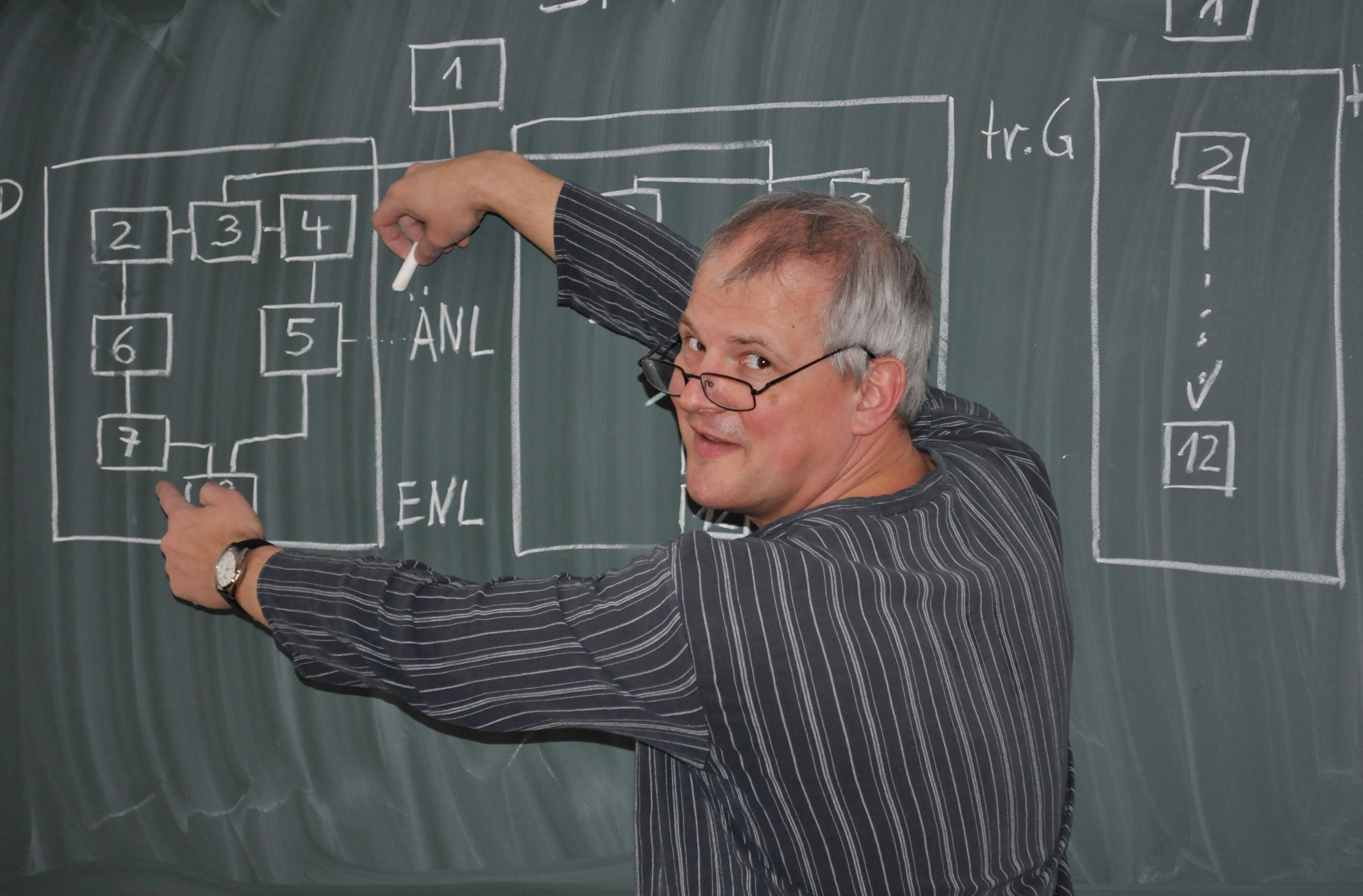
- Krauss teaching at the University of Tübingen
- Born: 1973 (age 52–53); Friedrichshain, Berlin, Germany
- Occupation: Archaeologist
- Spouse: Anna-Sophia Brickwell
- Children: 4
- Scientific career
- Fields: Archaeology

Raiko Krauss (German spelling Krauß), born 1973 in Friedrichshain, Berlin is a German archaeologist of prehistory.

== Biography ==
In 1992, Krauss submitted his Abitur at the Georg-Friedrich-Handel-Gymnasium in Friedrichshain, Berlin. Between 1988 and 1990, as a high school student, he already completed summer internships between at the Berlin Antiquities Collection, and participated in excavations conducted by the Potsdam Museum of Prehistory.

In the summer semester of 1994, after national service in the emergency ward of a Berlin hospital, he began his studies in Prehistory and Classical Archaeology at the Humboldt University, Berlin, where he also attended classes in Classical Philology, Ancient History, and Philosophy, as well as lectures at the Free University of Berlin on Comparative Indo-Germanic Linguistics. Between 1999 and 2000, he was appointed as a student research assistant at the Hermann von Helmholtz Centre for Cultural Technology in order to curate the teaching collection of the Chair for Prehistory, and participated in various excavation projects within Germany, Bulgaria, Greece, Italy, Romania, and Turkey. In 2000, he completed his studies at the Humboldt University with a Magister dissertation on the Chalcolithic settlement of Dyakovo in the Struma river valley, Bulgaria.

In 2004, he completed his doctorate at the Free University of Berlin under the supervision of Bernhard Hänsel and Hermann Parzinger with the dissertation topic "Prehistoric Settlement in the Lower Course of the Yantra". Between 2002 and 2004, he was a recipient of a doctoral dissertation stipend from the German Academic Scholarship Foundation. Following this, he briefly worked in 2004 at the State Office for Archaeology, Saxony. On account of his dissertation, he was awarded the Travel Grant of the German Archaeological Institute, and spent a year touring the Mediterranean and Black Sea regions.

From 2005 to 2008, he was a research associate at the Eurasia Department of the German Archaeological Institute, and between 2007 and 2008 also an adjunct at the Institute for Prehistoric Archaeology at the Free University of Berlin. Since the 2008/09 winter semester, he has researched and taught at the Institute for Prehistory and Medieval Archaeology of the University of Tübingen. In 2014, he successfully received his habilitation with a work entitled "The Dynamic of Neolithisation in Southeast Europe. The Advent of Farming, Husbandry, and sedentary Living", and received venia legendi (permission for lecturing) in the discipline of Prehistory. From 2017 to 2022, Krauss has been a recipient of the Heisenberg Stipend of the German Research Foundation and since November 2018 he is professor for central and southeast European Prehistory in Tübingen.

The epochs ranging from the Mesolithic to the Bronze Age in Middle and Southeast Europe form the centre of his archaeological activities, with important research projects focusing upon the Early Neolithic settlements of Ovčarovo-Gorata, Bulgaria, the Chalcolithic to Early Bronze Age site of Foeni-Gaz, Romania, and the Chalcolithic burial ground of Varna, Bulgaria. He was able to demonstrate that a portion of the allegedly Early Neolithic figure ensemble discovered at Belica, Serbia, were in fact of recent manufacture, thereby partially confirming a charge of forgery brought by Serbian colleagues. He has directed excavations at the multiphase prehistoric settlement of Bucova Pusta IV, Romania, in cooperation with the Banat Museum in Timišoara since 2010, and, with the State Office for the Conservation of Antiquities, various excavations of Mesolithic-Early Neolithic sites in Baden-Württemberg. Other focuses of his teaching and research activities include Archaeomusicology, and Megaliths in North Africa He is chairmen of the Berlin Society for Anthropology, Ethnology, and Prehistory, vice president of the German-Bulgarian-Society and corresponding member of the German Archaeological Institute. In 2015 he received the Badge of Honour of the community of Dudeștii Vechi, Romania.

He lives and works in Tübingen and Berlin. He is married to the singer and vocal pedagogue Anna-Sophia Brickwell and has four children.

== Publications ==
Stone Age without Stones. The Early Neolithic site of Bucova Pusta IV in northwestern Banat (Romania)

Dynamics of Neolithisation in South-eastern Europe. The Beginnings of Agriculture, Husbendry and Sedentary Life. Mitteilungen der Prähistorischen Kommission 93 (Wien 2023) ISBN 978-3-7001-8879-7

Ovčarovo-Gorata. Eine frühneolithische Siedlung in Nordostbulgarien. Archäologie in Eurasien 29, Habelt, Bonn 2014, ISBN 978-3-7749-3914-1

Die prähistorische Besiedlung am Unterlauf der Jantra vor dem Hintergrund der Kulturgeschichte Nordbulgariens. Prähistorische Archäologie in Südosteuropa 20, Verlag Marie Leidorf, Rahden 2006, ISBN 3-89646-591-0

Prehistoric Mining and Metallurgy at the Southeast Bulgarian Black Sea Coast

Edited with Harald Floss: Southeast Europe before Neolithisation. Proceedings of the International Workshop within the Collaborative Research Centres SFB 1070 "RessourcenKulturen", Schloss Hohentübingen, 9 May 2014, Tübingen University Press 2016, ISBN 978-3-946552-01-7

LBK & Vinča – Formation and Transformation of Early Neolithic Lifestyles in Europe in the second half of the 6th millennium BC

Edited with Martin Bartelheim, Barbara Horejs: Von Baden bis Troia. Ressourcennutzung, Metallurgie und Wissenstransfer. Eine Jubiläumsschrift für Ernst Pernicka Verlag Marie Leidorf, Rahden 2016, ISBN 978-3-86757-010-7.

Edited: Beginnings – New Research in the Appearance of the Neolithic between Northwest Anatolia and the Carpathian Basin. Menschen – Kulturen – Traditionen. Studien aus den Forschungsclustern des Deutschen Archäologischen Instituts 1, Verlag Marie Leidorf, Rahden 2011, ISBN 978-3-86757-381-8.
