= Georg Pfeffer =

German anthropologist (1943–2020)

- Born: January 17, 1943; Berlin, Germany
- Died: May 20, 2020 (aged 77)
- Citizenship: Germany
- Occupation: Anthropologist
- Parents: Margaret Wainman Kirby (mother); Karl Heinz Pfeffer (father)

Academic background
- Education: Doctor of Philosophy
- Alma mater: University of Freiburg (Ph.D.)
- Thesis: Pariagruppen des Pandschab (Ph.D.) (1970)

Academic work
- Discipline: Anthropology
- Sub-discipline: Ethnography; Ethnology
- Institutions: Former professor, Institute of Social and Cultural Anthropology of Free University of Berlin
- Main interests: Power relations Anthropology of kinship Anthropology of religion

Georg Pfeffer (17 January 1943 — 20 May 2020) was a German anthropologist. Born in 1943 in Berlin to a German sociologist father and a British mother, he was schooled in Hamburg. In 1959, he moved to Lahore with his family, and studied at the city's Forman Christian College for 3 years. Later, he moved back to Germany and studied at the University of Freiburg where he also completed his Ph.D.

He served for 1 year as lecturer and for nearly 6 years as a professor of ethnology at the Heidelberg University. Later, he joined the Free University of Berlin and served as a professor at its Institute of Ethnology for nearly 23 years until his retirement in 2008. He had done fieldwork among the Adivasis of India's central regions, and in the eastern state Odisha. He also did field research in Pakistan. He was a co-founder of the European Association of Social Anthropologists and had worked at various editorial positions in a few anthropological journals. He died at the age of 77 years after a grave illness.

== Early life and family ==
Georg Pfeffer was born on 17 January 1943 at Berlin in Germany to Karl Heinz Pfeffer and Margaret Wainman Kirby. His father was a sociologist. His mother was a Briton. He had to leave his native place because of bombing during the second world war's end. During his early childhood years, he lived in village in Hesse where he came in touch with refugees and experienced the "social structures" of Germany's countryside areas. In 1949, the Pfeffer family shifted to Hamburg where he completed his schooling.

== Education ==
When Georg Pfeffer was 16 years old, the Pfeffer family shifted to Lahore in Pakistan. From 1959 to 1962, he studied at the Forman Christian College. During that time, he also learned about the culture, society, and language of Pakistan. Later, he returned to Germany. In 1966, he started to study history of religion, sociology, and ethnology at the University of Freiburg. His teachers at the university included Rolf Herzog and Heinrich Popitz. In 1970, he completed his Ph.D. at the university. For his doctorate, he presented a monographic dissertation titled Pariagruppen des Pandschab (Pariah Groups of Punjab).

== Academic career and research ==
The subjects of Pfeffer's research included the study of power relations, anthropology of kinship, and anthropology of religion. He carried out field studies in India and Pakistan since 1968. He had studied the indigenous social groups and caste system of India and Pakistan. In the later half of the 1960s, he did his first ethnographic field study, and the subjects of the study were Lahore's "untouchable sweepers".

In 1971, he joined the South Asia Institute of Heidelberg University as an assistant. In the 1970s, he also performed his career's second field study on the role of the Vedic Brahmins in Jagannath Temple at Puri in Odisha, India. In Odisha (Note: Odisha was known as Orissa before 2011.), he had done fieldwork solely at the beginning. Later, he conducted research there with a group of scholars from India and Germany. He had been among the people of Odisha nearly each year for a few decades.

At the Heidelberg University, he also presented a monographic thesis titled Puris Sasana–Dörfer, Basis einer Regionalen Elite (Puris Sasana Villages, Basis of Regional Elite) for his habilitation in 1976, and worked as a lecturer at the university in 1978. From 1979 to 1985, he worked as a professor of ethnology at the Heidelberg University. From 1985 to his retirement in 2008, he worked as a professor at the Free University of Berlin's Institute of Social and Cultural Anthropology (Note: The Institute of Social and Cultural Anthropology was known as the Institute of Ethnology till 2015.) and also supervised the Asian studies at the institute. Since the 1980s, central India's Adivasi people had been the main focus of his field research, specially the study of their kinship, rituals, and religion. From 1984 to 1988, he was the co-editor of the South Asian Social Scientist (Note: A journal published by the University of Madras's Department of Anthropology.). In 1989, he co-founded the European Association of Social Anthropologists.

Since 1990, he was a member of the editorial staff of the Zeitschrift für Ethnologie for its South Asia and Symbolic Classification subject. From 1993 to 1995, he along with Bernhard Hänsel, served as the co-editor for the publications of the Berliner Gesellschaft für Anthropologie, Ethnologie und Urgeschichte. Between 1996 and 2006, he headed the Deutsche Forschungsgemeinschaft-funded Schwerpunktprogramm Orissa (Note: Priority Programme Orissa) at the Institute of Ethnology of the Free University of Berlin under which a number of long-term research projects were executed in the state. He was also an associate fellow of the University of Groningen's Centre for the Study of Religion and Culture in Asia for its 2 research projects — Religion, Culture and Society of Indian "Tribal" and Communities and History and Theory of the Anthropology of India.

Peter Berger noted that Pfeffer compared "worldviews and social structures" of the American, Australian and Central Indian autochthonous peoples. According to Berger, Pfeffer's "most important contribution lies in his comparative endeavor, as he worked out the general patterns of social structure and ideology that are shared by the various Central Indian indigenous peoples and at the same time constitute different distinctive cultural sub-complexes."

From 1993 to 1995 Pfeffer was the President of the Berlin Society for Anthropology, Ethnology and Prehistory.

== Other interests ==
Pfeffer was also interested in literature, art, music, sports, and the current political events.

== Death ==
Pfeffer died on 20 May 2020 at the age of 77 because of severe illness.

== Works ==
Pfeffer wrote 4 monographs, 93 research papers, 22 reviews, 12 serials and 13 other miscellanea.

=== Books ===
Some of the books authored by Pfeffer are as follows:

- Pfeffer (2019). Lewis Henry Morgan's Comparisons Reassessing Terminology, Anarchy and Worldview in Indigenous Societies of America, Australia and Highland Middle India. New York, USA: Berghahn. ISBN 978-1789203189. LCCN 2019980482. OCLC 1105557052.
- Pfeffer, Georg (2016). Verwandtschaft als Verfassung: unbürokratische Muster öffentlicher Ordnung [Relationship as a Constitution: Unbureaucratic Models of Public Order] (illustrated ed.). Baden-Baden, Germany: Nomos. ISBN 978-3848724215. LCCN 2016418426. OCLC 944086186.
- Pfeffer, Georg (2003). Hunters, Tribes, Peasants: Cultural Crisis and Comparison. The Dr. Ambedkar Memorial Lecture Series. Bhubaneswar, India: National Institute of Social Work and Social Sciences–Centre for Development Education and Communication (NISWASS–CEDEC) Press. OCLC 918437559.
- Pfeffer, Georg (1982). Status and Affinity in Middle India. Beiträge zur Südasienforschung, Volume 76. Wiesbaden, Germany: F. Steiner. ISBN 978-3515039130. OCLC 9750736.

=== Selected papers ===
- Pfeffer, Georg (1997). "The Scheduled Tribes of Middle India as a Unit: Problems of Internal and External Comparison". In Pfeffer, Georg; Behera, Deepak Kumar (eds.). Contemporary Society: Tribal Studies. Structure and Process, Volume 1. New Delhi, India: Concept. pp. 3–27. ISBN 978-8170226413. LCCN 97905535.
- Pfeffer, Georg (2001). "A Ritual of Revival among the Gadaba of Koraput". In Kulke, Hermann; Schnepel, Burkhard (eds.). Jagannath Revisited: Studying Society, Religion, and the State in Orissa. Studies in Orissan Society, Culture, and History, Volume 1 (illustrated ed.). New Delhi, India: Manohar. pp. 123–148. ISBN 978-8173043864. LCCN 2001358932. OCLC 1129466261.
- Pfeffer, Georg (1983). "Generation and Marriage in Middle India: The Evolutionary Potential of 'Restricted Exchange'". Contributions to Indian Sociology. 17 (1). Sage Journals: 87–121. doi:10.1177/006996683017001004. S2CID 144073747.
- Pfeffer, Georg (2004). "Order in Tribal Middle Indian 'Kinship'". Anthropos. 99 (2). Nomos Verlagsgesellschaft mbH: 381–409. JSTOR 40466388.
- Pfeffer, Georg (1997). "Die Haardebatte: Gender, Glatzen und Gewalt der Bondo". Zeitschrift für Ethnologie (in German). 122 (2). Dietrich Reimer Verlag GmbH: 183–208. JSTOR 25842502.
- Pfeffer, Georg (1992). "Zur Verwandtschaftsethnologie". Zeitschrift für Ethnologie (in German). 117. Dietrich Reimer Verlag GmbH: 41–54. JSTOR 25842240.

== See also ==
- Christoph von Fürer-Haimendorf
- Paul Hockings
- Stephen Fuchs
