= Mitteldeutsche Zeitung =

German regional daily newspaper

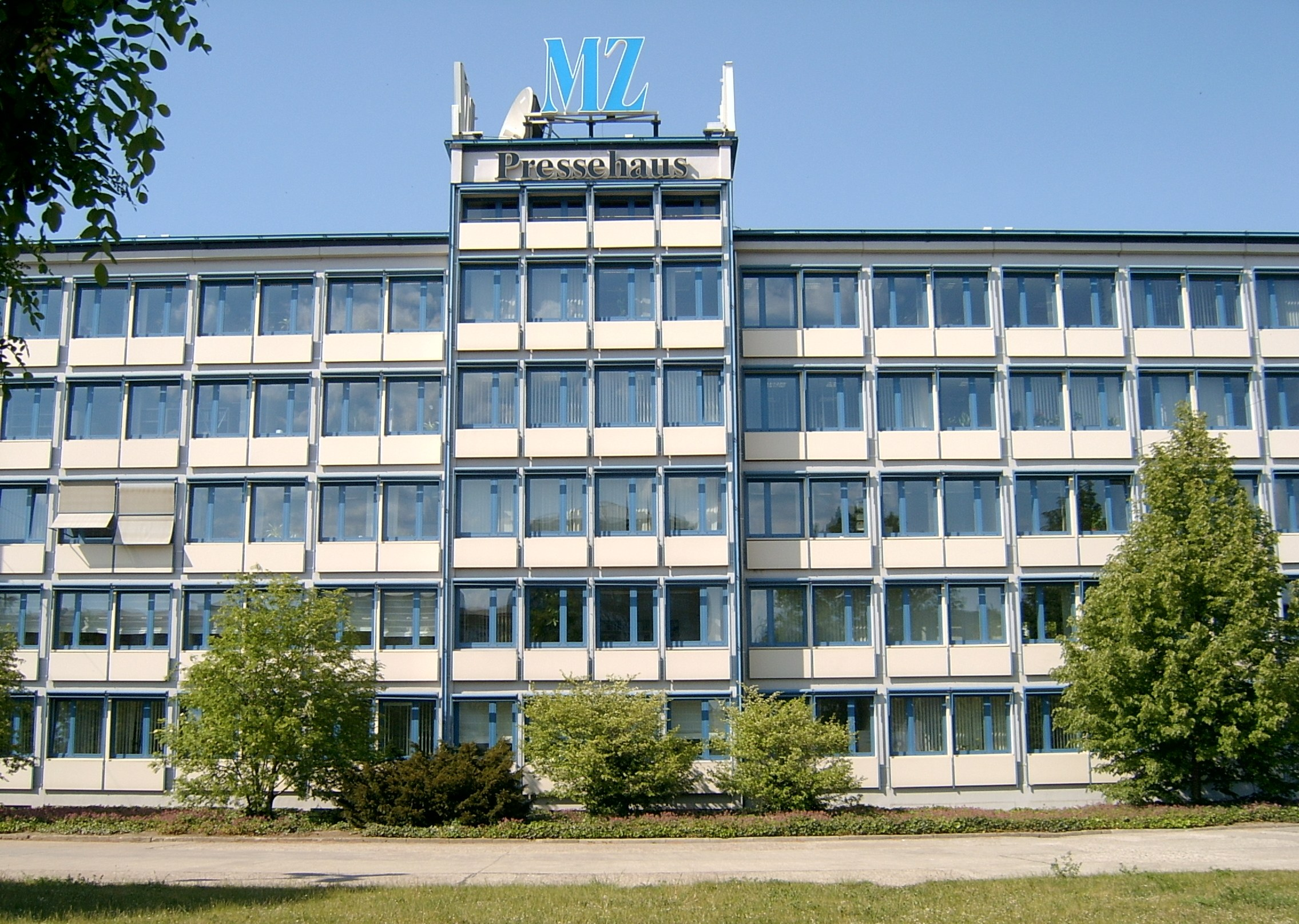
Headquarters

The Mitteldeutsche Zeitung (German pronunciation: [ˈmɪtl̩ˌdɔʏtʃə ˈtsaɪtʊŋ]; transl. "Central German Newspaper") is a regional daily newspaper for southern Saxony-Anhalt, Germany. Published in Halle with several local versions, the paper is owned by M. DuMont Schauberg, Cologne.

== History and profile ==
The MZ's forerunner, Die Freiheit (Freedom), was first published on 16 April 1946 as an organ of the ruling SED in East Germany. On 17 March 1990, the Mitteldeutsche Zeitung was first published in the year of German reunification. The newspaper's publishing company, Mitteldeutschen Druck- und Verlagshaus GmbH und Co. KG, is also divided into several subsidiary companies, including the call center MZ-Dialog and the printing/publishing house Aroprint in Bernburg.

The Mitteldeutsche Zeitung is usually the only regional newspaper available where it is sold. In its area of circulation, mainly concentrated in the southern part of Saxony-Anhalt, the MZ has no competition from other regional dailies. The Magdeburg Volksstimme is circulated according to former GDR regional borders and does not overlap with the MZ, although the Volksstimme is sometimes sold against the Altmark Zeitung in the Altmark. Ninety-six percent of all local newspapers in Saxony-Anhalt are effectively unopposed by others.

== Circulation ==
The MZ had a circulation of 456,000 copies during the third quarters of 1992. In 2001 its circulation was 332,000 copies.

The circulation of the paper was 294,694 copies in the first quarter of 2006. Its circulation during the second quarter of 2011 was 208,721 copies.

== Local editions ==
- SaaleKurier, Halle (Saale)
- AnhaltKurier, Dessau-Roßlau
- Ascherslebener Zeitung, Aschersleben
- Bernburger Kurier, Bernburg (Saale)
- Bitterfelder Zeitung, Bitterfeld-Wolfen
- ElbeKurier, Wittenberg
- Jessener Land, Jessen (Elster)
- Köthener Zeitung, Köthen
- Neuer Landbote, Merseburg
- Mansfelder Zeitung, Eisleben
- Quedlinburger Harz Bote, Quedlinburg
- Sangerhäuser Zeitung, Sangerhausen
- Weißenfelser Zeitung, Weißenfels
- Zeitzer Zeitung, Zeitz
- Naumburger Tageblatt, Naumburg
