= Robert Hartmann (naturalist) =

German naturalist, anatomist and ethnographer

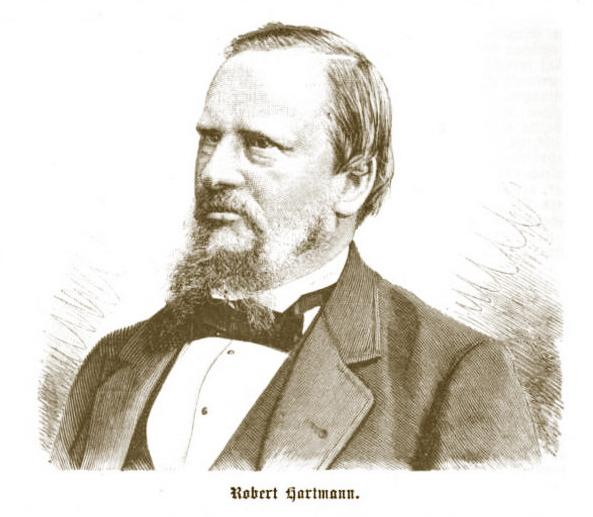
Robert Hartmann

Karl Eduard Robert Hartmann (8 October 1832 – 1893) was a German naturalist, anatomist and ethnographer.

== Career ==
A native of Blankenburg am Harz, Hartmann studied medicine and sciences in Berlin, and in 1865 was an instructor of comparative zoology and physiology at the agricultural academy in Proskau. In 1873 he became a professor of anatomy at the University of Berlin. During his career, he performed ethnographical and geographical research in Africa, and conducted studies on the anatomy of marine species while working in Sweden and Italy.

In 1859-60 he accompanied Adalbert von Barnim (1841-1860), the son of Adalbert of Prussia (1811-1873), on a mission to northeastern Africa (Egypt, Sudan and Nubia). Here he performed ethnographical, zoological and geographical studies in the region. On the journey, Adalbert von Barnim became ill and died on 12 June 1860 at Roseires in the Sudan. Hartmann wrote about his experiences regarding the expedition in a book titled Reise des Freiherrn von Barnim durch nord-ost-Afrika in den Jahren 1859 und 1860 (1863).

In 1869, with Adolf Bastian (1826-1905), he founded the Zeitschrift für Ethnologie (Journal of Ethnology). He served as secretary of the Berliner Gesellschaft für Anthropologie, Ethnologie und Urgeschichte (Berlin Society for Anthropology, Ethnology and Prehistory) and was general secretary of the Anthropologischen Gesellschaft (Anthropological Society). He penned a number of articles on Africa, as well as a book on anthropoid apes, a treatise in which he describes the behaviour of non-human apes and suggests that humans and non-human apes have an evolutionary common ancestor.

== Selected publications ==
- Naturgeschichtlich-medizinische skizze der Nilländer (Berlin 1865-66)
- Die Nigritier (Berlin. 1876, Bd. 1)
- Die Völker Afrikas (Leipzig 1880); (The peoples of Africa) (1880)
- Handbuch der Anatomie des Menschen (Handbook of human anatomy) (1881)
- Der Gorilla (Leipzig 1881)
- Die menschenähnlichen Affen (Anthropoid apes) (Leipzig 1883)
- Abessinien und die Nilländer (Abyssinia and The Nile Valley) (1883)
- Madagaskar und die Inseln Seychellen, Aldabra, Komoren und Maskarenen (Madagascar and the Islands of the Seychelles, Aldabra, Comoros and Mascarenes) (Leipzig 1886).
