= List of figures in Germanic heroic legend, A =

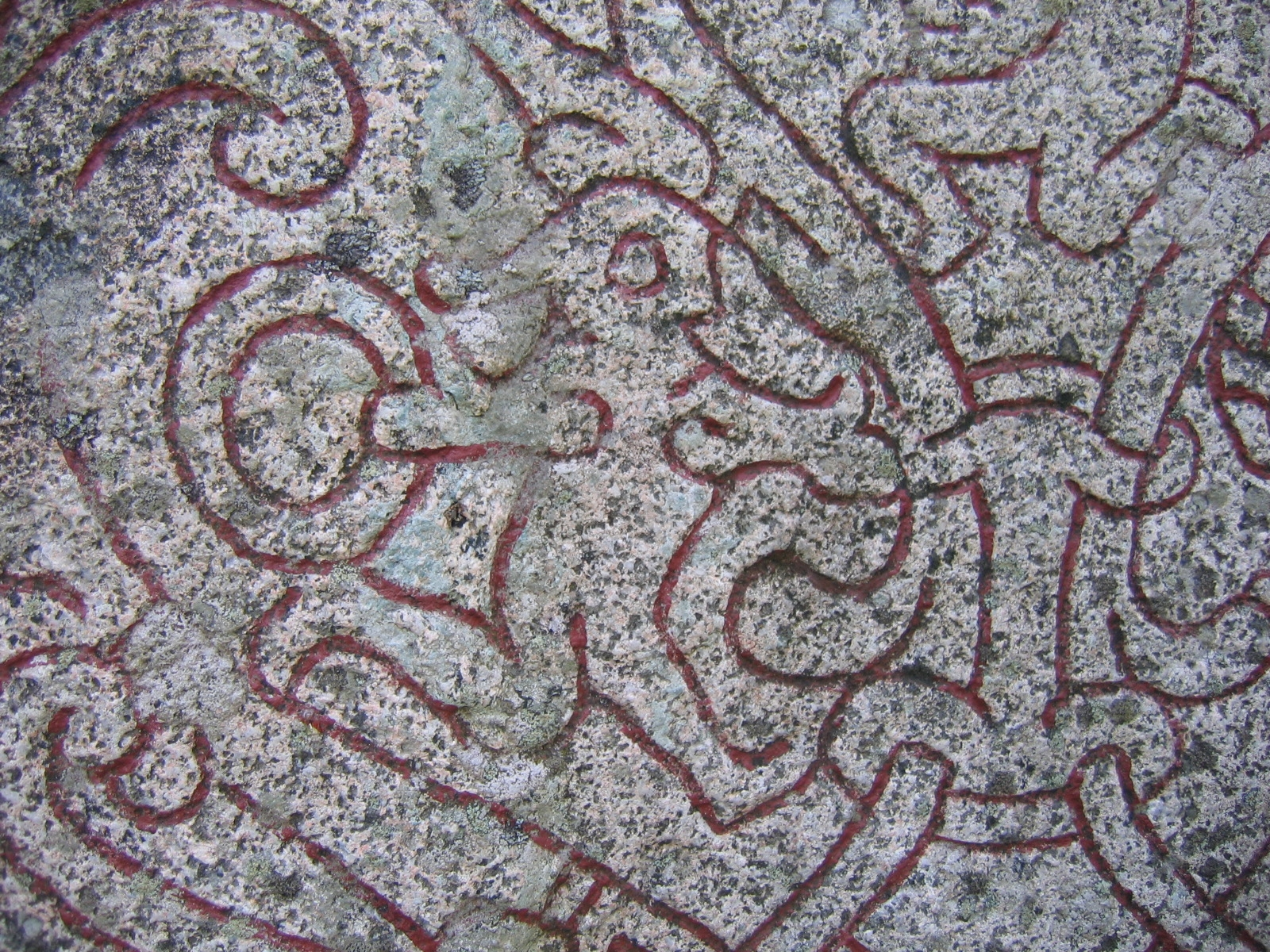
This part of the Drävle Runestone is held to depict Andvari.

Figure	Names in medieval languages	Historical origin	Name meaning	Relationships	Early and English Attestations	Norse Attestations	German Attestations
Adaocarus				See Erpr^{2}			
Aðils				See Eadgils			
Agilmund	Old English: Ægelmund, Latin: Agilmund, Agelmund, Agilimundus	Attested as Agilimundus by Ammianus Marcellinus.	In her analysis of the Proto-Norse form *Agilamunduz, Peterson analyses the first element as *ag- ("point, edge", or "worry, fear") expanded with a dimininutive -l- suffix, and the second element as *munduz ("protector").	The Historia Langobardorum tells that he was elected king after Aio, and he ruled for 33 years. During his reign, a prostitute gave birth to a litter of seven boys who were thrown into a fish pond in order to drown them. Agilmund, who was passing on his horse, poked the drowning litter with his spear and pulled up a boy that was holding onto the spear. He named him "fish pond man", Lamissio, and the boy became a prominent warrior. One day Agilmund and his troops wanted to cross a river but were stopped by shield-maidens. To settle the dispute Lamissio fought against a shield-maiden while swimming in the river, and Lamissio killed his opponent so the Lombards could pass and settle in the land on the other side of the river. After a long period of peace, Agilmund was killed by the Vulgars who carried away his daughter.	Origo Gentis Langobardorum, Historia Langobardorum, Widsith		
Agio	Latin: Agio, Aio, Aggo		The name means "sword", from PGmc *Aʒjō ("sword", "edge").	The Historia Langobardorum tells that Aio and his brother Ibor were the sons of the wise woman Gambara. The two brothers led their people, the Winnili from Scandinavia to Scoringa, where they settled, but the Vandals, led by Ambri and Assi, demanded that the Winili pay tribute to them or face war. Consulting their mother Gambara, they opted for war instead, and sent a messenger to the Vandals that they would rather fight than be slaves. The Winnili settlers were few in number, but young and healthy. Gambara addressed the goddess Frigg (Frēa), and she told her that the Winnili women should but their hair in front of their faces like beards, and stand next to their men. When the god Odin (Godan) saw them in the morning he asked who the "long beards" were, and Frigg prevailed on Odin to give the Winnili victory against the Vandals. When Aio and Ibor were dead, they were succeeded by Aio's son Agilmund.	Origo Gentis Langobardorum, Historia Langobardorum, Prosper of Aquitaine	Gesta Danorum	
Agnar^{1}	Old Norse: Agnarr, Latin: Agnarus	In Scandinavian tradition, Agnar was attributed roles previously held by his father Ingeld.	From PN *Aʒinaharjaʀ ("having an army of fear"), where *aʒina- means "fear" and *harjaʀ means "host".	In Gesta Danorum, Agnar, son of Ingeld, is to marry Hrút, Hrólfr Kraki's sister, but there is a quarrel and Bödvar Bjarki kills Agnar in a duel and he dies with a smile. In Bjarkamál, during Hrólfr Kraki's and his champions' last fight, Bödvar Bjarki recalls how he defeated Agnarr the son of Ingeld, and he had never seen a bolder man, and he died laughing. It was killing Agnarr that gave Bjarki the name Bǫðvar, and it seems to have been the main event in his life.		Gesta Danorum, Skjöldunga saga, Bjarkamál, Bjarkarímur, Hrólfs saga kraka	
Agnar^{2}	Old Norse: Agnarr	Based on Agnar^{1}	See Agnar^{1}	In Hrólfs saga kraka, the son of Hroar (Hrothgar). He becomes a famous warrior. He was the son of Ogn (in the place of Wealhtheow) and probably so to introduce him without mentioning his father Ingeld (who is mentioned in other accounts). He dives and retrieves the famous Scylding ring, and after that he and his mother disappear from the saga, as commented by Damico. However, later in the saga, the dying Bödvar Bjarki boasts "I killed Agnarr, berserk and no less a king", and Shippey comments that there seems to be two Agnarr, and asks whether Bödvar is bragging about killing his lord's cousin.		Hrólfs saga kraka	
Agnar^{3}	Old Norse: Agnarr	Possibly historical.	See Agnar^{1}.	According to the Ynglinga saga Agnar and Alf^{5} were the sons of king Ingvar of Fjädrundaland. As their names alliterate and are identical to some found in the Yngling dynasty, they may have been members of the royal dynasty. One Midwinter sacrifice at Uppsala, Alf^{5} made the Swedish prince Ingjald, who was the weaker boy, almost cry with frustration. When Svipdag^{3} learnt of this from Ingjald's foster-brother Gautvid, he was disgusted and roasted a wolf's heart and had Ingjald eat it. Many years later, when Ingjald was king of Sweden, he invited Agnar, Alf^{5} and their father Ingvar, together with a number of other petty kings to a feast at Uppsala. However, at night the doors were barred and he hall set on fire, burning everyone inside to death. After this Ingjald expanded his realm.		Ynglinga saga	
Agnar^{4}	Old Norse: Agnarr		See Agnar^{1}	The son of Ragnar Lodbrok and Thora and the full brother of Eric^{3}. In Ragnarssona þáttr, the two brothers came to Mälaren and sent a message to Uppsala and told Eysteinn, their father's subking, that Eric would take over and marry his daughter Borghild^{2}. When the Swedes opposed this, they met Eric and Agnar in battle after which Agnar died and Eric was taken prisoner. In Ragnars saga loðbrókar, they attack after their father had cancelled a visit to Eysteinn and the latter had ended the friendship. Agnar and Eric were not only met by the full force of the Swedish army, the king also let loose his sacred cow, Sibilja, which wreaked havoc on their army, and Agnar fell while Eric was captured.		Ragnars saga loðbrókar, Ragnarssona þáttr, Krákumál, Ad catalogum regum Sveciæ annotanda	
Agnar^{5} or Audabrodir	Old Norse: Agnarr eða Auðabróðir		See Agnar^{1}. Auðabróðir means "Auði's brother" which is what the original poem says in Sigrdrífumál.	Agnar was a king who was in a war with a king named Hjalmgunnar who was an old and able warrior. Odin had promised victory to Hjalmgunnar, but his Valkyrie Brynhild killed Hjalmgunnar instead. As punishment Odin pricked her with a sleep thorn and cursed her never to be victorious again, and that she would marry. Brynhild responded with an oath that she would never marry a man who could feel fear.		Sigrdrífumál, Helreið Brynhildar, Völsunga saga, Norna-Gests þáttr	
Agnar^{6}	Old Norse: Agnarr		See Agnar^{1}	One of Sigurd Ring's champions at the Battle of Brávellir fighting on the Swedish side. He is killed by Ubbi the Frisian fighting for the Danish Harald Wartooth.		Sögubrot	
Agne	Old Norse: Agni, Old Norse: Hǫgni	May be based on a historic 5th c. Swedish king.	The name is derived from a PGmc *aʒ- which means "point (of a spear)" or "worry, fear", and it is the same name as the German Agino. In Historia Norvegiæ, he is called Hogni, which is derived from PGmc *hag perhaps meaning "protector".	A king of Sweden of the Yngling dynasty, who according to Snorri in the Ynglinga saga pillaged in Finland (Lapland) where he killed a Finnish (Sámi) chieftain named Frosti and took his son Logi and daughter Skjalf as prisoners to Sweden. When they arrived at what is today central Stockholm, he wanted to force Skjalf to be his wife. She pretended to consent to the marriage, but during the wedding night, she avenged her father by strangling and hanging Agni in a tree, after which she went home. The beach where it happened was from that time named Agnafit. However, the Ynglingatal stanza on which Snorri's account is based, may instead be talking of Agne being sacrificed to the goddess Freyja, who was also called Skjalf, and Agni is probably, like Sveigðir, Domaldi and Jorund to be considered one of the sacrificed kings of the Yngling dynasty.		Íslendingabók, Ynglingatal, Historia Norvegiæ, Ynglinga saga, Gautreks saga	
Aio				See Agio.			
Áki^{1}	Old Norse: Áki		A name derived from PN *anuʀ ("ancestor") with a -k- suffix, or a hypocoristic form of a name with the same element. It is considered to correspond to the German name Anihho.	Áki^{1} is the champion of the Danish king Alf^{4} and takes part in a Danish attack on the Swedish king Buðli^{2}. The Swedish king is slain, and Aki^{1} kidnaps the Swedish princess Hildr^{2}, who is already married to Helgi Hildibrandsson, who is away on a war expedition. Hildr^{2} already has a son with Helgi named Hildibrand^{1} who is being raised at his Hunnish grandfather Hildibrand^{2}'s court. Aki^{1} and Hildr^{2} have the son Asmund. When Hildibrand^{1} is old enough he avenges his maternal grandfather and kills Alf^{4}, but not Aki^{1} as he is away on a raid with Asmund.		Ásmundar saga kappabanna	
Áki^{2}	Old Norse: Áki		See Áki^{1}.	A poor farmer. On the advice of his wife Grima, he kills Aslaug^{1}'s fosterfather Heimir^{2} and claims Aslaug^{1} as his own child to work his farm. When she leaves them to live with Ragnar Lodbrok, she tells them that she knows that they murdered Heimir and curses them to live having each day a worse one than the previous one until they die.		Ragnars saga loðbrókar	
Áki^{3} Aurlungatrausti				See Hache.			Þiðreks saga
Alaric	Old Norse: Alrekr, Old Norse: Alricus	May be based on a historic 5th c. Swedish king.	The first element in Alrekr is derived from PGmc *al(l)a ("all, whole"), and the second element from the adjective ríkr from PGmc rīkia- ("rich", "powerful", "prominent") but it may also partly go back to *rīk(a)z ("ruler", "prince"), cf. Gothic reiks ("ruler"). Alrekr may have been named after the first Visigothic king Alaric I, and his son Alfr (*Aþawulfaz) after the next Visigothic king Athaulf.	According to the Ynglinga saga, a Swedish king of the Yngling dynasty who succeed his father Agne, together with his brother Eric. They were skillful horsemen and competed in riding and having the best horses. One day they did not come back, but were found dead with crushed heads, and as they were unarmed, they were assumed to have killed each other with their bridles. In Gesta Danorum, Alaric is killed in battle against Ericus, an ally of Gestumblindi (Odin). In the Ynglinga saga they were succeeded by Alaric's sons Yngvi^{1} and Alf^{1}. In the Skjöldunga saga, the Danish king Frodo III married Inga, the daughter of Ingo (Yngvi^{1}) who was the son of Alricus (the 14th or 17th king of Sweden). According to Historia Norwegiæ and Íslendingabók Alrekr was instead the father of Agne (Hǫgni).		Íslendingabók (27), Ynglingatal (10), Historia Norwegiæ, Ynglinga saga (19-20), Gautrek's saga, Skjöldunga saga (VII), Gesta Danorum (V)	
Alberich	Middle High German: Alberîch, Old Norse: Alfrikr	Probably not original to the Nibelungen material; role in Ortnit probably derives from the similar role of the equivalent Old French figure Auberon in the chanson de geste Huon de Bordeaux.	"Ruler of supernatural beings [elves]", from MHG alp ("elf") and rîche ("powerful", related to Gothic reiks "ruler").	A dwarf. Protector of Siegfried's hoard and person from whom Siegfried wins his cloak of invisibility (Middle High German: tarnkappe) in the Nibelungenlied. In Ortnit, he is a ruler of an underground kingdom in Lombardy and the father of Ortnit, to whose mother he had given a magic ring; he helps Ortnit win his bride from the heathen king Machorel, and afterwards takes the magic ring back from Ortnit before warning him that he will die fighting a dragon. In the Þiðreks saga, he makes Dietrich von Bern and Witige's swords.			Nibelungenlied, Þiðreks saga, Ortnit
Alboin	Possibly Old English: Ælfwine.	King of the Lombards (died 572).	First element *alb- ("elf"), second element *wini- ("friend").	King of the Lombards. He goes as a young warrior to the Gepid king Thurisind, who spares him as a guest even though Alboin has killed his son Turismod. Alboin kills the Gepid king Cunimund and marries his daughter Rosamund, who, however, eventually kills him.	Historia Langobardorum, possibly in Widsith.		
Aldrian^{1}	Middle High German: Aldriân, Old Norse: Aldrian, Latin: Hagathio		The name Aldrian is not attested outside of heroic legend. It is often connected with Alberich, however Siegfried Gutenbrunner suggested several alternative origins: from PGmc *ald ("old"), thus earlier *Alda-rīk ("old-king"); from the common German *aldar ("age, time of life"); from the equivalent of OE aldor ("leader, ancestor"); or from *alira ("alder tree"). The suffix -ân is of Latin origin, and the whole name could be of French origin, from Audrian, Germanic *Auda-rīk ("wealth-ruler"). Hagathio is from PGmc *hag "useful, skillful", and *thiwa "servant".	The name of Hagen/Högni^{1}'s father in the Nibelungenlied, the name of Gjuki in the Þiðreks saga. In Waltharius, Hagen's father is instead named Hagathio.			Waltharius, Nibelungenlied, Þiðreks saga
Aldrian^{2}				See Hniflungr (Aldrian^{2})			
Ale the Strong	Old Norse: Áli hinn Frœkni, Latin: Alo	Probably based on the Swedish king Onela.	PN: *Anula, a diminutive form with -l- suffix of *anuz ("ancestor"), or from a name with this element, such as *Anuwinduz.	According to the Skjöldunga saga Alo was the son of king Fridleifus II of Denmark with Hilda, the kidnapped daughter of king Alo of Oppland in Norway. As he was a bastard son, his half-brother Frodo inherited the throne. Alo instead took over the Swedish throne. Frodo, who feared that his half-brother would use the Swedish army to invade Denmark, contracted Starkad to kill Alo. Starkad entered the service of Alo and thrust his sword into him as he was taking a bath. In the Ynglinga saga, Áli son of Friðleifr defeated the Swedish king Aun who fled to Västergötland, and Áli was king at Uppsala for 20 years until Starkad killed him. He also appears in Sögbrot and Gesta Danorum at the Battle of Brávellir. He is reported to have been the greatest of the Swedish king Sigurd Ring's warriors, and to have brought many famous kings and warriors, including Starkad. Soon after the battle, Ale was treacherously murdered by Starkad, his last evil deed.		Ynglinga saga, Skjöldunga saga, Hyndluljóð (14), Norna-Gests þáttr, Sögubrot, Gesta Danorum (VII)	
Alewih	Old English: Alewih		The name is attested as Alweo in Mercian chronicles, and as Alahwih and Alawig in German sources. The first element is cognate with Gothic alhs ("shrine"), and the second element is PGmc *wiga ("fight").	A Danish king mentioned in line 35 of Widsith, but who is not known elsewhere. The poem says he was the boldest of men but not as bold as Offa of Angeln.	Widsith		
Alexander the Great	Old English: Alexandreas	Historical.	The Old English form has been explained as a blend of the names Alexander and Andreas.	Mentioned in line 15 in Widsith.	Widsith		
Alf^{1}	Old Norse: Álfr or Old Norse: Ǫolfr, Latin: Alverus	May be based on a historic 5th c. Swedish king.	From PN *Aþawulfaz from *aþa- (*aþala meaning "noble" or "prominent") and *wulfaz("wolf"). He may have been named after the contemporary 5th c. Visigothic king Athaulf and his father Alrekr after the first Visigothic king Alaric I.	According to Ynglinga saga, he ruled as king of Sweden together with his brother Yngvi^{1} and they were the sons of Alrekr and the grandsons of Agne. However, according to Íslendingabók, Alrekr preceded Agne who preceded his brother Yngvi^{1}. In Gesta Danorum, Álfr (Alverus) is the father of Yngvi^{1} who is duplicated as the two brothers Ingo and Ingeldus. Based on Snorri's retelling of Ynglingatal, he ruled together with his brother Yngvi^{1}, but his brother preferred to pillage abroad. Alf's wife Bera preferred the manly and outgoing Yngve to her timid and sullen husband Alfr, and she did not hide it. One evening when Alfr saw Yngvi^{1} converse with Bera, he unexpectedly pulled his sword and killed his brother with it, but before dying, Yngvi^{1} did the same with Alfr.		Ynglingatal, Ynglinga saga, Gesta Danorum	
Alf^{2}	Old Norse: Álfr		Álfr- means "elf", a race of supernatural subterranean beings, from PN *Albiz (or *Albaz), or from *Aþawulfaz, see Álfr^{1}.	Alf was the son of a king named Hunding who was killed by Sigmund's son Helgi, who thus earned himself the cognomen Hundingsbane. Helgakviða Hundingsbana I tells that Helgi refused to give his sons compensation, and so they attacked him but were defeated and killed. The Völsunga saga names them Alf^{2} and Eyjolf, Hervard^{2} and Hagbard^{2}, but Helgakviða Hundingsbana I and II call them Alf^{2} and Eyjolf, Hjorvard^{3} and Havard. Helgakviða Hundingsbana II adds a brother named Heming, and the Völsunga saga adds yet another brother called king Lyngvi who killed Sigmund in battle. Norna-Gests þáttr tells that in the first battle against Helgi Hundingsbane, his brothers Eyjolf, Hervard and Hjörvard were slain, but Lyngvi, Alf and Heming escaped to be killed later in battle against Sigurd.		Helgakviða Hundingsbana I, Helgakviða Hundingsbana II, Völsunga saga, Norna-Gests þáttr	
Alf^{3}	Old Norse: Álfr or Hálfr		See Álfr^{2}.	In the Völsunga saga and in Frá dauða Sinfjǫtla (there called Hálfr, as in Guðrúnarkviða II and in ch. 38 of Völsunga saga), Alf is the son of king Hjalprek. The Völsunga saga tells that Alf arrives with his fleet to the battle field where Lyngvi has defeated Sigmund. There he finds Hjördís and one of her maids beside the dying Sigmund, and he takes them as captives and keeps them as thralls until he finds out Hjördís background, and then he marries her. Consequently, Sigurd was born in captivity, cf. Fáfnismál. Frá dauða Sinfjǫtla only tells that Hjördís married Hálf, the son of king Hjalprek, and that Sigurd grew up at his court.		Völsunga saga, Frá dauða Sinfjǫtla, Guðrúnarkviða II, Norna-Gests þáttr	
Alf^{4}	Old Norse: Álfr		See Álfr^{2}.	A king of Denmark and father of Æsa. He learns that Buðli^{2}, the king of Sweden, is old and attacks him. Buðli^{2}'s daughter Hildr^{2} is married to Helgi Hildibrandsson, but as Helgi is away on a war expedition, the Swedes cannot rely on his help and are defeated. King Buðli^{2} is slain, and Alf's champion Áki^{1} kidnaps Hildr^{2} with whom he has the son Asmund. Hildr^{2} already has another son with her previous husband Helgi, named Hildibrand^{1} who is being raised at his Hunnish grandfather Hildibrand^{2}'s court. When Hildibrand^{1} is old enough he avenges his maternal grandfather and kills Alf^{4}, but not Aki^{1} as he is away on a raid.		Ásmundar saga kappabanna	
Alf^{5}	Old Norse: Álfr	Possibly historical.	See Álfr^{2}.	According to the Ynglinga saga, Alf and Agnar^{3} were the sons of king Ingvar of Fjädrundaland. As their names alliterate and are identical to some found in the Yngling dynasty, they may have been members of the royal dynasty. One Midwinter sacrifice at Uppsala, Alf made the Swedish prince Ingjald, who was the weaker boy, almost cry with frustration. When Svipdag^{3} learnt of this from Ingjald's foster-brother Gautvid, he was disgusted and roasted a wolf's heart and had Ingjald eat it. Many years later, when Ingjald was king of Sweden, he invited Agnar, Alf and their father Ingvar, together with a number of other petty kings to a feast at Uppsala. However, at night the doors were barred and he hall set on fire, burning everyone inside to death. After this Ingjald expanded his realm.		Ynglinga saga	
Alf^{6}	Old Norse: Álfr, Latin: Aluuer		See Álfr^{2}.	A son of king Hring^{1} who is allied with the kings Högni^{3} and Granmar. Before the impending battle with Helgi Hundingsbane, Hothbrodd asks the messengers to send for Hring^{1}'s sons Atli^{1}, Yngvi^{2} and Alfr^{6} the Hoary. Elias Wessén agrees with Sophus Bugge's identification of Hring as the Swedish king Sigurd Ring, and considers Atli^{1}, Yngvi^{2} and Alfr^{6} to be the same men as Áli, Yngvi and Alf of the Swedish Yngling dynasty who are counted among the warriors in the Battle of the Brávellir.		Helgakviða Hundingsbana I, Gesta Danorum (VIII)	
Alf^{7}	Old Norse: Álfr		See Álfr^{2}.	Alf was the son of king Hrothmar who wanted the most beautiful woman Sigrlinn, the daughter of king Sváfnir of Svávaland. Hrothmar invaded Svávaland and killed king Sváfnir, but he could not find Sigrlinn who was instead found and married by king Hjörvard^{4}. Sigrlinn and Hjörvard^{4} would have the son Helgi Hjörvardsson who would avenge his maternal grandfather by killing Hrothmar. Helgi would in turn be killed by Hrothmar's son Alf^{7}, and the lay Helgakvíða Hjörvarðssonar ends with Helgi's brother Hethin preparing to kill Alf^{7} in turn.		Helgakvíða Hjörvarðssonar	
Alf^{8} the Old	Old Norse: Álfr		See Álfr^{2}.	In Hversu, Alf (also called Finnalf) appears with his kingdom Alfheim (corresponds to modern Bohuslän). It adds that his father was Raum and his grandfather Nór, and that he married Svanhild Gold-Feather, the daughter of the Norse god Dagr, the son of the Norse god Dellingr and his wife, the sun goddess. He also appears with Alfheim and its rivers in Þórsteins saga Víkingssonar, but it makes Alf the brother-in-law of Raum instead. Sögubrot talks of the rivers and the beauty of the inhabitants of his kingdom. The Ad catalogum regum, mentions Alf, the son of Raum, and talks of how beautiful his people, the "elf-kin", were and that his daughter Alfhild^{3} married the Swedish king Sigurd Ring with whom she had the son Ragnar Lodbrok. Sögubrot first relates that he was the father of Alfhild^{3}, but later calls her father Gandalf instead. It later relates that Sigurd Ring's son Ragnar Lodbrok had inherited the Elvish beauty of his Elf mother Alfhild^{3}, a descendant of Alf the Old. In Hervarar saga (U-version) and in Gautreks saga, there are accounts of Starkad Ala-warrior kidnapping his daughter Alfhild^{3} and Alf calling on Thor to help him. The god kills Starkad, but when she comes home, she is with child.		Hversu, Þórsteins saga Víkingssonar, Sögubrot, Hyndluljóð, Ad catalogum regum Sveciæ annotanda, Hervarar saga (U-version), Gautreks saga	
Alf^{9} of Vendel, Alf^{10}	Old Norse: Álfr		See Álfr^{2}.	In Ad catalogum, Alf^{9} of Vendel is a petty king who is visiting the great sacrifices at Skiringssal in Viken with his daughter Alfsol and his sons Yngvi^{3} (Ingvi, Ingvone) and Alf^{10}. Another visitor is Sigurd Ring (Sigvard Ring), the king of Sweden and Denmark, who falls in love with his daughter Alfsol. Considering the king too old for Alfsol they kill her by poisoning rather than letting Sigurd have her. The wrinkled old king kills both Alf's young sons in a duel but is severely wounded himself.		Ad catalogum regum Sveciæ annotanda	
Alfar	Old Norse: Álfarr		The first element Álf-, means "elf", a race of supernatural subterranean beings, see Álfr^{2}. The second element -arr, can have three different origins: *-harjaʀ ("war chief, warrior"), *-warjaʀ ("defender") or *-ʒaiʀaʀ ("spear").	Alfar and Alfarin were the sons of Gandalf, the king of Alfheim, and served as the Danish king Harald Wartooth's personal bodyguard, in the Battle of Brávellir against the Swedish king Sigurd Ring. Sigurd Ring had married their sister Alfhild^{3} and they would later ask him to aid them in battle. In Gesta Danorum, they are mentioned (but not named) as participants in the Battle of Brávellir, and as being intimate with Harald Wartooth for having served him for a long time.		Sögubrot, Gesta Danorum (VIII)	
Alfarin^{1}	Old Norse: Álfarinn		The first element Álf-, means "elf", a race of supernatural subterranean beings, see Álfr^{2}. The second element -arinn may mean "eagle" or "hearth".	Alfarinn was the king of Alfheim (roughly modern Bohuslän), and he married his daughter Alfhild^{4} off to Gudrød the Hunter. As a dowry, he gave Gudrød half of Vingulmark. His successor, Alfgeir would retake the dowry.		Ynglinga saga	
Alfarin^{2}	Old Norse: Álfarinn		See Alfarinn^{1}.	Alfarin and his brother Alfar were the sons of Gandalf, the king of Alfheim, and served as the Danish king Harald Wartooth's personal bodyguard, in the Battle of Brávellir against the Swedish king Sigurd Ring. Sigurd Ring had married their sister Alfhild^{3} and they would later ask him to aid them in battle. In Gesta Danorum, they are mentioned (but not named) as participants in the Battle of Brávellir, and as being intimate with Harald Wartooth for having served him for a long time.		Sögubrot, Gesta Danorum (VIII)	
Alfgeir	Old Norse: Álfgeirr		The first element Álf-, means "elf", a race of supernatural subterranean beings, see Álfr^{2}. The second element -geirr means "spear".	Alfgeir was the king of the king of Alfheim (roughly modern Bohuslän). He retook Vingulmark that his predecessor Alfarin had given in dowry to Gudrød the Hunter, and assigned it to his son Gandalf.		Ynglinga saga	
Ælfhere^{1}	Old English: Ælfhere		PN *Albiharjaz, where the first element is from PN *Albiz/Albaz meaning "Elf", and the second element is *harjaz, the same as Gothic harjis meaning "host", "warrior" or "war chief".	It has been proposed that Ælfhere refers to Beowulf himself, and that Beowulf was his nickname. Ælfhere is mentioned as one of Wiglaf's kinsmen, and in connection with his Scylfing heritage, and his name follows the Scylfing tradition of beginning with an alliterating vowel. Like Ecgþeow, he is often assumed to be a Wægmunding.	Beowulf		
Ælfhere^{2}	Old English: Ælfhere, Middle High German: Alphere or Alpkêr		See Ælfhere^{1} In the variant Alpkêr, the second element is MHG gêr ("spear").	Ælfhere is the father of Walter of Aquitaine, Attila's foremost warrior. In Waltharius, he gives Walter to Attila as a hostage. In Walther und Hildegund, he waits for Walter and Hildegund at Langres. Walter had inherited a gold-studded armour from him.	Waldere		Waltharius, Rabenschlacht, Walther und Hildegund
Alfhild^{1}	Old Norse: Álfhildr		As an element in a dithematic name álfr- means "elf", a race of supernatural subterranean beings, from PN *Albiz (or *Albaz) while -hildr is from PN *heldiō- ("strife, conflict")	In the Hervarar saga mentioned as the daughter of Ivar Vidfamne in the place of Auðr the Deep-Minded. He marries her off to Valdar^{2} and they have the sons Harald Wartooth and Randver.^{2}		Hervarar saga	
Alfhild^{2}	Old Norse: Álfhildr		See Alfhild^{1}.	In Helgakvíða Hjörvarðssonar, Alfhild is one of four wives of Hjörvard^{4}, a king in Norway. With Alfhild^{2} he had son named Hedin, with Særeid a son named Humlung, and with Sinriód a son named Hymling. Helgakviða Hjörvarðssonar deals with how he won his fourth wife, Sigrlinn, the daughter of king Svafnir of Svavaland, and the story of their son Helgi Hjörvarðsson.		Helgakviða Hjörvarðssonar	
Alfhild^{3}	Old Norse: Álfhildr		See Alfhild^{1}.	The Ad catalogum and the U-version of Hervarar saga, mention Alf^{8}, the son of Raum, and talks of how beautiful his people, the "elf-kin" of Alfheim (roughly modern Bohuslän) were. Hervarar saga also talks of the beauty of his daughter Alfhild^{3} and that she was abducted by Starkad Ala-warrior while performing the Disablot to the Disir. King Alf calls on Thor who kills Starkad and liberates Alfhild^{3}, but during the abduction she bore Starkad a daughter named Bauggerðr who marries Grímr. In Gautreks saga, Starkad impregnates her with Stórvirkr instead. In Ad catalogum she marries the Swedish king Sigurd Ring with whom she has the son Ragnar Lodbrok. Sögubrot first relates that her father was Alf^{8}, but later identifies him as Gandalf instead. It later tells that Sigurd Ring's son Ragnar Lodbrok had inherits the Elvish beauty of his Elf mother Alfhild^{3}, a descendant of Alf^{8} the Old.		Hversu, Þórsteins saga Víkingssonar, Sögubrot, Ad catalogum regum Sveciæ annotanda, Gautreks saga, Hervarar saga (U-version)	
Alfhild^{4}	Old Norse: Álfhildr		See Alfhild^{1}.	Alfhild^{4} was the daughter of Alfarinn, the king of the king of Alfheim (roughly modern Bohuslän). She married Gudrød the Hunter, and as a dowry, Gudrød acquired half of Vingulmark. Before she died they had the son Olaf Geirstad-Alf.		Ynglinga saga	
Alfsol	Old Norse: Álfsól		For the first element, see Álfr^{2}. The second element, Sól, means "the Sun" who was a goddess.	According to Ad catalogum, Alfsol was a beautiful virgin who was visiting the great sacrifices at Skiringssal in Viken with her father Alf^{9} of Vendel and her brothers Yngvi^{3} (Ingvi, Ingvone) and Alf^{10}. She caught the attention of another visitor who was recently widowed, king Sigurd Ring (Sigvard Ring) of Sweden and Denmark, and who fell in love with her. Considering Sigurd too old for her, her brothers killed her by poisoning rather than letting Sigurd have her. The wrinkled old king killed both her brothers in a duel but was severely wounded himself. Sigurd arranged his dead beloved's funeral by loading a great longship with Alfsol and her brothers. As the only living person, he went aboard the ship and sat at the stern beside Alfsol's corpse. He then ordered the ship to be set on fire, and raised the sails high, sailing out on the seas with the strong winds. He had told his men that he meant to meet Odin according to the customs of his ancestors rather than die as an old man in bed. Following his instructions, his men raised a mound in his memory and named it Ringshaug.		Ad catalogum regum Sveciæ annotanda	
Ælfwine				See Alboin			
Algaut	Old Norse: Algautr	Probably fictive with his name derived from his kingdom Västergötland (Gautland).	The first element in the name Algautr is derived from PGmc *al(l)a ("all, whole"), *alu ("protection"), *aþal- ("noble", "prominent") or from Alfr ("a kind of subterranean being"). The second element is gautr meaning "inhabitant of Götaland", "Geat".	The king of the Geats in Västergötland. He married Alof^{2} the daughter of Olaf the Keen-eyed of Nerike and they had the daughter Gauthild who was married to the Swedish king Ingjald ill-ruler. The latter killed him at a feast at Uppsala by arson.		Ynglinga saga, Af Upplendinga Konungum	
Áli				For Áli of Norwegian Oppland, see the entry Onela, and for Áli the Bold/Strong (hin frœkni), see the entry Ale the Strong.			
Alíus and Olíus	Old Norse: Alíus and Olíus		Alíus is Latin and means "second" or "other", cf. the dwarf name Annar. If Olíus is derived from Latin ille through the form ollus, the two names mean "that one" and "the other one".	Two dwarfs who compete with the smiths of king Buðli^{2} to make a three swords. When one breaks, they are forced to reforge the sword and they curse it; this sword will later kill Hildebrand^{1}. The curse is that it will cause the death of two noble brothers, the king's daughter's sons. In anger the king strikes at them, but the dwarves disappear into the ground. The king has a case of lead made for the sword and sinks it down into lake Mälaren by Agnafit.		Ásmundar saga kappabanna	
Alof^{1}	Old Norse: Álǫf or Ōlǫf		A feminine form of the male name Olafr.	In Helgakvíða Hjörvarðssonar, Alof is the daughter of Franmar, the jarl of king Svafnir of Svavaland. Franmar is also the foster-father of Sigrlinn the daughter of king Svafnir. King Hjörvard^{4} wants to marry Sigrlinn and sends Atli^{2}, the son of his jarl Idmund, to negotiate with Svafnir, but Franmar advises against it. Franmar had previously appeared to Atli in the form of a bird demanding and exorbitant price for her. Hjörvard and Atli ride to Svavaland and find it being invaded and pillaged by Sigrlinn's second suitor Hrodmar who has already killed Svafnir. In the form of an eagle, Franmar magically protects the building where he has housed Álof and Sigrlinn. When Atli finds the house and the entranced eagle, he kills it and takes the girls. Atli marries Alof while Hjörvard marries Sigrlinn with whom he has the son Helgi Hjörvardsson, the hero of Helgakvíða Hjörvarðssonar.		Helgakvíða Hjörvarðssonar	
Alof^{2}	Old Norse: Álǫf or Ōlǫf		See Alof^{1}.	A princess of Nerike, and the daughter of its king Olaf the Keen-eyed. She was married to king Algaut of Västergötland and they had the daughter Gauthild who was married to the Swedish king Ingjald ill-ruler.		Af Upplendinga Konungum, Ynglinga saga	
Alof^{3}	Old Norse: Álǫf or Ōlǫf		See Alof^{1}.	In Hervarar saga the daughter of the king of the Saxons, and married to Heidrek. He returns her to her father after proven infidelity. In Hrólfs saga kraka, a warrior queen of the Saxons; when Halga (Helgi) tries to marry her she disgraces her, and as a result he rapes her. She is the mother of Yrsa, whom she does not inform of her parentage resulting in incest with her father. She later allows Yrsa to marry Eadgils (Adils).		Hervarar saga, Hrólfs saga kraka	
Alphart	Middle High German: Alphart		First element MHG alp- ("elf"), second element MHG -hart ("hard").	Dietrich's vassal, nephew of Hildebrand^{1} and brother of Wolfhart. He is treacherously killed by Witige and Háma in Alpharts Tod, but also dies and is mourned in other epics.			Dietrichs Flucht, Rabenschlacht, Alpharts Tod, Heldenbuch-Prosa.
Alruna	Old High German: Ailrun (Pforzen Buckle), Old Norse: Ǫlrún		The Norse form begins with PGmc alu-, meaning "protection". The form of the Pforzen Buckle begins with an otherwise unattested *ail-, probably related to OE āl- ("fire"). The second element is PGmc *rūnō- ("secret"). The name is probably of West Germanic origin.	A valkyrie and a swan maiden. She is the daughter of Kiarr. Egil^{1} marries her, but after seven winters she is no longer bound to her and leaves. After this, Egil^{1} seeks for her.		Völundarkviða	
Alsvid	Old Norse: Alsviðr		The name means "very fast" in ON.	Son of Heimir^{2}, Brynhild's nephew, and a friend of Sigurd's who advises Sigurd to stay away from his aunt Brynhild. His advice is ignored.		Völsunga saga	
Amalaberga	Latin: Amalaberga	Historic niece of the Gothic king Theodoric the Great, who married the Thuringian king Hermanafrid to cement an alliance between the Thuringians and Goths against the Franks in 510.	The element amal- suggests membership in the Amal dynasty and is probably derived from Gothic *amals ("brave"), the second element is *berga, meaning "protector".	According to Widukind's Deeds of the Saxons, Amalaberga was the legitimate daughter of the Frankish king Huga. She was married to the Thuringian king Hermanafrid. When Huga's illegitimate son Theuderic (the historical Theuderic I) succeeded her father and sought the friendship of Hermanafrid, Amalaberga convinced him to rebuff the offer. In revenge, Theuderic had Hermanafrid's vassal Iring kill the king, but Iring then killed him as well.			Deeds of the Saxons
Ambri and Assi	Latin: Ambri, Assi		The name Ambri may be derived from the tribe called Ambrones, while Assi is from *ansiz ("pagan god").	The Historia Langobardorum, Ambri and Assi were the leaders of the Vandals and demanded that the Winili pay tribute to them or face war. Consulting their mother Gambara, they opted for war instead, and sent a messenger to the Vandals that they would rather fight than be slaves. The Winnili settler were few in number, but young and healthy. Gambara addressed the goddess Frigg (Frēa), and she told her that the Winnili women should but their hair in front of their faces like beards, and stand next to their men. When the god Odin (Godan) saw them in the morning he asked who the "long beards" were, and Frigg prevailed on Odin to give the Winnili victory against the Vandals, and the Winnili were from then on called Lombards ("long beards").	Origo Gentis Langobardorum, Historia Langobardorum		
Amelgart^{1}	Middle High German: Amelgart		The element amal- suggests membership in the Amal dynasty and is probably derived from Gothic *amals ("brave"), the second element is PGmc *garda ("fence, fenced in area").	The mother of king Ortnit.			Ortnit
Amelgart^{2}	Middle High German: Amelgart		See Amelgart^{1}	Alphart's betrothed.			Alpharts Tod
Amelung^{1}	Middle High German: Amelunc, also Abelon, Abelunc, Amelolt, etc.		Name probably derived from Gothic *amals (bravery, vigor), and indicates membership in the Amal dynasty.	A vassal of Dietrich von Bern, Hildebrand^{1}'s brother-in-law, and the father of Wolfhart, Sigestap, and Alphart. In the Jüngeres Hildebrandslied, he warns Hilderband about his son Alebrand (Hadubrand). In the Rosengarten zu Worms, he aids Dietrich in his tournament against the Burgundians. In Þiðreks saga, this name is used of two unrelated individuals, the son of the Hunnish vassal Hornboge and the nephew of Else^{1}.			Dietrichs Flucht, Rosengarten zu Worms, Heldenbuch-Prosa, Jüngeres Hildebrandslied
Amie	Middle High German: Âmîe		From MHG âmîe ("beloved"), from Old French amie ("female friend").	The daughter of Wernher von Wernheres Mark, Wolfdietrich wins a tournament for her and then arranges for her to marry his vassal Herbrand (Heribrand). She is the mother of Hildebrand^{1}, Ilsan, Nere, and Mergart.			Wolfdietrich
Amlungr^{2}	Old Norse: Amlungr or Aumlungr		See Amelung^{1}	The son of the Hunnish vassal Hornboge (Hornbogi). He joins Dietrich's men and Dietrich sends his sword and shield to Isung as a gift when the latter demands tribute. Isung's messenger, Sigurd, allows Amlungr to bind him to a tree and recover the gifts, but Witige does not believe Amlungr that this has happened.			Þiðreks saga
Amlungr^{3}	Old Norse: Amlungr or Aumlungr		See Amelung^{1}	The nephew of Else^{1}, he is defeated by Hildebrand^{1} when Dietrich returns from exile to Bern.			Þiðreks saga
Andvari	Old English: Andvari		The name means the "careful one". The element and- means "towards" and -varr means "careful, watchful", and a nominative suffix forming masculine nouns from adjectives -i.	He is a dwarf who appears in Völuspá, Reginsmál and in the Þulur. Reginsmál relates that Loki catches him with a net and Andvari has to buy his freedom with gold. However, a part of this gold is a ring that he curses, and this curse becomes part of the fate of the Nibelungs.	Völuspá, Reginsmál, Þulur		
Angantyr^{1}	Old Norse: Angantýr, possibly Old English: Incgenþēow,	Unknown, possibly a historical figure from modern Ukraine.	Cognate with OE Ongenþēow and OHG Angandeo, but the first element is obscure, and the name has been interpreted as "opposite of a servant" or "favoured servant". The form Angantýr appears to be Scandinavized consistent with its origin in Gothic traditions, as the second element does not have the expected form -þér, but seems to come from a continental form such as -tio/teo.	Son of Heidrek and the Gothic princess Helga, daughter of king Harald. When a famine is to be averted Heidrek accepts to sacrifice Angantýr on condition that he has temporary command of half (or a fourth of) the Gothic army, which he uses to kill the king and his son instead, assuming power over the Goths. When Heidrek is killed by thralls, he avenges his father and takes the cursed sword Tyrfing. He refuses to give his half brother Hlöd, who has grown up among the Huns, more than a third of the kingdom, which causes a Hunnish invasion. Angantýr wins the war and rules a long time over the goths. He became an ancestor of Scandinavian kings through his son Heidrek Wolf skin and granddaughter Hildr.	Possibly in Widsith.	Hervarar saga	
Angantyr^{2}	Old Norse: Angantýr, Latin: Anganterus,		See Angantyr^{1}	Son of Arngrim and Eyfura, brother of Hjörvard^{1} and ten more brothers. Angantýr receives the cursed sword Tyrfing from his father. He and his brothers fight a battle against Hjálmar and Orvar-Odd for Hjörvard's (or his) right to marry Ingiborg, the daughter of king Ingjald (or Yngvi^{1}) of Sweden. During the battle on Samsø he is slain by Hjálmar but Hjálmar dies from his wounds. Angantýr was buried on the island with the sword. He was married to Sváfa^{2}, the daughter of Bjarmarr, and they had a daughter named Hervor^{2} who came to his barrow to take the cursed sword.		Hervarar saga, Gesta danorum, Hyndluljóð, Frithiof's saga	
Angantýr^{3}	Old Norse: Angantýr		See Angantýr^{1}.	The son of king Höfund of Glæsisvellir and queen Hervor^{2}, he is good-natured like his father, and also handsome and big and strong. At a great feast that his father has organized in Grund, in the kingdom, his ill-natured brother Heidrek is in a bad mood and kills him.		Hervarar saga	
Anund	Old Norse: Braut-Ǫnundr		From PN *Anuwinduz. The first element is from *anuz ("ancestor") and the second element is from an agent noun based on the PIE root *wen- ("to win"). Braut- means "a road cut through rocks".	King of Sweden and the son of king Ingvar, he ravaged Estonia far and wide to avenge his father. Then he started a project of infrastructure and colonization in his kingdom. He was the father of Ingjald. The account of his death is unclear and contradictory. He was either killed by a mountain slide, by being stoned to death, or murdered by his bastard brother Sigvard.		Historia Norwegiæ, Ynglinga saga, Þorsteins saga Víkingssonar	
Anund Uppsale	Old Norse: Ǫnundr uppsali	May be the Anund/Emund who was living as an exile in Denmark, while his brother Björn ruled, as mentioned by Rimbert.	See Anund.	The Hervarar saga tells that Anund and his brother Björn were the sons of Refil, who was the son of Björn Ironside, the son of Ragnar Lodbrok. They divided the Swedish kingdom between themselves when their uncle Eric died. They were succeeded by Anund's son Eric. However, the reading of the name as Anund is not uncontested, because some translators of the manuscripts of Hervarar saga have read Emund instead of Anund, which agrees with Snorri Sturluson's Kings' sagas, where his son has the patronym Eymundarson or Emundarson.		Hervarar saga	
Antzius	Middle High German: Antzîus or Middle High German: Anzigus	He shares his name with Ansegisel (died c. 672), father of Pippin II.	The first element in the name is probably PGmc *ans- ("god"). The name of the Frankish Ansegisel was altered to more closely resemble Anchises.	The father of Hugdietrich and king of Greece.			Wolfdietrich, Heldenbuch-Prosa
Arngrim	Old Norse: Arngrímr		Both Arn- and -grímr were common elements in names. The first one, Ar(i)n-, means "eagle", and grímr means "mask", but it may have been conflated with grimmr meaning "cruel".	A berserker. Depending on the version he either kills Svafrlami or becomes his champion. He marries his daughter Eyfura, and takes the cursed sword Tyrfing. He has twelve sons who also are berserkers, among whom the ones named Angantýr^{2} and Hjörvard^{1}.		Hervarar saga, Gesta Danorum, Örvar-Odds saga, Hyndluljóð	
Arngrim (giant)	Old Norse: Arngrímr		See Arngrim, above.	Arngrímr was a giant who kidnapped Ymir's daughter Áma ("big barrel") and kept her as his wife. They had the son Hergrímr, who was the grandfather of Arngrímr the berserker (above).		Hervarar saga (U-version)	
Åsa^{1}	Old Norse: Ása		Ása is a hypocoristic form of female names beginning with Ās-/Æs-, from *ansuʀ ("god").	The Ynglinga saga tells she was the daughter of the Swedish king Ingjald Ill-ruler, who married her off to Guðröðr of Skåne. She slandered his brother Halfdan the Valiant so that Guðröðr killed him, and having done so, she arranged the death of Guðröðr himself. Then she fled back to her father in Sweden. Åsa and her father committed suicide by burning themselves to death inside their hall at Ræning, together with their retinue, to avoid the vengeance of Halfdan's son Ivar Vidfamne.		Ynglinga saga	
Åsa^{2}	Old Norse: Ása		See Åsa^{1}.	In Ynglinga saga, she was the daughter of king Harald Red-Beard of Agder who refused to give his daughter to Gudrød the Hunter of Vestfold. The latter would not accept the refusal, and so he attacked Harald's hall in the night and killed both Harald and his son Gyrðr. Gudrød took Åsa by force and with her he had the son Halfdan the Black. In revenge, Åsa made her servant kill Gudrød with a spear at a banquet, as he was walking down the gangway from his ship. She openly admitted to having asked her servant to do so. The Historia Norwegiæ only reports that she betrayed her husband by making a young man stab him.		Ynglingatal, Ynglinga saga, Historia Norwegiæ	
Æsa the Fair	Old Norse: Æsa inn fagra		See Åsa.	The daughter of the Danish king Álfr^{4}. She decides that she will marry the man who has the most beautiful hands after the summer's raiding season. When the autumn arrives, her suitor Eyvindr has stayed with the cooks and protected his hands in gloves, while Asmund's hands are leathery and full of scars, and tanned with the blood of the men he has slain. Seeing Eyvind's white and soft hands, she declares that they cannot compare in beauty to Asmund's manly hands. She will marry Asmund, but first he has to avenge her father, who has been killed in revenge by Hildibrand^{1}. Asmund warns her of the Hunnish warrior's reputation as a fighter, but she tells him of the cursed sword that is submerged in Mälaren near Agnafit. When he returns with the sword, she tells him that the Saxons have been subjugated by the Huns and that he should go to them. After he has killed Hildibrand^{1} (who was his half-brother), they marry but not before he has killed a new suitor.		Ásmundar saga kappabanna	
Æschere	Old English: Æschere		From PGmc *asca- ("ash tree") and harjaz ("host, army").	Hrothgar's advisor. He is killed by Grendel's mother.	Beowulf		
Aslaug^{1}	Old Norse: Áslaug, Kráka, Randalín, Latin: Aslauga, Asluga, Suanlogha and Suanluga		The second element -laug is the feminine form of laugʀ from PGmc *lauʒ- (the same as Gothic liugan) meaning "to marry", "to give a sacred promise" and as a name element it would have meant "promised to" or "initiated to". The first element is Ás- from PN *ansuʀ ("pagan god") The first element svan ("swan") in the Latin form Suanlogha, i.e. Svanlaug, is an influence from the legend of Svanhild from which other names appear in the account in Gesta Danorum such as Grimilda and Guthruna. Kráka means "crow". The name Randalín which she is called in Ragnars saga loðbrókar, when she joins her sons to avenge their brothers Agnarr^{4} and Eric^{3} in Sweden, is probably from Randa-Hlín, which means "shield-goddess", i.e. a kenning for "Valkyrie".	Aslaug was the daughter of Sigurd and the shield-maiden Brynhild. The latter's foster-father Heimir protected the girl by carrying her in a harp until he was murdered by the poor couple Grima and Aki^{2} in Spangereid for the riches they perceived in the harp. They raised her as a poor peasant girl, until she was discovered by Ragnar Lodbrok's men seeing her beauty bathing. He requested that she come to him neither dressed nor undressed, neither alone nor in company and neither sated nor fasting. She came with a dog, dressed in a net and biting an onion. They married and had the sons Ivar the Boneless, Björn Ironside, Hvitserk^{2} and Rognvald. At a banquet with his friend the Swedish king Eysteinn Beli, he promised to divorce Aslaug for Eystein's daughter. Aslaug was furious and told him who her real parents were, and to prove it she would bear a son whose eye had the image of a serpent, and she bore Sigurd Snake-in-the-Eye. Eysteinn became Ragnar's enemy, and was later killed by his sons. It was due to having disregarded advice from Aslaug that Ragnar was defeated and killed in England by king Ælla of Northumbria. In Gesta Danorum (IX), her counterpart is Suanlogha (Svanlaug) who bore Ragnar the sons Ragnald, Hvitserk^{2} and Eric^{3}.		Skáldatal, Völsunga saga, Ragnars saga loðbrókar, Ragnarssona Þáttr, Krákumál, Ad catalogum regum Sveciæ annotanda, Gesta Danorum (IX)	
Aslaug^{2}	Old Norse: Áslaug		See Aslaug^{1}	Aslaug^{2} was the daughter of Sigurd Snake-in-the-Eye and Blaeja, the daughter of king Ælla of Northumbria. She was the twin sister of Horda-Knut and she was given her name by her grandmother Aslaug^{1}. She married Helgi the Keen of Ringerike, and they had the son Sigurd Hart.		Ragnarssona Þáttr	
Asmund	Old Norse: Ásmundr, Latin: Haldanus		The name is composed of Ás- from PN *ansuʀ ("pagan god") and -mundr from PN -munduʀ ("protector").	Asmund is the son of Aki^{1}, the champion of the Danish king Alf^{4}, and the kidnapped Swedish princess Hildr^{2}, who is already married and has the son Hildibrand^{1}, who is being raised among the Huns. Ásmund's half-brother Hildibrand^{1} (Hildiger) avenges his grandfather the Swedish king Buðli^{2} who was killed when his mother was abducted, by killing the Danish king Alf^{1}. Asmund wants to marry Alf^{1}'s daughter Æsa, and wins her against a competing suitor by having hands marked by long pillaging, but she demands that he avenges her father first. She tells him to first retrieve a cursed sword that has been sunk into lake Mälaren and then to go to the Saxons. The Saxons have lost most of their estates to his half-brother and the Huns during annual duels, and Asmund undertakes to retrieve them by duelling with the Hunnish champions. First he kills one, then two, then four, then five, then six, and then seven regaining for the Saxons an estate for every killed champion. Then Hildibrand^{1} sends his last 11 against him, who are also killed. In berserker rage Hildibrand^{1} rides to meet him and kills his own son (Hadubrand) on the way, but is killed by Asmund. He returns home, kills a new competing suitor, and marries Æsa.		Gesta Danorum Ásmundar saga kappabana	
Asprian, Aspilian	Middle High German: Asprîân, Low German: Espriaen, Old Norse: Asplian, Aspilian	An identical figure appears in the minstrel epic König Rother.	Ludwig Uhland and Ernst Martin argues in the 19th century that the name was from *Ansber, from *ansiz ("pagan god") and PGmc *bera ("bear"). Gillespie believes the name is possibly of Old French origin. Hermann Reichert suggests a derivation from a Longobardic *Ansprand, from *ansiz ("pagan god") and "sword" or "conflagration".	A giant. In Þiðrekssaga one of the four giant sons of King Nordian^{1}. He is made king by Oserich/Osantrix after Nordian's death, and aids Oserich in his wars against Attila, but is forced to flee to Austriki (Austria). Later he steals an estate from the monks of the monastery where Heimir (Háma^{1}) has become a monk. Heimir kills him. In Dukus Horant, he accompanies Horant (Heorrenda) on his embassy to King Hagen/Högni^{2}, while he appears as an opponent of Dietrich von Bern in Virginal and as one of Kriemhild's champions in some versions of the Rosengarten zu Worms.			Þiðrekssaga, Dukus Horant, Virginal, Rosengarten zu Worms, Vom Bären Wisselau
Astolt	Middle High German: Astolt		The first element is possibly Gothic asts ("branch"), related to astaþ ("safety").	In the Nibelungenlied, the ruler of Medelicke (Melk); he fights with Biterolf in Biterolf und Dietleib and aids Dietrich von Bern in Die Rabenschlacht.			Nibelungenlied, Rabenschlacht, Biterolf und Dietleib
Assi				See Ambri and Assi			
Ætla				See Attila			
Atli^{1}	Old Norse: Atli		The name is an adaptation of Attila (see below), but it can also be a native Scandinavian name as a weak form of ON atall ("fierce", "evil", "hurtful", "mean") like the name Gamli is derived from gamall ("old").	A son of king Hring^{1} who is allied with the kings Högni^{3} and Granmar. Before the impending battle with Helgi Hundingsbane, Hothbrodd asks the messengers to send for Hring^{1}'s sons Atli^{1}, Yngvi^{2} and Alfr^{6} the Hoary. Elias Wessén agrees with Sophus Bugge's identification of Hring as the Swedish king Sigurd Ring, and considers Atli^{1}, Yngvi^{2} and Alfr^{6} to be the same men as Áli, Yngvi and Alf of the Swedish Yngling dynasty who are counted among the warriors in the Battle of the Brávellir.		Helgakviða Hundingsbana I, Gesta Danorum (VIII), Sögubrot	
Atli^{2}	Old Norse: Atli		See Atli^{1}	In Helgakvíða Hjörvarðssonar, Hjörvard^{4} wanted to marry Sigrlinn, the daughter of king Svafnir of Svavaland. He sent Atli, the son of his jarl Idmund, to negotiate with Svafnir, but Franmar, the girl's foster-father advised against it. Franmar had previously appeared to Atli in the form of a bird demanding and exorbitant price for her. Hjörvard and Atli ride to Svavaland and find it being invaded and pillaged by Sigrlinn's second suitor Hrodmar who has already killed Svafnir. They find the house where Franmar has hidden Sigrlinn and his daughter Álof^{1}, and where he is magically protecting them in the form of an eagle. Atli kills him and then Atli marries Álof^{1} and Hjörvard marries Sigrlinn with whom he has the son Helgi Hjörvardsson, the hero of Helgakvíða Hjörvarðssonar. Atli later helps Helgi avenge his maternal grandfather by killing Hrothmar and he takes part in Helgi's flyting with the giantess Hrimgerd tricking her to stay outside till the sun rises and turns her to stone.		Helgakvíða Hjörvarðssonar	
Attila	Old English: Ætla, Old Norse: Atli, Middle High German: Etzel	Historical king of the Huns c. 406–453.	Probably "Little Father", diminutive of Gothic atta ("father").	King of the Huns and a central figure of Germanic heroic legend. Son of Buðli^{1} (Botelung). In Norse tradition, brother of Brunhild. In German tradition brother of Bleda. In the Nibelungenlied after his marriage to Kriemhild, Attila invites the Burgundian kings to visit. Kriemhild arranges for fighting to break out, resulting in the death of most of Attila's warrior. In the Nibelungenklage, Attila is incapacitated by grief and the narrator states he does not know what happened to him. He serves as a patron for the exiled Dietrich von Bern, repeatedly providing him with armies to attempt to reconquer Lombardy from Ermanaric. In the Þiðreks saga, Dietrich von Bern aids him in various battles against the Veleti and other foes. Both he and his Kriemhild desire the hoard of the Nibelungs and arrange for the Burgundians to be killed. He is killed by Hagen/Högni^{1}'s son Aldrian, who looks him in a cave where he starves to death. In Eddic tradition, he seeks to acquire the hoard of the Nibelungs from the Burgundians, treacherously attacking them once they have arrived at his hall. After he kills them, Gudrun kills his sons and feeds their hearts to him, then kills him.	Widsith, Waldere.	Atlakviða, Atlamál, Guðrúnarkviða II, Guðrúnarkviða III, Oddrúnargrátr, Guðrúnarhvöt, Brot af Sigurðarkviðu, Skáldskaparmál, Völsunga saga, Norna-Gests þáttr, Ásmundar saga kappabana	Waltharius, Annals of Quedlinburg, Nibelungenlied, Nibelungenklage, Þiðreks saga, Dietrichs Flucht, Rabenschlacht, Biterolf und Dietleib, Rosengarten zu Worms, Wunderer. An unnamed "lord of the huns" (Old High German: Hûneo truhtîn) is mentioned in Hildebrandslied.
Auðr the Deep-Minded	Old English: Auðr in djúpúðga		Auðr means "wealth, happiness".	She was given in marriage to Zealand king Hrœrekr slöngvanbaugi, but she wanted his brother Helgi the Sharp^{1}. Her father Ivar Vidfamne took advantage of the situation by telling Hrœrekr that Auðr was unfaithful with Helgi. The ruse was successful and Hrærekr slew his brother Helgi, after which it was easy for Ivar to attack Hrœrekr and to kill him as well. Auðr fled to Garðaríki with her son Harald Wartooth, and married its king, Ráðbarðr, with whom she later had a son named Randver^{2}.		Sögubrot, Hversu Noregr byggdist, Hyndluljóð	
Aun	Old Norse: Aun inn gamli	Probably a historic 5th c. king of Sweden who died at the latest c. 500.	Aun is a contracted form of the name Auðin or Auðun where the first element is Auðr which means "wealth, happiness" and the second element is PGmc *-winiz ("friend"). In Historia Norvegiæ it is written Auchim which is due to a misreading of Authun (Auðun).	A Swedish legendary king that Ynglingatal positions between Jorund and Egil^{2} (Ongentheow). After having suppressed his relatives, he ruled until he was so old that he had to suckle food from a horn. According to the Ynglinga saga, by the 13th c. scholar Snorri Sturluson, Aun sacrificed nine of his ten sons to extend the duration his life. The Old Norse word for dying of old age ánasótt is according to Snorri from another name for Aun which was Áni. Snorri further relates that Aun's fourth son is the origin of the name of the district of Fjädrundaland, his eighth of Attundaland and his tenth of Tiundaland.		Íslendingabók, Ynglingatal, Historia Norwegiæ, Ynglinga saga	
Aurvandill	Old Norse: Aurvandill, Middle High German: Orendel, later Erntehelle		The name may mean "morning star, beam of light" and the first element derives ultimately from IE *ausos ("dawn").	According to Skáldskaparmál, his wife is the seeress Groa, who is able to remove a stone from Thor's head. One of Aurvandill's toes had frozen, and Thor broke it off and placed it as a star in the sky. The German minstrel epic Orendel tells how Orendel of Trier wooed the queen of Jerusalem. In the Heldenbuch-Prosa, Erntehelle is a king of Trier and the first hero.		Skáldskaparmál	Orendel, Heldenbuch-Prosa

== Sources ==
- Brate, Erik (1904). "Agne". In Westrin, Th. (ed.). Nordisk Familjebok. Vol. 1 (2 ed.). p. 349.
- Byock, Jesse (1999). The Saga of King Hrolf Kraki. Penguin Classics. ISBN 014043593X.
- Stories and Ballads of the Far Past. Translated by Chadwick, Nora Kershaw. Cambridge at the University Press. 1921.
- Chambers, R. W. (1912). Widsith. Cambridge University Press.
- Cleasby, Richard; Vigfússon, Gudbrand (1874). An Icelandic-English dictionary. Oxford Clarendon Press.
- Damico, Helen (1984). Beowulf's Wealhtheow and the Valkyrie Tradition. University of Wisconsin Press. ISBN 0-299-09500-2.
- The Saga of King Heidrek the Wise (PDF). Translated by Finch, R. G. London and Edinburgh: Nelson. 1965.
- Finlay, Alison (2010). "The Saga of Ásmundr, Killer of Champions". In Martin, Arnold; Finlay, Alison (eds.). Making History, Essays on the Fornaldarsögur. Viking Society for Northern Research, University College, London. pp. 119–139. ISBN 978-0-903521-84-0.
- Heimskringla (PDF). Vol. 1. Translated by Finlay, Alison; Faulkes, Anthony. Viking Society for Northern Research, University College London. 2016. ISBN 978-0-903521-86-4.
- Friis-Jensen, Karsten, ed. (2015). Saxo Grammaticus Gesta Danorum, The History of the Danes. Vol. 1. Translated by Fisher, Peter. Oxford University Press. ISBN 978-0-19-82052-34.
- Förstemann, Ernst (1900). Altdeutsches Namenbuch, Band 1: Personennamen (2 ed.). Bonn.
- Peters, Edward, ed. (1974). Paul the Deacon: History of the Lombards. Translated by Foulke, William Dudley. Philadelphia: University of Pennsylvania Press. ISBN 0-8122-1079-4.
- Frank, R. (2002). "Ongendus". In Müller, R. (ed.). Reallexikon der Germanischen Altertumskunde. Vol. 22. New York/Berlin: de Gruyter. ISBN 9783110173512.
- Gentry, Francis G.; McConnell, Winder; Müller, Ulrich; Wunderlich, Werner, eds. (2011) [2002]. The Nibelungen Tradition. An Encyclopedia. New York, Abingdon: Routledge. ISBN 978-0-8153-1785-2.
- Gillespie, George T. (1973). Catalogue of Persons Named in German Heroic Literature, 700-1600: Including Named Animals and Objects and Ethnic Names. Oxford: Oxford University. ISBN 978-0-19-815718-2.
- Gutenbrunner, Siegfried (1954). "Über einige Namen in der Nibelungendichtung". Zeitschrift für deutsches Altertum und deutsche Literatur. 84 (1): 44–64. JSTOR 20654647.
- Harðarson, Jón Axel (2004). "Namenwelten: Orts- und Personennamen in historischer Sicht". In van Nahl, Astrid; Elmevik, Lennart; Brink, Stefan (eds.). Reallexikon der Germanischen Altertumskunde. Vol. 44. Walter de Gruyter, Berlin, New York. ISBN 9783110181081.
- Higham, N.J. (1995). An English Empire: Bede and the Early Anglo-Saxon Kings. Manchester and New York: Manchester University Press. ISBN 0719044235.
- Kaliff, Anders; Oestigaard, Terje (2018). Bronze Age Håga and the Viking King Björn, A History of Interpretation and Documentation from AD 818 to 2018. Occasional Papers in Archaeology. Uppsala University. ISBN 978-91-506-2711-4.
- Kaufmann, Hennig (1968). Ergänzungsband zu Ernst Förstemann: Personennamen. Wilhelm Fink.
- Klaeber, Friedrich (2008). Fulk, R.D.; Bjork, Robert E.; Niles, John D. (eds.). Klaeber's Beowulf and The Fight at Finnsburg. University of Toronto Press. pp. 274–277. ISBN 978-0-8020-9843-6.
- Krause, Arnulf (2010). Reclams Lexikon der germanischen Mythologie und Heldensage. Reclam. ISBN 978-3-15-010778-2.
- Phelpstead, Carl, ed. (2001). A History of Norway and the Passion and Miracles of the Blessed Óláfr (PDF). Translated by Kunin, Devra. Viking Society for Northern Research. ISBN 978-0-903521-48-2.
- Larsson, Mats G. (2004). "Götarnas riken". Upptäcktsfärder till Sveriges enande. Atlantis, Stockholm. pp. 179–170. ISBN 9789173535182.
- The Poetic Edda. Translated by Hollander, Lee M. Texas University Press. 1928.
- Lexer, Matthias (1872–1878). Mittelhochdeutsches Handwörterbuch (3 vols.). Hirzel.
- De Gamle Eddadigte. Translated by Jónsson, Finnur. G. E. C. Gats forlag, København. 1932.
- Malone, Kemp (1923). The Literary History of Hamlet, I. The Early Tradition (1967 ed.). Swets & Zeitlinger N.V., Amsterdam.
- Malone, Kemp (1926). "Agelmund and Lamicho". The American Journal of Philology. 47 (7): 319–346. doi:10.2307/289994. JSTOR 289994.
- Malone, Kemp (1930). "Ingeld". Modern Philology. 27 (3): 257–276. doi:10.1086/387833. S2CID 224833211.
- Malone, Kemp (1936). Wisith (1962 ed.). Rosenkilde and Bagger, Copenhagen.
- Miller, Clarence H. (2007). "Fragments of Danish History". ANQ: A Quarterly Journal of Short Articles, Notes and Reviews. 20 (3): 9–22. doi:10.3200/ANQQ.20.3.9-22. S2CID 161363696.
- McTurk, Rory W. (1991). Studies in Ragnars saga Loðbrókar and its Major Scandinavian Analogues. The Society for the Study of Mediæval Languages and Literature, Oxford. ISBN 0-907570-08-9.
- Mueller, Eugen Hartmuth (1939). "Deutung einiger Namen im Nibelungenlied". Monatshefte für Deutschen Unterricht. 31 (6): 274–284. JSTOR 30169580.
- Nagy, Michael S. (2018). "Ásmundar saga kappabanna: Some Inconsistencies Explored". ANQ: A Quarterly Journal of Short Articles, Notes and Reviews. 31 (1): 1–8. doi:10.1080/0895769X.2017.1354176. S2CID 165384985.
- Näsström, Britt-Mari (1996). "Freyja, a Goddess with Many Names". In Billington, Sandra; Green, Miranda (eds.). The Concept of the Goddess. Taylor & Francis Group. pp. 68–77. ISBN 9780203456385.
- Nedoma, Robert (1999). "Die Runeninschrift auf der Gürtelschnalle von Pforzen–ein Zeugnis der germanischen Heldensage". In Bammesberger, Alfred (ed.). Pforzen und Bergakker neue Untersuchungen zu Runeninschriften. Vandenhoeck & Ruprecht. pp. 98–109.
- Neidorf, Leonard (2018b). "Wealhtheow and Her Name: Etymology, Characterization, and Textual Criticism". Neophilologus. 102 (1): 75–89. doi:10.1007/s11061-017-9538-4. S2CID 165875310.
- Nerman, Birger (1919). "Kung Agne och hans död på Agnefit". Fornvännen.
- Nerman, Birger (1925). Svenska rikets uppkomst. Stockholm: Generalstabens litografiska anstalt.
- Noreen, Adolf (1904a). "Aslög". In Westrin, Th. (ed.). Nordisk Familjebok. Vol. 2 (2 ed.). pp. 208–209.
- Noreen, Adolf (1904b). "Aun". In Westrin, Th. (ed.). Nordisk Familjebok. Vol. 2 (2 ed.). pp. 429–430.
- Noreen, Adolf (1922). "Yngve". In Westrin, Th. (ed.). Nordisk Familjebok. Vol. 33 (2 ed.). p. 563.
- Orchard, Andy (1997). Dictionary of Norse Myth and Legend. Cassel, London. ISBN 0-304-34520-2.
- Orel, Vladimir E. (2003). A Handbook of Germanic Etymology. Brill. ISBN 978-90-04-12875-0.
- Seven Viking Romances. Translated by Pálsson, Hermann; Edwards, Paul. Penguin Books. 1985. ISBN 0140444742.
- Peterson, Lena (2004). Lexikon över urnordiska personnamn. Uppsala: Institutet för språk och folkminnen.
- Peterson, Lena (2007). Nordiskt runnamnslexikon. Uppsala: Institutet för språk och folkminnen.
- Reichert, Hermann (1996). "Þiðreks saga und oberdeutsche Heldensage". In Kramarz-Bein, Susanne (ed.). Hansische Literaturbeziehungen: Das Beispiel der Þiðreks saga und verwandter Literatur. Berlin, New York: Walter de Gruyter. pp. 236–265.
- Schneider, Hermann (1934). Germanische Heldensage, Bd. 2,2: Englische Heldensage - festländische Heldensage in nordgermanischer und englischer Überlieferung - verlorene Heldensage. de Gruyter.
- Shaull, Erin M. (2017). "Ecgþeow, Brother of Ongenþeow, and the Problem of Beowulf's Swedishness". Neophilologus. 101 (2): 263–275. doi:10.1007/s11061-016-9508-2. S2CID 164608334.
- Shaw, Philip A. (2020). Names and Naming in 'Beowulf': Studies in Heroic Narrative Tradition. London, New York: Bloomsbury Academic. ISBN 978-1-3501-4576-4.
- Shippey, Tom (2010). ""Hrólfs saga kraka" and the Legend of Lejre". In Martin, Arnold; Finlay, Alison (eds.). Making History, Essays on the Fornaldarsögur. Viking Society for Northern Research, University College London. ISBN 978-0-903521-84-0.
- Simek, Rudolf (1993). Dictionary of Northern Mythology. Translated by Hall; Angela. D. S. Brewer. ISBN 0-85991-369-4.
- The Saga of King Heidrek the Wise (PDF). Translated by Tolkien, Christopher. 1960.
- Uecker, Heiko (1972). Germanische Heldensage. Stuttgart: Metzler. ISBN 3476101061.
- de Vries, Jan (1962). Altnordisches Etymologisches Worterbuch (2000 ed.). Brill. ISBN 90-04-05436-7.
- The Sagas of Ragnar Lodbrok. Translated by Waggoner, Ben. New Haven: Troth Publications. 2009.
- Sagas of Imagination. Translated by Waggoner, Ben. New Haven: Troth Publications. 2018. ISBN 9781941136171.
- Wessén, Elias (1927). "Eddadikterna om Helge Hundingsbane". Fornvännen.
