= Thing of all Swedes =

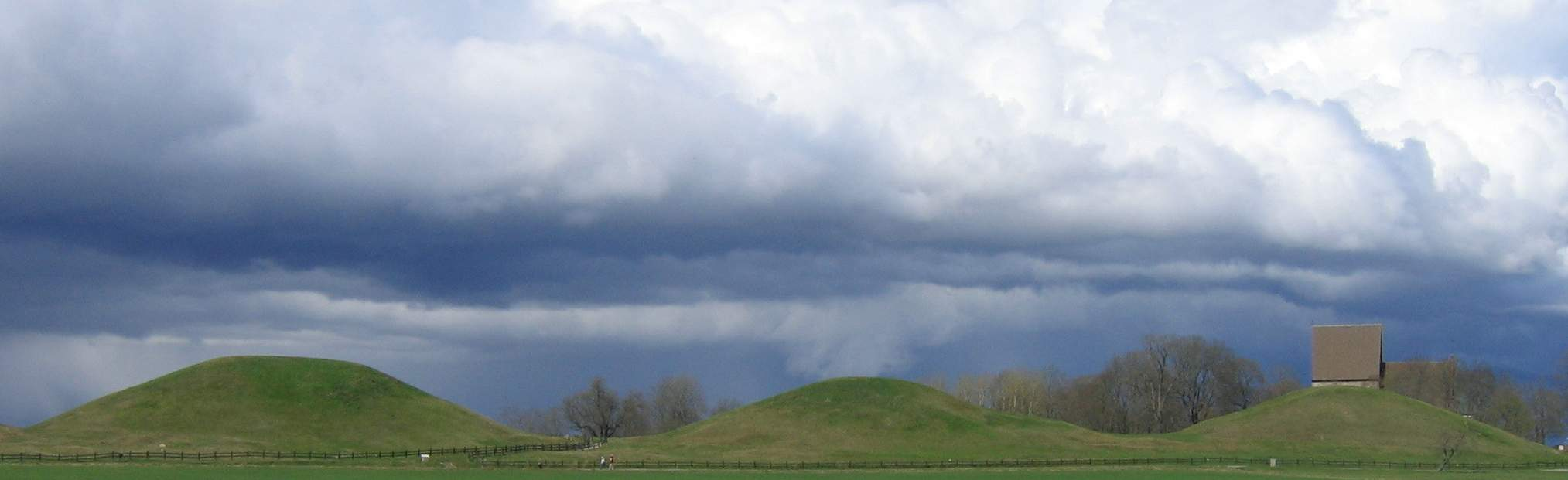
The assemblies were held at Gamla Uppsala.

The Thing of all Swedes (allra Svía þing, Þing allra Svía, Disaþing, or Kyndilþing) was the governing assembly held from pre-historic times to the Middle Ages at Gamla Uppsala, Sweden, occurring at the end of February or early March in conjunction with a great fair and a religious celebration called Dísablót. The Law of Uppland informs that it was at this assembly that the king proclaimed that the leidang would be summoned for warfare during the summer, and all the crews, rowers, commanders and ships were decided.

The name suggests that it replaced an older division where each of the folklands Tiundaland, Attundaland and Fjärdhundraland had their own things. All free men living in the realm and who were able to wield a weapon had the right to participate, and the assembly was led by the lawspeaker.

Icelandic historian Snorri Sturlusson, who was well-informed of Swedish matters and visited the country in 1219, explained in the Heimskringla (1225):

In Svithjod it was the old custom, as long as heathenism prevailed, that the chief sacrifice took place in Goe month at Upsala. Then sacrifice was offered for peace, and victory to the king; and thither came people from all parts of Svithjod. All the Things of the Swedes, also, were held there, and markets, and meetings for buying, which continued for a week: and after Christianity was introduced into Svithjod, the Things and fairs were held there as before. After Christianity had taken root in Svithjod, and the kings would no longer dwell in Upsala, the market-time was moved to Candlemas, and it has since continued so, and it lasts only three days. There is then the Swedish Thing also, and people from all quarters come there.

When the assembly was moved to Candlemas, it was renamed Kyndelsting (Old Swedish: Kyndilþing), but the name Dísaþing remained in use as the Disting for the great fair.

== See also ==
- Thing (assembly)
- Thing of all Geats, an equivalent assembly of the Geats that took place in Skara.
- Norse law
