= Lists of figures in Germanic heroic legend =

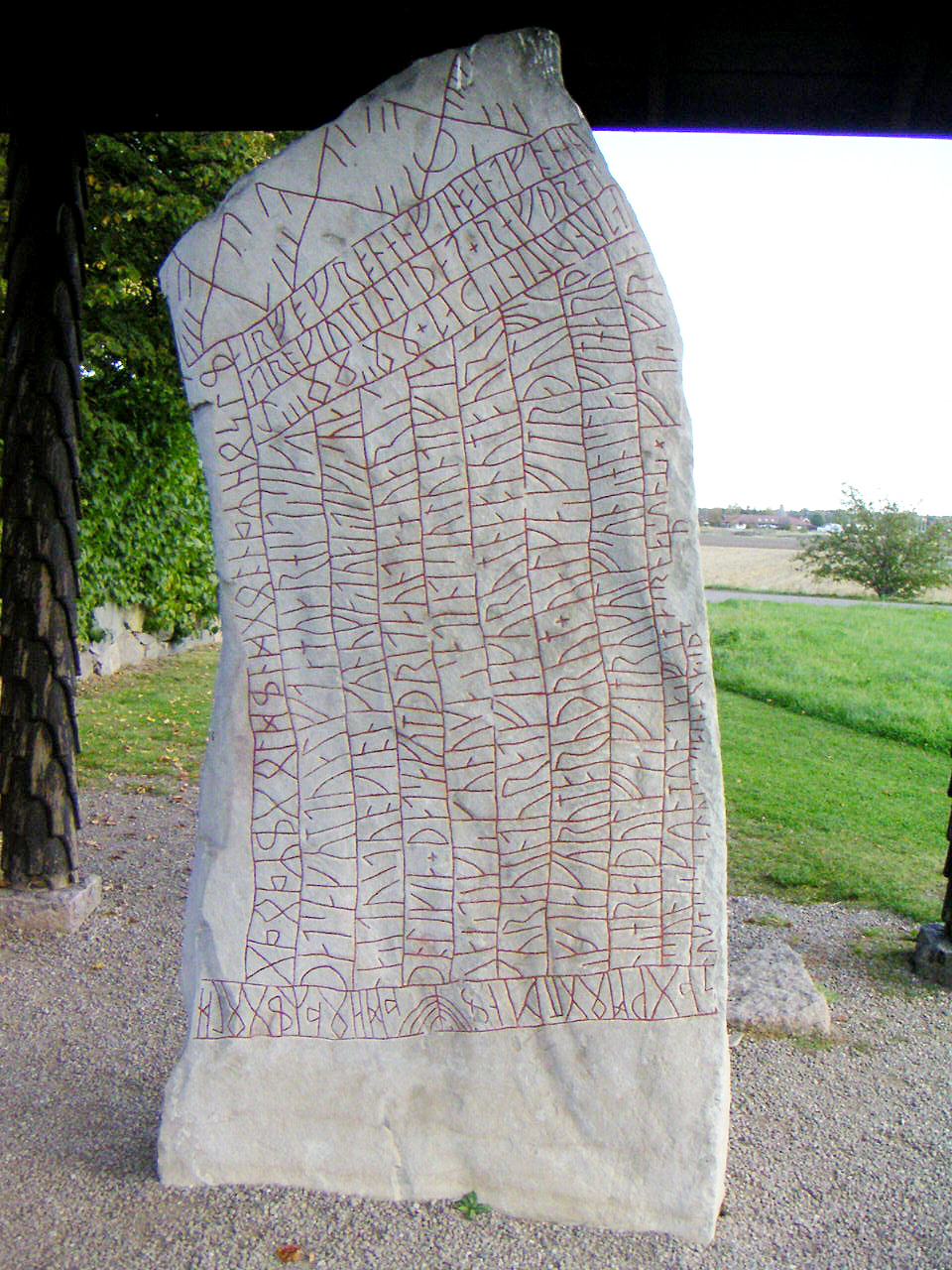
The 9th c. Rök runestone lists names of Germanic heroes and events, but the significance of most of them is nowadays lost.

The figures in the lists below are listed either by the name of their article on Wikipedia or, if there is no article, according to the name by which they are most commonly attested. A few figures widely known by an English, German and a Norse name will list both. As much as possible, names that vary greatly in different traditions indicate where the main entry is to be found.

Notes on the Þiðreks saga:

1. As names in the Þiðreks saga typically adapt a German name, only figures that are not attested outside of the Þiðreks saga are listed under that name, even if most information on the figure is from the Þiðreks saga.
2. Because the Þiðreks saga is based on German sources, it is counted as a German attestation.

Excluded from the list are:

1. figures who are only mentioned as a relative, or in a list, may not have been included.
2. figures who have been multiplicated in e.g. Gesta Danorum and Skjöldunga saga, such as the many Fróðis and Halfdans (corresponding to only one Froda and one Healfdene in the older Beowulf), may be treated in the same entry.
3. figures who only appear in a Danish chronicle, such as Gesta Danorum, or are only mentioned in legendary sagas that are not part of the Heroic sagas may not have been included.
4. figures from the genre of minstrel epic are generally not included unless they are commonly discussed in secondary sources dealing with heroic epic in medieval Germany.
5. gods and deities

Although this list excludes Germanic deities, it includes other entities stemming from Germanic folklore that appear in the legends (such as valkyries, dwarfs, giants, and jötnar).

== Lists of figures in Germanic heroic legend ==
- List of figures in Germanic heroic legend, A
- List of figures in Germanic heroic legend, B–C
- List of figures in Germanic heroic legend, D–E
- List of figures in Germanic heroic legend, F–G
- List of figures in Germanic heroic legend, H–He
- List of figures in Germanic heroic legend, Hi–Hy
- List of figures in Germanic heroic legend, I–O
- List of figures in Germanic heroic legend, P–S
- List of figures in Germanic heroic legend, T–Y

== Other lists ==
- List of Beowulf characters
- List of named animals and plants in Germanic heroic legend
- List of named weapons, armour and treasures in Germanic heroic legend
- List of people, clan, and place names in Germanic heroic legend
