= Law of Uppland =

13th-century Swedish law

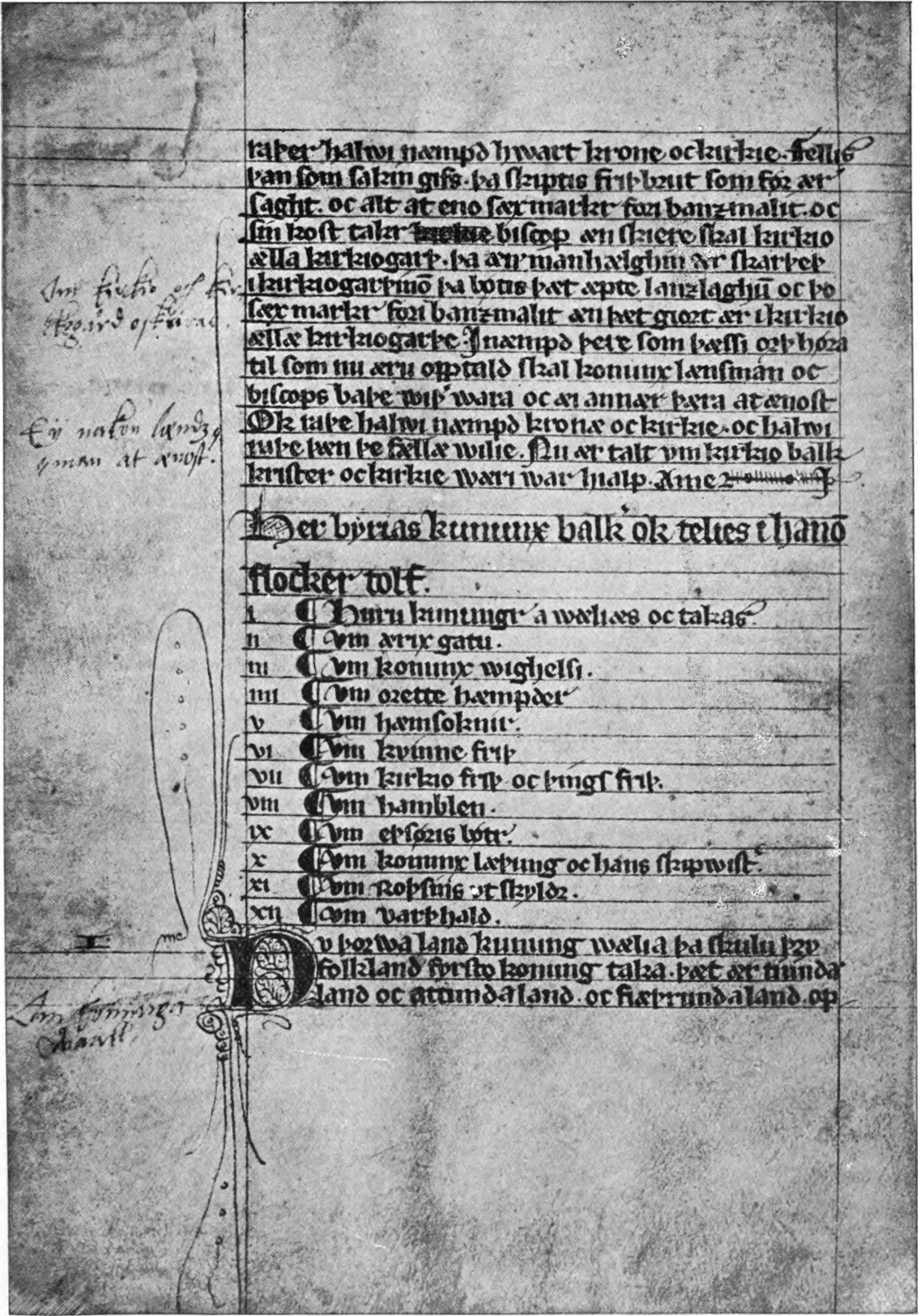

The Things of the three Folklands
- Long title: Codex iuris Uplandici
- Territorial extent: Uppland, Gästrikland
- Enacted by: The Things of the three Folklands
- Enacted: 1295
- Royal assent: 2 January 1296
- Status: Void

The Law of Uppland (Swedish: Upplandslagen; Latin: Codex iuris Uplandici) was the law that applied in Uppland, Sweden, from 1296 to the beginning of the 1350s.

It was drafted by a Royal commission, enacted at the three Folkland Things, and given Royal assent in 1296. The Law of Uppland became the law of the land, not only for the province of Uppland it created, containing the three Folklands and Roden, but also for Gästrikland. The law contained eight law codes: The Church, King's, Heritance, Freeman's, Land, Merchant's, Neighborhood, and Thing codes. Courts were held in each Hundred and each Folkland. There were no public prosecutors, and no material difference between criminal and civil cases existed. Suits in law would be initiated by the parties. Legal proceedings were of three kinds: trial by eyewitnesses, trial by compurgation and trial by jury.

== Background ==
In early medieval Sweden, each Land (province) was judicially autonomous with its own legal system, laws and justice (leges terrae). The law originally only existed in a spoken form, recited at the Thing by the Lawspeaker. From the end of the 13th century, the oral laws began on private initiative to be recorded in the form of unofficial law texts (Rechtsbücher). From the Law of Uppland, however, the law codes were formally enacted.

== Creation ==
The area of Uppland, which did not exist before the enactment of the Law of Uppland, contained the three Folklands of Tiundaland, Attundaland, and Fjärdhundraland. The Lawspeaker of Tiundaland, Birger Persson (the father of Saint Bridget) complained to King Birger Magnusson, that the law for the three Folklands were scattered in several different law texts, some of them obscure and sometimes very difficult to comply with. Hence the King appointed Birger chairman of a Royal commission that would draft a new law; removing some provisions, adding some, and merging the old laws of the three folklands into one.

According to the preamble of the Law, in addition to Birger, the commission came to consist of from Tiundaland, the Dean of Uppsala Master Andreas And (Birger's cousin), the Knights Herr Röd Keldorsson and Herr Bengt Bosson, Ulf Lagmansson, Hagbard of Söderby, Anders of Forkarby and Torsten of Sandbro; from Attundaland the Knight Herr Filip Röde of Rundby, Håkan Lawspeaker, Eskil the Cross-eyed, Sigurd Judge and Jon Gåsabog; from Fjärdhundraland Ulv of Önsta, Götrik and Ulvheden, Judges. The commission made a draft that was subsequently enacted by the Things of the three Folklands, and finally given Royal assent eight days after Saint Stephen's Day (January 2), 1296.

== Jurisdiction ==
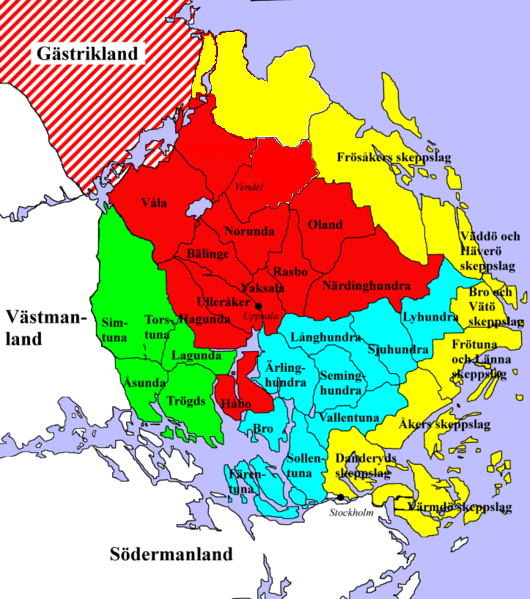
The jurisdiction of the Law of Uppland. Tiundaland Attundaland Roden Fjärdhundraland

The Law of Uppland became the law of the land, not only for the province of Uppland it created, containing the three Folklands and Roden, but also for Gästrikland. Since the new law of the whole realm, the Magnus Erikssons landslag of 1350, lacked a church code due to opposition from the Church, the church codes of the several provincial laws remained in force even after 1350. Gradually the church code of the Law of Uppland became valid for the whole kingdom, remaining in force until it was partly replaced by the Church Act of 1686 and finally by stipulations in the Civil Code of 1734.

== Formal content ==
The Church code governed the relationship between the Church, the Bishop, the Priest, the Parish, and the People, including marriage, baptism, and tithe. The King's code covered the election of Kings, and the relationship between the King and the People. It contained provisions concerning the People's obligation to the King, such as leidang, watch and ward, and taxes, as well as the King's obligation to uphold the Peace. The Heritance code governed inheritance and bequests; the Freeman's code was the nearest equivalent of a criminal code, aimed at protecting the Freemen from abuse. The Land code included clauses about birthright to land, property owned in common, and maintenance of the elderly. The Merchant code regulated purchase of gold, women's right of purchase, hospitality and foraging, as well as a prohibition against selling Christians. The Neighborhood code regulated division of land, metes and bounds, commons, new land, mills, dams and bridges, hunting, fishing, cattle and more. The Thing code included provisions about trials and lawsuits, as well as of the Law of the land and of the law of Roden. Eighteen amendments were later added to the law, including stipulations about burial fees, outlawry, deeding of land, and homicide by unknown perpetrators.

== Courts and procedures ==
A Thing could be held as often as every week in each hundred, or in each Skiplagh (ship's district) in Roden. The judgments were given by the judge, not the assembly. There would be two judges for each thing, although only one served at the time. The judges were elected by a jury of twelve men appointed by the King's Lensmann, and thereafter commissioned by the King. Each Folkland also had a thing, under the Lawspeaker of Uppland. A common landsting for all of Uppland did not exist. Appeals from the Hundred thing would go to the Lawspeaker; from the Lawspeaker to the King.

There were no public prosecutors, and no material difference between criminal and civil cases existed. Suits in law would be initiated by the parties. A perpetrator caught in flagrante delicto would be taken as a prisoner to the Thing by the plaintiff; in other cases the plaintiff would serve a summons on the defendant. In cases of acts that could be atoned for by mulcts, the defendant could also initiate action by offering such at the Thing.

Legal proceedings were of three kinds: trial by eyewitnesses, trial by compurgation and trial by jury. If the plaintiff could bring, in most cases, six sworn free and freeborn men as eyewitnesses, the case was closed, and now further action from the defendant would be allowed; he was convicted. But if the plaintiff could not produce enough sworn witnesses, the defendant had the right to establish his nonliability by taking an oath and having, normally, eighteen men swear that they believed him. If the required number of men took the oath, he was acquitted, otherwise he was convicted. The use of jury trials is not guided by any clear legal principles, but through individual provisions in various parts of the law. A new jury (næfnd) would be selected for each new case. In trials concerning the King's Peace, the jurors had to be approved by both parties. In some other cases half the jury was selected by each party. The jurors took an oath on their verdict; if they refused to give a verdict, they were fined.

== Editions ==
The Law of Uppland is preserved in five complete handwritten copies. The assent is preserved in both a Swedish and a Latin form. A printed version was published in 1607 by Johannes Bureus. The first scholarly edition was published in 1834. A translation to modern Swedish was published in 1933.
