= Roslagen =

Coastal areas of Uppland province in Sweden

Coordinates: 59.52488°N 18.40820°E

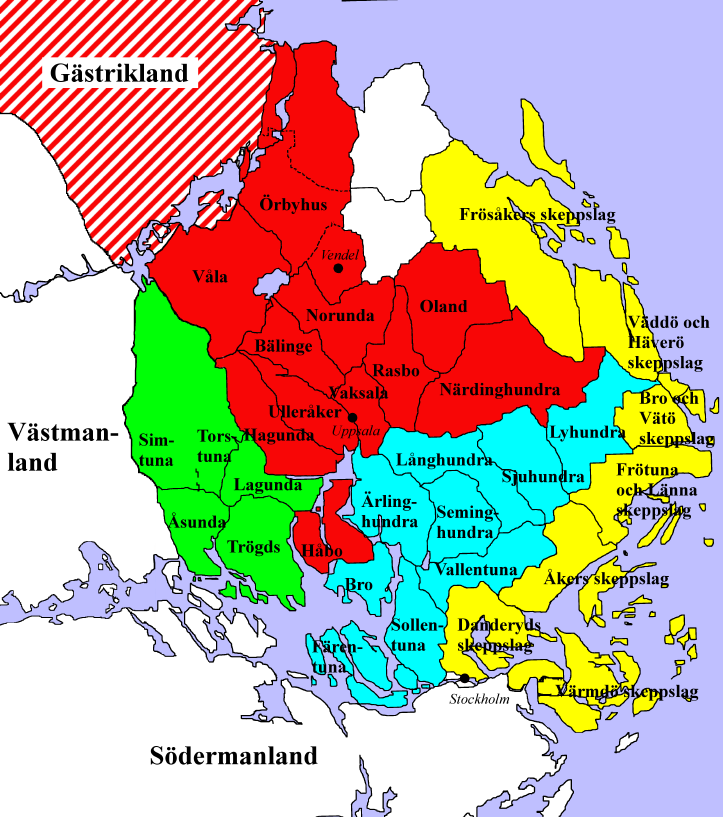
Folklands in Svitjod (Uppland and Gästrikland) Tiunda Attunda Roden Fjärdhundra The coastline has changed considerably in the last millennium due to post-glacial rebound. Originally there was a sea bay coming in from the north all the way into Uppsala. Roslagen is the modern name for the area which roughly corresponds to what was called Roden in the Middle Ages.

Roslagen is a coastal area in eastern Uppland in Sweden. It constitutes the northern part of the Stockholm archipelago and extends north along the coast. The old designation for the area was Roden.

In the Viking Age, Roden was divided into skeppslag ("ship districts"), each responsible for supplying ships and crews when the king issued a call to the leidang, the conscript navy system. Unlike the inland hundreds, Roden lay outside the regular division of the Uppland folklands. It mainly covered the coastal areas of Tiundaland and Attundaland, sometimes reaching into Gästrikland, and in some sources even included islands further south such as Lidingö and Värmdö.

Over time, especially from the 1500s onward, the term Roslagen came to be used more generally for the entire Uppland coast and even some inland areas.

A person from Roslagen is called a Rospigg, a modernized form of rosbyggiar ("inhabitant of Roden"). The area also gives its name to the endangered domesticated Roslag sheep, which originated from the area centuries ago.

== Etymology ==
The name Roslagen is first attested in 1493 as Rodzlagen. Before that, the area was known as Roden (from Old Swedish roðer, "rowing"), which referred to the coastal districts organized for naval defense. The second element -lagen comes from Old Swedish lag, meaning a group or team acting together, the same word that appears in skeppslag ("ship district").

The name Roden itself may be attested already in the 11th century on two Uppland runestones (inscribed i roþ and i ruþi). It was called roþi by Northmen in the 11th century that wrote down the words on the Uppland Runic Inscription 11. In written medieval sources it appears in the 14th century (Rodhinum 1316, Rodhin 1344). Roden was later contracted to Ron (attested in 1545 and 1608) before it disappeared from common usage, and Roslagen became the established name.

== Ruotsi, Rus' and Russia ==
Etymologically, Roslagen or Roden is the source of the Finnish and Estonian names for Sweden: Ruotsi and Rootsi.

Swedes from the Roslagen area also gave their name to the Rus' people and Russia (see Names of Rus', Russia and Ruthenia). The scholarly consensus is that the Rus' people originated in what is currently coastal eastern Sweden around the eighth century and that their name has the same origin as Roslagen. According to the prevalent theory, the name Rus', like the Proto-Finnic name for Sweden (*roocci). is derived from an Old Norse term for "the men who row" (rods-) as rowing was the main method of navigating the rivers of Eastern Europe, and that it could be linked to the Swedish coastal area of Roslagen. The name Rus' would then have the same origin as the Finnish and Estonian names for Sweden.

== Communications ==
The region is served by the Roslagsbanan, a narrow-gauge railway network from Stockholm, going as far north as Kårsta. The motorway E18 goes through Roslagen between Kapellskär and Stockholm.

== Nature ==
The hiking trail Roslagsleden crosses the region starting in Danderyd and ending in Grisslehamn.

== See also ==
- Attundaland
- Fjärdhundraland
- Fälö by
- Tiundaland
- Stones of Mora
- Swedes (Germanic tribe)
- Norrtälje
