= Svitjod =

Old Norse name for Sweden

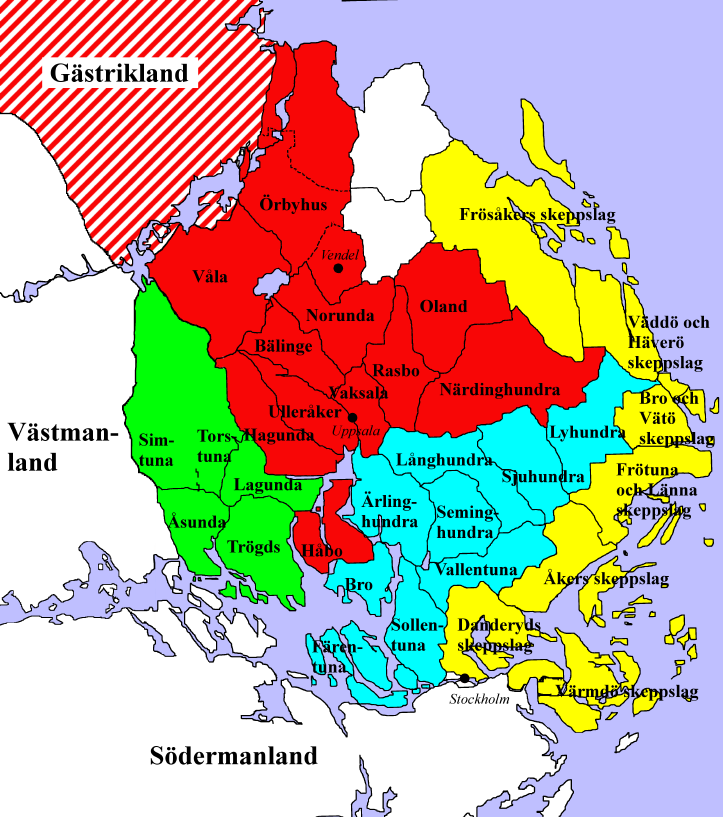
Folklands in Svitjod (in present-day Uppland) red = Tiunda cyan = Attunda yellow = Roden green = Fjärdhundra The coast line has changed considerably in the last millennium due to Post-glacial rebound. Originally there was a sea bay coming in from the north all the way into Uppsala.

Svitjod (also spelled Svithiod; Old Norse: Svíþjóð, Old Swedish: Svethiudh) was an early name for both the people known as the Svear and the land they inhabited. In medieval times, the name usually referred to their central territory in what is now Uppland in eastern Sweden. The name is composed of the ethnonym Svear and the word *thiudh, meaning "people".

Over time, it was also used more broadly as a poetic or historical name for the whole Swedish kingdom. In Norse literature, Svitjod could also refer to a vast eastern region, including parts of what is now Russia, known as "Great Svitjod" (see Garðaríki).

== Geographic scope ==
In the narrower sense, Svitjod referred specifically to the core territory of the Svear in the Mälaren Valley, primarily in what is now Uppland, and by extension parts of Södermanland and Västmanland. According to Snorri Sturluson, Svíþjóð sjálfri ("Svitjod proper") was the heartland of the Svear, distinct from the wider realm known as Svíaveldi ("the realm of the Svear"), which encompassed surrounding regions including parts of Götaland, Gotland, and Öland.

This core region was not a single unified province but was divided into three major territorial and administrative units known as folklands: Tiundaland, Attundaland, and Fjädrundaland. These divisions are well attested in medieval law codes and administrative records and were closely linked to the early political and military organization of the kingdom of the Svear.

Tiundaland, meaning "land of ten hundreds", was the most prominent folkland. It contained Uppsala, which served as the religious, political, and later ecclesiastical center of the Svear. The region was associated with royal estates (Uppsala öd) and, in the Christian period, with the Archdiocese of Uppsala. Tiundaland also had a coastal district known as Tiundalands roden, which facilitated naval mobilization.

Attundaland, meaning "land of eight hundreds", was located southeast of Tiundaland. It had its own coastal district, Attundalands roden, and served both administrative and military functions.

Fjädrundaland, meaning "land of four hundreds" (using an archaic form of the numeral four, fjädrund-), was the smallest of the three and located southwest of Uppsala. Though less central politically, it was still an integral part of the Svear domain.

The names of the folklands reflect a system of military-administrative subdivisions called hundare (from Old Swedish hund, meaning "hundred"), comparable to the hundreds of Anglo-Saxon England. Each hundred was likely responsible for supplying approximately 100 armed men, especially for naval expeditions organized under the ledung system. This system of hundreds was unique to the Mälaren region and was not used in Götaland or Norrland, where other divisions such as härad and skeppslag were used instead.

Together with the coastal district of Roden (from Old Norse roðr, meaning "rowing"), the three folklands constituted the territory that was later formalized as Uppland. The term Uppland became common only after the adoption of the Upplandslagen (Law of Uppland) in 1296. Until then, the folklands functioned as the primary regional and cultural units of the Svear.

By the 12th century, Södermanland and Västmanland began to be considered a part of Svitjod.

== Legacy and linguistic influence ==
Most modern European names for Sweden, such as Sweden (English), Schweden (German), Suède (French), and Svezia (Italian), derive not from the native term Svearike, but from Svitjod. Medieval papal correspondence with Swedish kings in the 11th and 12th centuries uses a variety of royal titles, reflecting how Swedish rulers wished to be understood by foreign audiences. Regardless, the consistent appearance of the name Svitjod and its variants in international contexts suggests it was the most widely recognized name for the Swedish realm outside of Scandinavia during the Middle Ages.

Domestically, however, a different tradition developed. The native term Svíaríki ("realm of the Svear") evolved into Sverike and ultimately Sverige by the 14th century, influenced either by natural sound shifts or Danish linguistic patterns. The earliest documented form appears in a charter from Kalmar in 1384, spelled Swerighe. The use of the suffix -rike (meaning "realm" or "kingdom") in the name Sverige likely served a political purpose. According to historian Dick Harrison, the term emphasized the independence and sovereignty of the Swedish political order, particularly within the kingdom itself. This need for an internally affirming designation was not as relevant in foreign contexts where older, more geographic or ethnographic terms like Svitjod or its derivatives persisted.

== See also ==
- Svealand
- Consolidation of Sweden
