= Stones of Mora =

Historic location in Knivsta, Sweden

Coordinates: 59°47′52″N 17°46′51″E

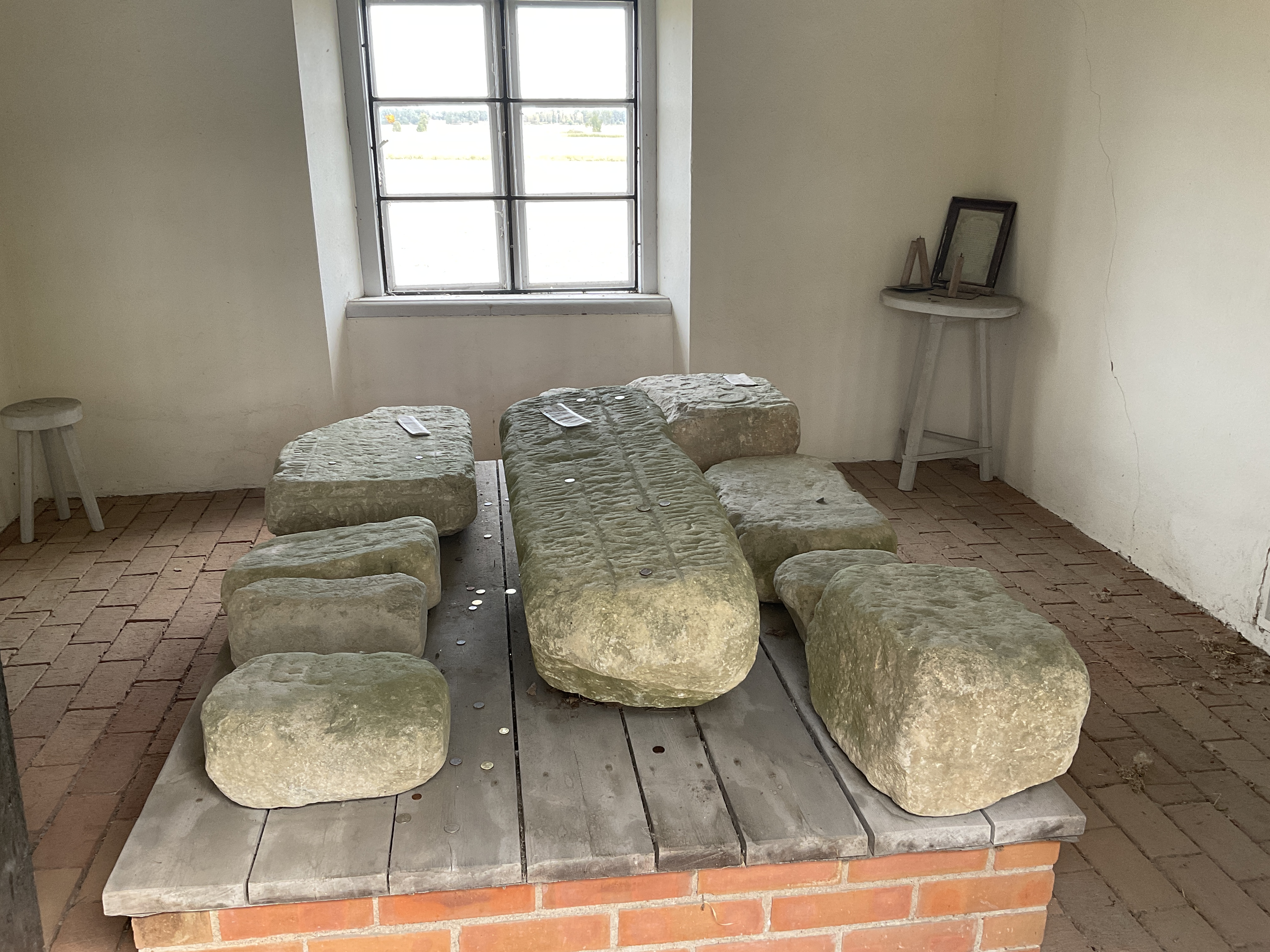
Fragments of commemorative stones from the monument

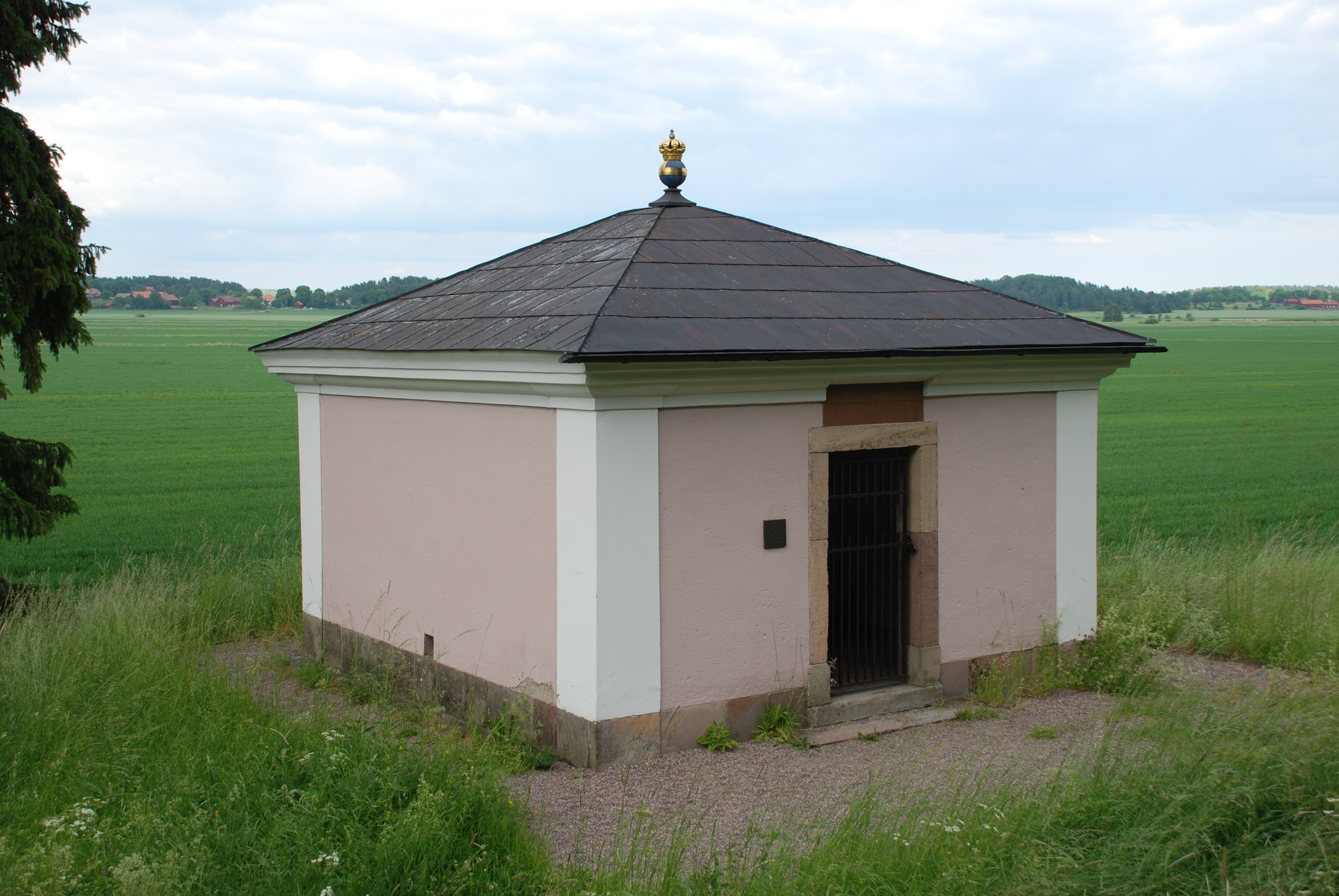
The building which contains the remaining fragments

The Stones of Mora (Swedish: Mora stenar) is a historic location in Knivsta, Sweden. Several Medieval kings of Sweden were proclaimed at the assembly of Mora near modern Uppsala. It was moved in the 15th century and was considered to have been lost. However, there are a number of stones of record in a small building in the vicinity of the former assembly site.

== Origin of name ==
The Stones of Mora were originally named in singular as Mora sten referring to a stone on which the newly elected king stood after his election. With later monuments in stone commemorating different elections, the name changed to the plural form.

== Location ==
Mora Meadow (Mora äng) is located in Lagga parish in Knivsta Municipality about 10 km south-east of Uppsala. The location, which is not associated with Mora town, is at equal distance from the Things of the old folklands Attundaland and Tiundaland. This was the location of Mora Thing, where the Swedish kings were elected.

== History ==
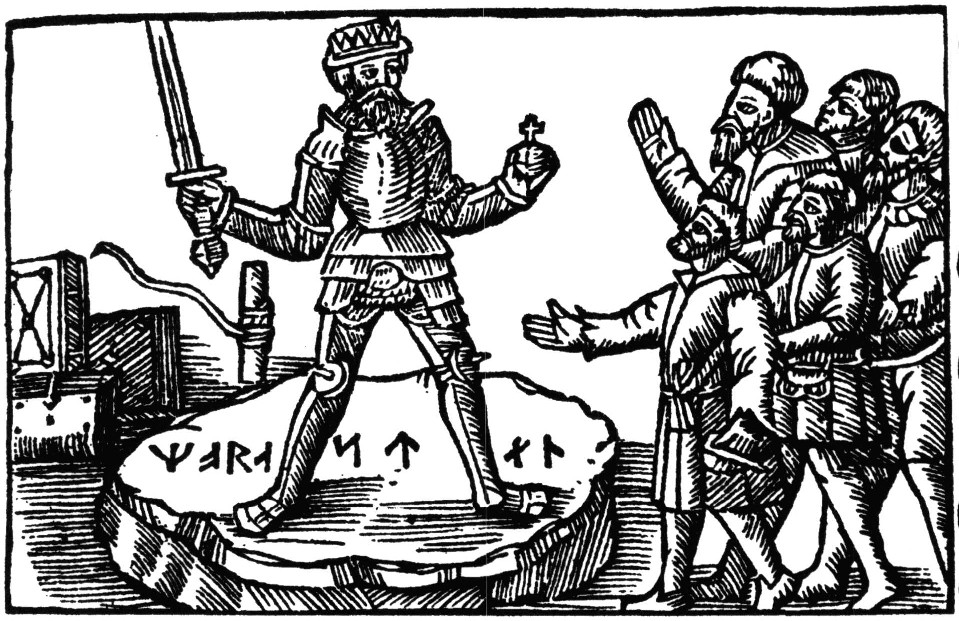
Woodcut showing election of the king.

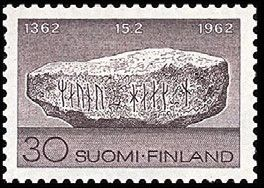
Finnish commemorative stamp from 1962 featuring Stones of Mora

The law of Uppland and Södermanland states: The three folklands, that is Tiundaland, Attundaland and Fjärdhundraland, shall first elect king. Then the election will be sanctioned by the lawspeaker of Uppland and then by all his subordinate lawspeakers in the rest of the kingdom, one by one.

The Westrogothic law reminded the Geats that they had to accept this election: Sveær egho konung at taka ok sva vrækæ meaning Swedes have the right of choosing and deposing the king.

The detail that the Swedes were not only entitled to elect their king, but that they also had the right to depose him was institutionalized a long time before, as attested by Snorri Sturlason's (died 1241) accounts of Swedish history (the speech of Torgny the Lawspeaker, and the deaths of Domalde, Egil, Aun, and Jorund in the Heimskringla). The location was on the border of a wetland and according to Snorri, five kings had been drowned in this wetland, when the people had been displeased.

The newly elected king also had to go on a traditional journey around Sweden (Eriksgata), including the Geatish provinces. It was thus a sort of federation where the king started with his election at Mora Thing and then travelled throughout the kingdom to have the election confirmed by the local assemblies. Beginning in 1362 also representatives from Finland took part in the election.

The Stone of Mora and many stones which flanked it with inscriptions commemorating the elections of earlier kings, were probably destroyed in 1515 during a civil war. Kings Gustav Vasa and John III are said to have tried to reconstruct the Stones of Mora without success.

The building where the fragments are now contained was constructed by local military officer Carl Wijnbladh (1705- 1768).

== Documented elections ==
1. Magnus III of Sweden was elected at the Stones of Mora in 1275.
2. Magnus IV of Sweden was elected at the stones on July 8, 1319
3. Albert was crowned here on February 18, 1364
4. Christian I of Denmark, Norway and Sweden was the last to be elected at Mora in 1457

== Knivsta coat of arms ==
The Knivsta Municipality coat of arms.

In 2002, in anticipation of Knivsta Municipality (previously part of Uppsala Municipality since 1971) regaining its status of a municipality of its own in 2003, the Swedish state herald designed and registered a coat of arms for Knivsta based on the stone of Mora motif: an open crown over a heraldic trimount.

== See also ==
- Coronation Stone
- Germanic king
- Lia Fáil
- List of individual rocks
- Prince's Stone
- Stone of Scone

== Other sources ==
- Larsson, Mats G. (2013) Mora sten och Mora ting (Fornvännen. Stockholm)
- Mora sten och Mora stenar: en vägledning till ett märkligt nationalmonument(Stockholm: Riksantikvarieämbetet. 1993) ISBN 91-7192-882-0

== Related reading ==
- Stefan Brink The creation of a Scandinavian provincial law: how was it done (Historical Research, Volume 86, Issue 233, August 2013, Pages 432–442)
