= Heimir =

Figure from Germanic heroic legend

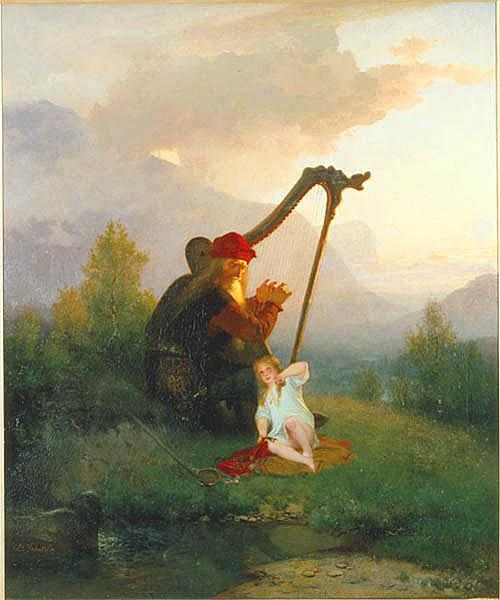
"King Heimer and Aslög" (1856) by August Malmström.

Heimir (Old Norse) was a Germanic figure in Germanic heroic legend who appears in Grípisspá, Helreið Brynhildar and the Völsunga saga. He is the king of Hlymdalir, the maternal uncle of Brynhildr and foster-father, or spouse, of Brynhildr's sister Bekkhildr. He is also the foster-father of Aslaug, Brynhildr's daughter with Sigurd (Sigfried). As the Burgundians wanted to kill the little child, he kept her hidden in a harp and wandered as a minstrel until he arrived in Spangereid in Norway, where he was murdered in his sleep by Áki and Grima, who believed that Heimir kept valuables in the harp.
