= Roslagsleden =

Hiking trail in Sweden

Coordinates: 59°24′42″N 18°01′52″E

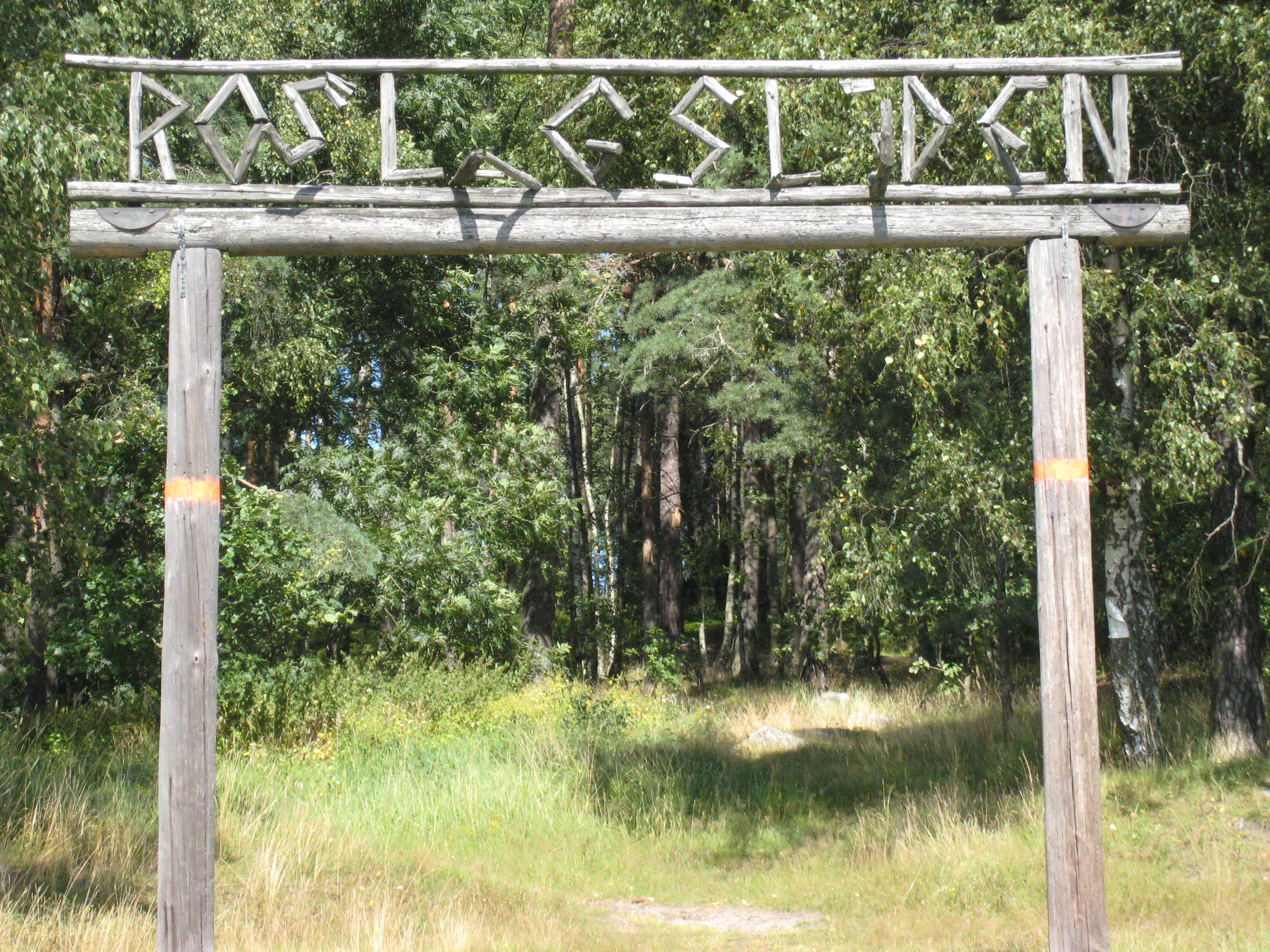
The start of Roslagsleden

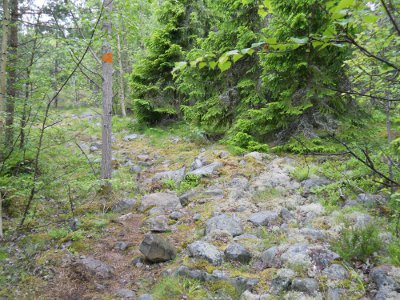
The trail is clearly marked with orange paint on trees and other objects.

Roslagsleden (Roslags Trail) is a 190 km long hiking trail in Stockholm County, Sweden.

Roslagsleden is part of the European route E6 which goes from Kilpisjärvi in the north to Greece in the south. The trail is split up in 11 sections that range from 9 to 22 km each. There are several campsites and lodging is available throughout the trail. Roslagsleden starts in Danderyd and finishes in Grisslehamn, and also passes through the town of Norrtälje. Trees by the trail are marked with an orange color.
