= Tiundaland =

Historic region in Sweden

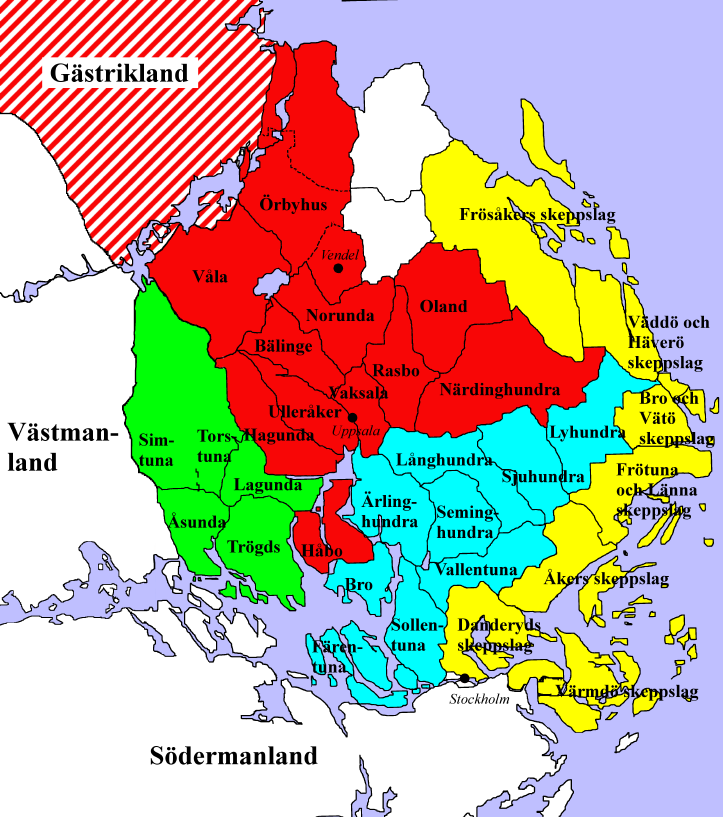
Folklands in Svitjod (Uppland/Gästrikland) red = Tiunda cyan = Attunda yellow = Roden green = Fjärdhundra The coast line has changed considerably in the last millennium due to Post-glacial rebound. Originally there was a sea bay coming in from the north all the way into Uppsala

Tiundaland is a historic region, Folkland, and since 1296 part of the modern province of Uppland in Sweden. It originally meant the land of the ten hundreds and referred to its duty of providing 1000 men and 40 ships for the Swedish king's leidang.

A list from 1314 defines Tiundaland as Bälinge Hundred, Gästrikland, Håbo Hundred, Hagunda Hundred, Norunda Hundred, Närding Hundred, Oland Hundred, Rasbo Hundred, Ulleråker Hundred and Vaksala Hundred.

During the Viking Age it probably extended from the coast of the Baltic Sea by Norrtälje to the bay which today is the lake Mälaren. A very strategic position.

According to Snorri Sturluson in the Heimskringla it was the location of Uppsala and the Thing of all Swedes, where every year there were great blóts which were attended by many kings. He relates that Tiundaland was the richest and most fertile region of Sweden where was the seat of the Swedish kings at Uppsala, the Swedish Archbishopric and from which Uppsala öd had taken its name. All the Swedish lawspeakers were subordinate to the one of Tiundaland.

The third portion of Svithjod proper is called Tiundaland; the fourth Attundaland; the fifth Sialand (Roslagen), and what belongs to it lies eastward along the coast. Tiundaland is the best and most inhabited part of Svithjod, under which the other kingdoms stand. There Upsala is situated, the seat of the king and archbishop; and from it Upsala-audr (Uppsala öd), or the domain of the Swedish kings, takes its name. Each of these divisions of the country has its Lag-thing, and Its own laws in many parts. Over each is a lagman [lawspeaker], who rules principally in affairs of the bondes [yeomen]: for that becomes law which he, by his speech, determines them to make law: and if king, earl, or bishop goes through the country, and holds a Thing with the bondes, the lagmen [law speakers] reply on account of the bondes, and they all follow their lagmen; so that even the most powerful men scarcely dare to come to their Al-thing without regarding the bondes' and lagmen's law. And in all matters in which the laws differ from each other, Upsala-law is the directing law; and the other lagmen are under the lagman who dwells in Tiundaland.

== See also ==
- Attundaland
- Fjärdhundraland
- Roslagen
- Stone of Mora
- Suiones
