= Agnafit =

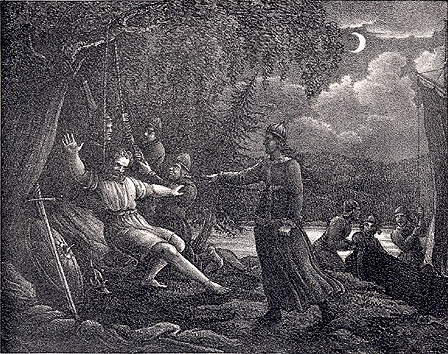
Agne being hanged by his wife Skjalf at Agnafit

Agnafit (Old Norse: [ˈɑɣnɑˌfit]) or Agnefit was the name of a location where Lake Mälaren met the Baltic Sea. In the 14th century, an addition to the Historia Norwegiae described Agnafit as being where Stockholm had been founded. Some say that it was a fishing village located on the island Stadsholmen, before Stockholm was founded in 1252.

It is moreover mentioned by Snorri Sturluson in the Heimskringla (Ynglinga saga) as the location where the Swedish king Agne was hanged by his captive bride Skjalf in his golden torc. She had been captured by Agne in Finland, and after Agne's execution she escaped with her thralls. Later in the Heimskringla (the Saga of Olaf Haraldsson), Snorri writes that king Olaf Haraldsson was captured by the Swedes in Mälaren and had to dig a channel at Agnafit to escape into the Baltic Sea.

Snorri attributes the name to king Agne and fit ("wet meadow"), but toponymists have suggested that Agne- can be derived from the practice of baiting fishing tools at the location.

The location is also mentioned in Ásmundar saga kappabana and in Orvar-Odd's saga. In the latter saga, it is mentioned in the Swedish hero Hjalmar's deathsong. He sang that he would never more see his beloved princess whom he bid farewell at Agnafit:

| Leiddi mik en hvíta hilmis dóttir á Agnafit útanverða ; [???eða: Hvarfk frá hvítri hlaðs beðgunni á Agnafit útanverðri ;] saga mun sannask, er sagði mér, at aptr koma eigi myndak. | She led me out, the lord's daughter, to Agnafit on the ocean side; [............] all too true what she told me then, that never after would I be back.(Tunstall's translation) |

When Orvar-Odd returned to Uppsala, the princess committed suicide and was buried with Hjalmar in the same barrow.

== Sources ==
- Nationalencyklopedin
- A Swedish language article in Dagens Nyheter
- Heimskringla
- Orvar-Odd's saga
