= Agne =

Mythological king of Sweden

Agne (Old Norse: Agni Skjálfarbóndi) was a semi-legendary king of Sweden, of the House of Yngling.

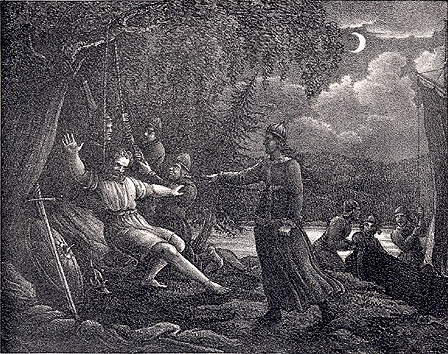
Agne being hanged by his wife Skjalf. Artwork by Hugo Hamilton, 1830

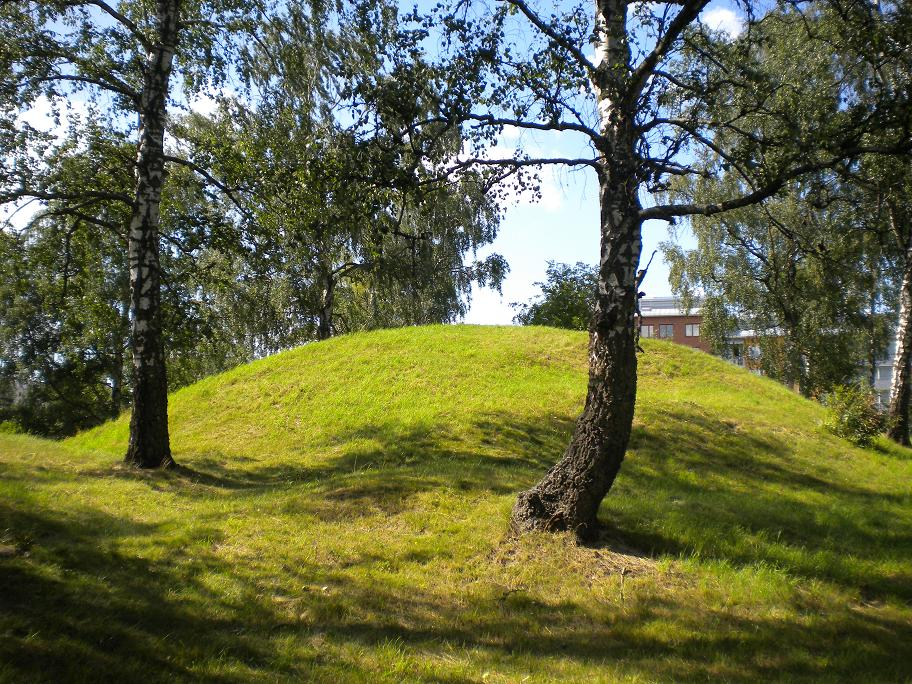
King Agni's Barrow just southeast of Sollentuna railway station in Sweden.

Snorri Sturluson relates that he was the son of Dag the Wise, and he was mighty and famous. He was also skilled in many ways.

One summer, he went to Finland with his army where he pillaged. The Finns gathered a vast host under a chief named Frosti.

A great battle ensued which Agne won and many Finns were killed together with Frosti. Agne then subdued all of Finland with his army, and captured not only great booty but also Frosti's daughter Skjalf and her kinsman Logi.

Agne returned to Sweden and they arrived at Stocksund (Stockholm) where they put up their tent on the side of the river where it is flat. Agne had a torc which is said to have belonged to his alleged great-great-great-grandfather Visbur. Agne married Skjalf.

Skjalf asked Agne to honour her dead father Frosti with a great feast, which he granted. He invited a great many guests, who gladly arrived to visit the now even more famous Swedish king. They had a drinking competition in which Agne became very drunk. Skjalf saw her opportunity and asked Agne to take care of Visbur's torc, which was around his neck. Agne bound it fast around his neck before he went to sleep. The king's tent was next to the woods and was under the branches of a tall tree for shade. When Agne was fast asleep, Skjalf took a rope which she attached to the torc. Then she had her men remove the tent, and she threw the rope over a bough. Then she told her men to pull the rope and they hanged Agne, avenging Skjalf's father. Skjalf and her men ran to the ships and escaped to Finland.

Agne was buried at the place, now called Agnafit, which is east of the Tauren (the Old Norse name for Södertörn) and west of Stocksund.

Þat tel ek undr, ef Agna her Skalfar ráð at sköpum þóttu, þar gœðing með gullmeni Loga dís at lopti hóf svalan hest Signýjar vers.	How do ye like the high-souled maid, Who, with the grim Fate-goddess' aid, Avenged her sire? – made Swithiod's king Through air in golden halter swing? How do ye like her, Agne's men? Think ye that any chief again Will court the fate your chief befell, To ride on wooden horse to hell?.

Ynglingatal then gives Alrekr and Eiríkr as Agne's successors.

The Historia Norwegiæ presents a Latin summary of Ynglingatal, older than Snorri's quotation:

Qui [Dagr] genuit Alrik; hunc frater suus Erikr freno percussit ad mortem. Alricr autem genuit Hogna; istum uxor sua juxta locum Agnafit, qui nunc Stokholmr dicitur, propriis manibus interfecit suspendendo ad arborem cum catena aurea. Cujus filius Ingialdr [...]

This man [Dag] engendered Alrek, who was beaten to death with a bridle by his brother, Eirik. Alrek was father to Agne, whose wife dispatched him with her own hands by hanging him on a tree with a golden chain near a place called Agnafit. His son, Ingjald, [...]

Agne is incorrectly called Hogne. Unlike Ynglingatal, Historia Norwegiæ does not give Dagr as Agne's predecessor, but Alrekr. Instead Alrekr is Agne's predecessor and Agne is succeeded by Yngvi (incorrectly called Ingialdr). The even earlier source Íslendingabók cites the line of descent in Ynglingatal and it gives the same line of succession as Historia Norwegiæ: xii Alrekr. xiii Agni. xiiii Yngvi.

The location indicated by Snorri Sturluson as the place of Agne's death has a barrow called Kung Agnes hög (King Agne's barrow) in Lillhersby, Sollentuna. The barrow was excavated by Oxenstierna and dated to c. 400. Moreover, this barrow may be proof that there is somewhat of a historical core to King Agne's story as told in the sagas.

== Primary sources ==
- Ynglingatal
- Ynglinga saga (part of the Heimskringla)
- Historia Norwegiae

== Secondary sources ==
Nerman, B. Det svenska rikets uppkomst. Stockholm, 1925.

Agne House of Yngling
Preceded by Dag the Wise	Legendary king of Sweden	Succeeded by Alrek and Eirík
