= Fjärdhundraland =

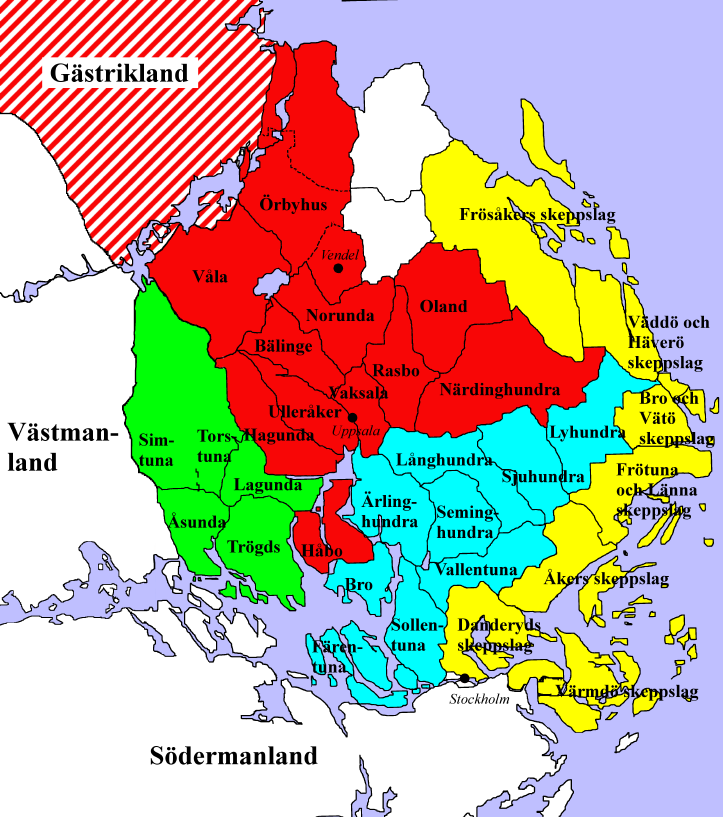
Folklands in Svitjod (Uppland/Gästrikland) red = Tiunda cyan = Attunda yellow = Roden green = Fjärdhundra The coast line has changed considerably in the last millennium due to Post-glacial rebound. Originally there was a sea bay coming in from the north all the way into Uppsala

Fjärdhundraland or the land of the four hundreds is, since 1296, a part of the province of Uppland in Sweden. Its name refers to its role of providing 400 men and 16 ships for the leidang of the Swedish king at Uppsala.

Snorri Sturluson relates that Tiundaland was the richest and most fertile region of Sweden which was the seat of the Swedish kings at Uppsala, the Swedish Archbishopric and from which Uppsala öd had taken its name. All the Swedish lawspeakers were subordinate to the one of Tiundaland.

== See also ==
- Folkland (Swedish provinces)
- Attundaland
- Roslagen
- Stone of Mora
- Suiones
