= Attundaland =

Swedish region

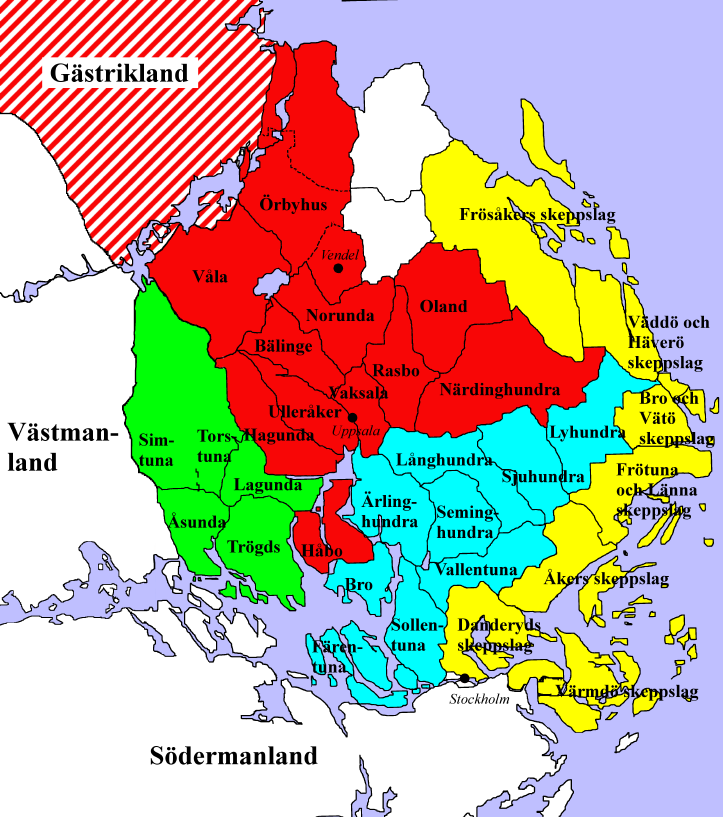
Folklands in Svitjod (Uppland/Gästrikland) red = Tiunda cyan = Attunda yellow = Roden green = Fjärdhundra The coast line has changed considerably in the last millennium due to Post-glacial rebound. Originally there was a sea bay coming in from the north all the way into Uppsala

Attundaland (or the land of the eight hundreds) was the name given to the southeastern part of the present day province of Uppland, north of Stockholm. Its name refers to its role of providing 800 men and 32 ships for the leidang of the Swedish kings at Uppsala.

Snorri Sturluson relates that Tiundaland was the richest and most fertile region of Sweden. It was the seat of the Swedish kings at Uppsala and later the Swedish Archbishopric. All the Swedish lawspeakers were subordinate to the lawspeaker of Tiundaland.

The name of Attunda was revived as Attunda district court (Attunda tingsrätt) in April 2007, through the fusion of Sollentuna and Södra Roslags district courts. The seat of Attunda district court is situated in Sollentuna Municipality.

== See also ==
- Fjärdhundraland
- Roslagen
- Stones of Mora
- Suiones
- Uppsala öd
