= Leidang =

Medieval Scandinavian conscription system

The institution known as leiðangr (Old Norse), leidang (Norwegian), leding (Danish), ledung (Swedish), expeditio (Latin) or sometimes lething (English), was a form of conscription (mass levy) to organize coastal fleets for seasonal excursions and in defense of the realm typical for medieval Scandinavians and, later, a public levy of free farmers. In Anglo-Saxon England, a different system was used to achieve similar ends, and was known as the fyrd.

The first recorded instance of a Norse lething is disputed among scholars. There is considerable evidence that substantiates its existence in the late 12th century. However, there are also written sources and archeological evidence which indicate that the lething system was introduced as early as the tenth century, if not earlier.

== Origins ==
The age of the lething is disputed among scholars. The Icelandic sagas link the introduction of the lething to King Haakon I (The Good) of Norway in the tenth century.

The first known lethings are found during the ninth and tenth centuries when Sea Kings could be elected. These rulers were given provisional authority over men who had to assemble for an allotted time to achieve certain limited and pre-agreed goals. The temporary kingships of early Viking society had no power of enforcement over their men as they exercised authority only by consent.

The leidangr of Norway is first mentioned in 985 AD by the Skaldic courtly poets of Jarl Haakon of Western Norway and his son Erik. In each poem, the princes are praised for summoning the ships of the leidangr to the Battle of Hjörungavágr against a Danish fleet. The King of Norway, Harald Hardrada, is later praised by two court Skalds for summoning the leidangr to attack Denmark. Harald is also called king of the leidangr and the latter is termed almenningr, the duty and right of all men. During the 11th century Danish naval forces, though not termed leidangr, are sporadically praised as led by Danish kings (as Knut in his conquest of England). A Danish royal charter from 1085 stipulates that certain people on the lands of the canons of Lund are liable to pay fines for neglecting expeditio.

According to historian Niels Lund, there was no real leiðangr in Denmark until 1170. Historian Sverre Bagge has disputed Lund's interpretation, pointing to earlier references to a leiðangr, saga mentions of leiðangr, and archeological evidence that indicates the presence of considerable military mobilization.

Finland also had some form of ledung system after its conquest by Sweden. It was also used in Denmark as well as in Norway.

== Structure ==
The leiðangr was a system organizing a coastal fleet with the aim of defence, coerced trade, plunderings, and aggressive wars. The leidangs were centered upon a ship. The organizational unit was the ship itself with the men providing their own equipment and provisions for the journey. The ship's company agreed to serve for a certain period of time, normally, the fleet levy was on expeditions for two or three summer months. It was composed of free men who owned farms. The leiðangr differed from conventional feudalism in that the expeditions gathered around leaders based on military merit, rather than noble status.

All free men were obliged to take part in or contribute to the leiðangr. All of the leiðangr were called to arms when invading forces threatened the land. Only a fraction of the ships called to the leiðangr would take part in the expeditions, but as they were often profitable, many prominent magnates and chieftains would vy for the opportunity to join.

At its most basic level, the system relied on each hemman or farm supplying one armed man. The leidang divided the land into districts, ship's crews or ship communities, "skipreiða" (Old Norse), "skipæn" (Danish), "skeppslag" or "roslag" and also "hundaland" (Swedish, mainly east coast), "skipreide" or "skibrede" (modern Norwegian, this division/system is applied mainly to Norway and western Sweden, which in turn adhered under Norwegian rule at the time), and required every skipreide to deliver one ship and crew. These skipreide were administrative areas in which residents were assigned to outfit a ship for military use. They were collectively responsible to build, maintain, equip and staff a leidangsskip (coastal defense ship), fully provisioned for two or three months. Skipreide were mainly on the coast, but also extended quite far inland along fjords and deep waterways (“as far inland as the salmon runs”), to safeguard the procurement of timber for building of the warships. In the 1200s, each Skipreide consisted of 40 lid, and each lid of 4 farms/hemman; meaning that it took about 160 hemman to supply a ship and a crew. If enemy forces attacked the country, fires (signal beacons) built on high hills would mobilize the farmers to the skipreide. The number of farms in an area determined the size of a skipreide. It did not usually include the entire parish, nor was it confined to a parish; it could include farms from several parishes.

The farmers of each district had to build and equip a rowed sailing ship. The size of the ships was defined as a standardized number of oars, initially 40 oars, later 24 oars. In Norway, there were 279 such districts in 1277, in Denmark two-three times as many. The head of a district was called styrimaðr or styræsmand, steersman, and he functioned as captain of the ship. The smallest unit was the crew of peasants who had to arm and provide for one oarsman (hafnæ in Danish, hamna in Swedish, manngerð in Old Norse).

In Sweden a hamna was made up of two attung, which was "two eighth parts of a village". One attung seems to have been equal to the land area it took to feed an ordinary family (around 12 acres, see Hide (unit), Virgate and Oxgang for English equivalents). Each attung also regard as having a "share" in the raid, so one who owned two attung had twice as much chance to go on the raid as one who owned only one. Those who owned less than an attung had to team up with others to form a unit of one attung and share the burdens as well as the profit.

According to the Law of Uppland, the hundreds of Uppland, all in all 22 hundreds (Tiundaland; providing 10 hundreds, Attundaland; providing 8 hundreds and Fjärdhundaland; providing 4 hundreds) each of which providing four ships (four ships, each with 24 crewmen and a steersman, each equals 100 men). Also, those of Västmanland two ships and those of Roslagen one ship (the name indicate that this was seen as just one ship's crew but they were not part of a hundred and might have had the same rights/function of whole hundred only fewer people).

The older laws regulating the leiðangr (the Norwegian "Older Law of the Gulating" dates to the 11th or 12th century) require every man to, as a minimum, arm himself with an axe or a sword in addition to spear and shield, and for every rowbench (typically of two men) to have a bow and 24 arrows. Later 12th-13th century changes to this law code list more extensive equipment for the more affluent freemen, with helmet, mail hauberk, shield, spear and sword being what the well-to-do farmer or burgher must bring to war.

In 12th-13th-century sources detailing the 11th century, jarls are mentioned as the chieftain of the leiðangr. In the 12th century, a bishop could also be head of the fleet levy, although typically nobles led levies in the 12th to 14th centuries.

== During the Baltic Crusades ==
According to historical register, majority of early Baltic Crusaders in the 12th century were well-armed. During the 13th and 14th, mounted troops were raised from amongst the aristocracies of the crusading nations, but foot soldiers formed the core of armies raised by the ledung system. Each hundare district should have been able to muster up 100 men and four ships and formed a part of a larger region called Svealand, the core of the Swedish Kingdom and able to muster as 2200 warriors. The vessel, called snäcka, was a technological descendant of the Viking age warship. Ledung allows organizing an army to campaign outside its territory, useful for Baltic crusading.

== Equipment ==
During the Early Medieval Period, the majority of the leidang would have been unarmored. Some of the wealthier men may have worn gambesons and spangenhelms, while the wealthiest might wear mail. As the Viking Age began, the leidang slowly began to improve in terms of armor as their areas became richer. By the ninth century, most members of a Leidang would have had helmets either of the spangenhelm or Nasal Helm design. Drengrs would have worn mail, while wealthier freemen may have worn padded cloth/gambesons. Spears were common to all men, and many would have had short hand axes. Nobles and wealthy freemen would have had swords. Shields were used by all, and were usually round and of wood and leather construction, sometimes with leather or iron binding around the rim. By the 12th century, helmets and padded gambesons were very common, the Kettle hat type of helmet now being used alongside the earlier Nasal Helm and Spangenhelm types. Padded armour and mail were also more common among ordinary men.

== Evolution ==
In parts of the Scandinavian countries, the leiðangr evolved to a tax in the 12th century to 13th century, paid by all (free) farmers until the 19th century, although the ship-levy was frequently called out and used in the 13th–15th centuries, with the Norwegian leiðangr fleet going as far as Scotland in the 1260s. The use of the levy-tax as opposed to the use of maritime forces was more prevalent in Denmark and Sweden than Norway, since the Norwegian kingdom always depended heavily on fleet-based forces rather than land-based ones.

Skipreide, originally a defense system, later assumed other powers, such as to legal authority to pass laws and financial authority to levy taxes. Towards the end of the 13th century, they only existed for these purposes. In about 1660, skipreide were converted into tinglags, court districts that included a bygdeting (community court) or a byting (city court).

== England ==
In Anglo-Saxon times, defences were based on the fyrd. It was a militia called up from the districts threatened with attack. Service in the fyrd was usually of short duration and participants were expected to provide their own arms and provisions. The origins of the fyrd can be traced back to at least the seventh century, and it is likely that the obligation of Englishmen to serve in the fyrd dates from before its earliest appearance in written records.

Alfred the Great is credited with the development of the fyrd system together with the building of "burhs", the development of a cavalry force, and the building of a fleet. Each element of the system was meant to remedy defects in the West Saxon military establishment exposed by the Viking invasions. If, under the existing system, he could not assemble forces quickly enough to intercept mobile Viking raiders, the obvious answer was to have a standing field force. If this entailed transforming the West Saxon fyrd from a sporadic levy of king's men and their retinues into a mounted standing army, so be it. If his kingdom lacked strongpoints to impede the progress of an enemy army, he would build them. If the enemy struck from the sea, he would counter them with his own naval power. Characteristically, all of Alfred's innovations were firmly rooted in traditional West Saxon practice, drawing as they did on the three so-called ‘common burdens' of bridge work, fortress repair and service on the king's campaigns that all holders of bookland and royal loanland owed the Crown. Where Alfred revealed his genius was in designing the field force and burhs to be parts of a coherent military system. Neither Alfred's reformed fyrd nor his burhs alone would have afforded a sufficient defence against the Vikings; together, however, they robbed the Vikings of their major strategic advantages: surprise and mobility.

The fyrd was used heavily by King Harold in 1066, for example in resisting invasion by Harald Hardrada and William of Normandy.

The historian David Sturdy has cautioned about regarding the fyrd as a precursor to a modern national army composed of all ranks of society, describing it as a "ridiculous fantasy":

The persistent old belief that peasants and small farmers gathered to form a national army or fyrd is a strange delusion dreamt up by antiquarians in the late eighteenth or early nineteenth centuries to justify universal military conscription.

Henry I of England, the Anglo-Norman king who promised at his coronation to restore the laws of Edward the Confessor and who married a Scottish princess with West Saxon royal forebears, called up the fyrd to supplement his feudal levies, as an army of all England, as Orderic Vitalis reports, to counter the abortive invasions of his brother Robert Curthose, both in the summer of 1101 and in autumn 1102.

== See also ==
- Huskarl
- Druzhina
- Hird
- Comitatus
- Varangian Guard
- German Guard
- Thingmen
