= List of figures in Germanic heroic legend, F–G =

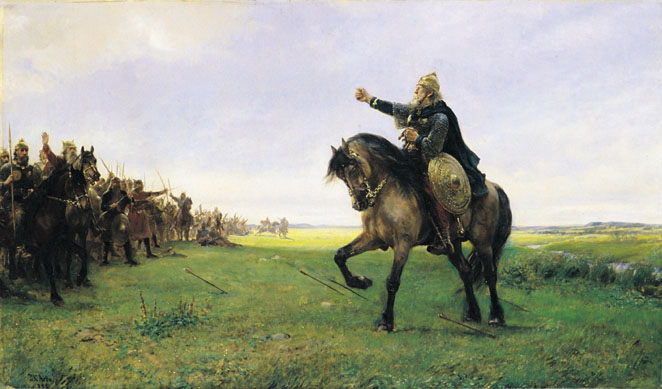
Gizur challenges the Huns by Peter Nicolai Arbo, 1886.

== F ==
Figure	Names in medieval languages	Historical origin	Name meaning	Relationships	Early and English Attestations	Norse Attestations	German Attestations
Fafnir	Old Norse: Fáfnir, Reginn (in Þiðreks saga)		Albert Murrey Sturtevant derives the name from PN Faðm-nir, meaning "embracer", because he lay embracing his treasure.	The dragon killed by Sigurd/Siegfried. In the Norse tradition, the dragon was originally a giant who guards a cursed treasure, and his brother the smith Regin uses Sigurd to kill Fafnir. In the German tradition, the dragon is nameless, but in the Þiðreks saga, the dragon is named Regin.		Reginsmál, Fáfnismál, Völsunga saga, Norna-Gests þáttr	Unnamed in Nibelungenlied, Lied vom Hürnen Seyfrid, as Reginn in Þiðreks saga
Fasolt (Fasold)	Middle High German: Vâsolt, later Fasolt, Old Norse: Fasold	Probably originally a weather demon connected to the South Tyrolian mountain Jochgrimm.	Name probably from same stem as OHG faso ("fringe, edge, thread"), from PIE *pēs ("to blow") referring to Fasolt's braided hair.	A giant with long flowing hair and brother of Ecke. In the Eckenlied, Dietrich encounters him hunting a maiden through the forest, and defeats him defeats him by cutting off his locks. Fasolt attempts to have Dietrich treacherously killed after learning that he has killed his brother Ecke. Dietrich eventually kills him. In Þiðreks saga, Fasolt instead joins Dietrich's band of heroes, and is eventually killed by Hertnið.			Eckenlied, Þiðreks saga, Dietrich und Fasolt.
Fasti	Old Norse: Fasti		Fasti is a form of Fastr which means "strong", but it also means "boar". Wessén derives the name of Vǫttr and his brother/co-jarl Fasti from old Scandinavian legal language, where vǫttr means "juror" and fasti means "witness in real estate transactions".	According to the Ynglinga saga, the Danish king Fróði had appointed Fasti and Vǫttr as jarls and protectors of Denmark while he was away. They caught the Swedish king Óttar/Ohthere with his raiding fleet in the Limfjord where they raided in Vendill, and after a fierce battle they slew him, and laid him on a mound to be devoured by wild animals, and sent a wooden crow back to Sweden in his stead, after which they called him Vendill crow. Historia Norwegiæ tells that the Swedish king was killed by a Danish jarl who was also named Óttar and his brother Fasti in a Danish province named Vendill. Klaeber comments that this is based on the same tradition as Wulf ("wolf") and Eofor ("wild boar") and that the names are more authentic than the appellatives presented in Beowulf. However, the ON account is aberrant because the battle has been moved from Ongentheow/Egil^{2} to Óttar/Ohthere, which is shown by the fact that it was Egil^{2} who was originally called Vendelcrow (Íslendingabók) and also in the fact that the location Vendill must have been moved from the Swedish Vendel to Vendsyssel in Denmark.	Cognate with Eofor of Beowulf	Ynglingatal, Historia Norwegiæ, Ynglinga saga 27	
Fenja	Old Norse: Fenja		The name probably means "heath-dweller" or "fen-dweller".	Grottasǫngr informs that the giantesses Fenja and Menja were sisters and that they were the nieces of the giant Þjazi, and were daughters of two male giants. In the Prose Edda, Snorri tells that the mythical Danish king Fróði had bought them from king Fjölnir in Sweden. He made them grind an enormous mill that produced anything Fróði wanted. However, he never let them rest, so in revenge they produced an army led by a sea-king named Mýsingr who killed Fróði, and ended the era of peace called the Fróði-peace. He ordered them to grind salt and also refused them to rest. In the end they produced so much salt that the ship sank and the sea turned salty.		Grottasǫngr, Skáldskaparmál (40), scaldic poetry by Þórmóðr Bersason	
Filimer		No scholar contests the archaeological evidence of the migration that corresponds to the one led by Filimer, and it probably took place in the late 2nd c. or in the second third of the 3rd c. at the latest.	First element PGmc *filu ("much"), second element PGmc *maru ("famous").	According to Gothic tradition the fifth king after Berig and the son of Gerdarig, he led the migrations of the Gothic army and their families to more fertile lands that they found in Scythia, a land the inhabitants called Oium.	Getica		
Finn^{1}	Old English: Finn	Possibly originally a historical person.	"Finn," referring to the nomadic non-Germanic inhabitants of Scandinavia. From PGmc *fënþan ("to go"), cf. OHG fẹndo ("one who goes by foot"). The name is probably of North Germanic origin, but can be found in West Germanic place names. He has been connected with the Scandinavian legend of the giant mason Finn in Sweden.	Finn invited his brother-in-law the Danish ruler Hnæf and a retinue of 60 other Danes to a feast in his hall. In the morning, Finn attacks the guests in the hall but they defend themselves for five days without losses. Eventually Hnæf is slain, but Finn has so few men left that he is unable to continue the attack, so he has to agree on peace with Hnæf's successor Hengest. The remaining Danes stay in Friesland over the winter, but Hengest longs for revenge, and eventually his warriors Guthlaf and Oslaf exhort him to avenge their fallen kinsmen. Finn is attacked and killed, and Finn's wife Hildeburh is taken home together with the Frisian royal treasure.	Finnsburg Fragment, Beowulf, Widsith		
Finn^{2}	Old Norse: Finnr		See Finn^{1}	The Saami king of Finnmark, and the father of Hvít.		Hrólfs saga kraka	
Fjölnir	Old Norse: Fjǫlnir, Latin: Fiolni		The meaning of the name is contested, but it may be derived from fjǫl ("many") and mean "the rich, mighty one". It is also one of Odin's names.	A Swedish king who was the son of the Norse god (Yngvi-)Freyr and the giantess Gerðr, and he was the father of Sveigðir. He visited king Fróði at a feast, but was so drunk that he fell into a vat of mead and drowned. Saxo in Gesta Danorum gives the same account of a Swedish king Hundingus who visited Haddingus, but he had probably transposed the tradition of Fjölnir to different legendary characters.		Grottasǫngr, Skáldskaparmál (40), Ynglingatal (I), Historia Norwegiæ, Íslendingabók, Ynglinga saga (11), Gesta Danorum (I)	
Fjörnir	Old Norse: Fjǫrnir		The name is a poetic word for "helmet" or rather "life protector" from From ON fjǫr ("life").	Gunnar's cup-bearer. When Gunnar and his brother Högni are about to leave for their fateful visit to their sister gudrún and Atli (Attila), her husband, Atlakvíða and Völsunga saga has Gunnar ask Fjörnir to find them some good wine to drink because it may be the last time they have a banquet.		Atlakvíða, Völsunga saga	
Folcwalda	Old English: Folcwalda		The first element is from PGmc *fulkan ("crowd", "army") and the second from PGmc *waldanan ("to rule").	He is mentioned in Widsith (line 27) and in Beowulf (line 1089) as the father of Finn^{1}, in reference to legend told in a partially lost lay called The Fight at Finnsburg.	Widsith, Beowulf		
Folkvid	Old Norse: Fólkvíðr		The first element Fólk- means "a group of (warring?) people", while The last element is -víðr, from PN *wiðu- meaning "trees" or "forest". The names of the three brothers Hulvíðr, Gautvíðr and Fólkvíðr agree with Swedish naming traditions.	According to the Ynglinga saga, Folkvid, Hulvid and Gautvid were the sons of Svipdag^{4} the Blind, the king of Sweden's representative while away from Uppsala. When Ingjald ill-ruler invited several neighbouring petty kings to a feast at his hall, it was Folkvid and Hulvid who barred the doors of the hall and set it ablaze, as previously ordered by the king.		Ynglinga saga	
Franmar	Old Norse: Fránmarr		The first element fránn means "gleaming" and is only used in poetry about serpents and in metaphors for sharp weapons. The second element -marr means "excellent", "commendable".	Franmar is a jarl who has a daughter named Álof^{1}, and a foster-daughter named Sigrlinn, who is the daughter of king Svafnir of Svavaland. Franmar can shape-shift into an eagle, and it is as an eagle that he negotiates with Atli about the price he wants for his ward Sigrlinn to marry king Hjörvard^{4} (the price is exorbitant). It is also as an eagle that he magically protects the building where he has housed Álof^{1} and Sigrlinn while Sigrlinn's second suitor king Hrothmar invades, pillages and kills Sigrlinn's father Svafnir. When Atli finds the house and the entranced eagle, he kills it and takes the girls. Atli marries Álof^{1} and Hjörvard^{4} marries Sigrlinn with whom he has the son Helgi Hjörvardsson, the hero of Helgakvíða Hjǫrvarðssonar.		Helgakvíða Hjǫrvarðssonar	
Freawaru	Old Norse: Hrút, Old English: Frēawaru	Beowulf is generally considered to be based on historic people and events.	Malone comments that in accordance with her dynasty's naming tradition, her name would have begun with an h and her real name is preserved as Hrút ("sheep") in Gesta Danorum. Frēawaru was a title or an epithet, like "royal highness" referring to her role as hostess. The Beowulf poet either did not know her real name or preferred the epithet to a name that meant "sheep". Frēawaru is derived from PN *fraujawaru, where the first element is *fraujaz ("lord") and the second a feminization of *-waraz, an agent noun of *warōn ("to be watchful").	In Beowulf, the Scylding king Hroðgar marries off his daughter to the Heaðobard ruler Ingeld, the son of Froda, whom they had killed, in the hope of securing peace. However, during the feast, an old Heaðobard warrior notices a sword that a young Danish retainer has and recognizes it as a Heaðobard sword captured in battle, and reminds his people of their defeat. A young man whose father it had belonged to slays the retainer and escapes. After this Ingeld's interest in his young bride, and in peace, are predicted not to last. In the Scandinavian tradition, the Skjöldunga saga relates that Ingeld's rejected wife gave him the son Agnarr. In Gesta Danorum II, she marries Ingeld's son Agnarr instead, and there is a fight in which Bödvar Bjarki kills Agnarr, but she becomes Bödvar Bjarki's wife as right of conquest. She also appears in Gesta Danorum VI, where she is the daughter of Swerting and given by her brothers to Ingeld. During the wedding the old warrior (Starkad) reminds Ingeld that he has failed to avenge his father Froda. After an admonishing speech, Ingeld and Starkad kill her brothers and Ingeld appears to divorce her. Malone suggests that she is the basis of Åsa^{1}, the daughter of the Swedish king Ingjald in Ynglinga saga.	Beowulf	Gesta Danorum (II and VI), unnamed in Skjöldunga saga	
Freawine	Old English: Freāwine, Latin: Frowinus		The first element Freā- is from PGmc *fraw(j)ōn ("lord", "master"), and the second element -wine from PGmc *weniz ("friend").	He is mentioned in the Anglo-Saxon chronicle as a descendant of Odin (Wodan) and as the father of Wig. In the Danish accounts, he is the governor of the region of Schleswig and the father of Ket and Wig. During a Swedish invasion, he is killed by the Swedish king Athislus in single combat, after which Wermund appoints his sons Ket and Wig as successors. They will avenge their father but at the same time bring disgrace to their tribe by ambushing and killing Athils in Sweden. Frowinus' daughter is married to Wermund's son Offa, who will redeem their tribe, by defeating two men in single combat.	The Anglo-Saxon chronicle	Gesta Danorum (IV), Brevis historia regum Dacie	
Friderich	Middle High German: Friderîch, Friðrekr, Latin: Fridericus (Annals of Quedlinburg), possibly Old English: Freoþerīc	Possibly derived from Ermanaric's son Hunimundus, but with the name Friderich possibly deriving from a Rugian prince named Frideric (died 492).	MHG Friderich from PGmc *friþu- ("peace") and rīk- ("king").	In the German tradition, the son of Ermanaric. In Dietrichs Flucht, Ermanaric refuses to exchange Friderich, who has been captured by Dietrich, for Dietrich's prisoners. In the Þiðreks saga, Ermanaric sends Friderich to gather tribute from the Veleti at Sibeche's advice, causing them to kill him as Sibeche planned.	Possibly in Widsith.		Annals of Quedlinburg, Dietrichs Flucht, Þiðreks saga
Fridla, Fritla, Fritele				See Harlungen			
Fridlevus II	Old Norse: Friðleifr, Latin: Fridleifus		The first element is from PN *friþuʀ ("love" and "peace") and the second and the second element is from *-laibaʀ which means "descendant" or "heir".	According to Skjöldunga saga, Fridleifus and his brother Haldanus (Healfdene) were the sons of king Frodo III and Inga, the daughter of the Swedish king Ingo (Yngvi^{1}), son of Alaricus (Alaric). As a ruler, he rejected religious worship and sorcery and instead invested in the best warriors, such as Starkad. He kidnapped Hilda, the daughter of king Alo of Oppland and forced her to marry him. Together they had the son Alo the Bold (Áli hinn fraeckne), and with another wife he had Frodo IV.		Skjöldunga saga, Ynglinga saga	
Frithjof	Old Norse: Friðþjófr					Friðþjófs saga hins frœkna	
Fróði	Old English: Frōda, Old Norse: Fróði, Latin: Frotho or Frodo, Middle High German: Fruote	Most likely ahistorical.	"Wise, old". From PN Frōda meaning "wise", "learned", "knowledgable".	Usually a king of Denmark, but possibly several figures. In Beowulf, father of Ingeld.	Beowulf	Gesta Danorum, Grottasöngr, Skáldskaparmál, Skjöldunga saga, Heimskringla	Kudrun, Rabenschlacht, Rosengarten zu Worms, Wolfdietrich
Frosti	Old Norse: Frosti	Most likely fictive.	The name Frosti is derived from frost ("frost").	A Sámi king who was killed by the Swedish king Agne when he went pillaging in Finland (Lapland). Agne took his daughter Skjálf and son Logi prisoner. In Hversu Noregs byggdisk, he is the father of Snjo ("snow") in a genealogical list of the elements.		Ynglinga saga (19), Hversu Noregs byggdisk	

== G ==
Figure	Names in medieval languages	Historical origin	Name meaning	Relationships	Early and English Attestations	Norse Attestations	German Attestations
Gambara	Latin: Gambara, Gambaruc		The name may be gand-bara "carrier of the magical staff" as Germanic wise women used staffs in their rituals. The Old Norse word Völva ("wise woman") has the same derivation, from vǫlr ("staff").	The Historia Langobardorum tells that Gambara was a wise woman whose sons Aio (Agio) and Ybor (Ibor), led their people, the Winnili from Scandinavia to Scoringa, where they settled. The Vandals, led by Ambri and Assi, demanded that the Winili pay tribute to them or face war. Gambara advised them to go to war instead, and they sent a messenger to the Vandals that they would rather fight than be slaves. Gambara addressed the goddess Frigg (Frēa), and she told her that the Winnili women should but their hair in front of their faces like beards, and stand next to their men. When the god Odin (Godan) saw them in the morning he asked who the "long beards" were, and Frigg prevailed on Odin to give the Winnili victory against the Vandals, and the Winnili were from then on called Lombards ("long beards").	Origo Gentis Langobardorum, Historia Langobardorum, Prosper of Aquitaine	Gesta Danorum	
Gandalf	Old Norse: Gandalfr, Old Norse: Álfr		The name means "wizard" or "bewitched demon".	In Ynglinga saga, he is the son of king Alfgeirr of Alfheim who had conquered Vingulmark and put him in charge of the new territory. In Hálfdanar saga svarta, he fights with his sons Hýsingr, Helsingr and Haki against Halfdan the Black for the domination of what is today south-eastern Norway, until he is killed and a border is established at Glomma River. In Sögubrot, Gandalf is the king of Alfheim (initially, identified with an ancestor, see Alf^{8} but this is later changed to Gandalf), and the father of Alfhild^{3} who marries the Swedish king (Sigurd) Ring, and so he becomes the grandfather of Ragnar Lodbrok. Gandalf's sons Alfar and Alfarin are the bodyguards of Sigurd's enemy Harald Wartooth in the Battle of Brávellir. In Gesta Danorum, his sons are mentioned as close to Harald, but not named. Later in Sögubrot, Gandalf's sons ask the Swedish king to help them in a war in Westfold. In Norna-Gests þáttr, Gandalf is also the father-in-law of the Swedish king Sigurd Ring. The Swedish king sends Gandalf's sons to Gunnar and Högni^{1} asking them to pay tribute, or the Franks will face an invasion. The Swedes are however diverted by another war in the east, so Gandalf's sons attack on their own assisted by Starkad but are defeated.		Ynglinga saga, Hálfdanar saga svarta, Norna-Gests þáttr, Sögubrot, Gesta Danorum (VIII)	
Garulf	Old English: Gārulf		The first element is *gaizaz ("spear"), and the second element is *wulfaz ("wolf").	Garulf is involved in the Frisian attack on Hnæf's hall and he is called Guthlaf's son, but a man by that name also appears among the defenders. This has been interpreted as father and son fighting on opposing sides, like Hadubrand and Hildebrand^{1}, as a coincidence, or as a scribal error where Garulf's father was originally named Guthulf. At Finnsburg, he dies like Hnæf and a young Frisian prince, Finn^{1}'s and Hildeburh's son.	Finnsburg Fragment		
Gautr, Gauti	Old Norse: Gautr,Old Norse: Gauti, Latin: Gapt, Gaut, or Gausus (Edictum Rothari), Old English: Geat	Perhaps originally the God Odin. As a king of the Geats in legendary sagas probably fictive with his name derived from his kingdom Västergötland (Gautland).	The name means "Goth" or "Geat". The form Gauti was short form of names with Gaut- or -gaut, but it can also be a name or an epithet derived from Gautr, or its root.	A figure who was counted as the legendary ancestor of the Goths and Lombards, as well an ancestor in Anglo-Saxon royal genealogies. Simek writes that as a mythical ancestor of the Goths (Gapt) and considered an ancestor in so many places he may have been the same as Odin in the Germanic tribes' common homeland in Scandinavia. According to Ynglinga saga, the Geats and Götaland were named after him, and he was the father of king Gautrekr the mild and the grandfather of king Algaut whose daughter was Gauthildr (see below). In Bósa saga ok Herrauðs, he was the father of Gautrekr the generous and king Hring of Östergötland, and thus the grandfather of Herrauðr of the legend of Ragnar Lodbrok. In Gautreks saga, the first chapter is about king Gauti of Götaland who while lost in the forest met a family who were so stingy that almost all of them committed suicide by throwing themselves from the "family cliff" rather than feed a guest. However, he impregnates the daughter Snotra who bears him the son Gautrekr the generous. He is also mentioned in Gesta Danorum (Goto).	Jordanes, Historia Langobardorum	Ynglinga saga, Af Upplendinga Konungum, Bósa saga ok Herrauðs, Gautreks saga, Gesta Danorum (VIII)	
Gauthildr	Old Norse: Gauthildr		The first element is from gautr ("geat"), while -hildr is from PN *heldiō- ("strife, conflict")	A Geatish princess, the daughter of Algaut (son of Gautrek) of Västergötland, and Alof^{2} (daughter of Olaf the Keen-eyed of Nerike) she was married to the Swedish king Ingjald ill-ruler. They had the children Åsa^{1} and Olof Trätälja.		Ynglinga saga, Af Upplendinga Konungum	
Gautrekr	Old Norse: Gautrekr, Latin: Gotricus, Latin: Gautric	Probably fictive with his name derived from his kingdom Västergötland (Gautland).	The first element is from gautr ("geat"), and the second one from -rekr ("powerful").	A legendary king of Västergötland (Gautland). According to Ynglinga saga, Gautrekr the mild was the son of Gautr, and the father of king Algaut whose daughter was Gauthildr (see above). In Bósa saga ok Herrauðs, Gautrekr the generous is the son of Gauti, and the brother of king Hring of Östergötland, and thus the uncle of Herrauðr of the saga, and of the legend of Ragnar Lodbrok. In the Skjöldunga saga as preserved in Ad catalogum regum Sveciæ annotanda, he (Gautric) has the role of Herrauðr instead, and is the father of Thora who married Ragnar Lodbrok. In Gautreks saga, Gautrekr the generous is the son of king Gauti and a girl named Snotra from a family who were so stingy that almost all of them committed suicide by throwing themselves from the "family cliff" rather than feed a guest. In the rest of the saga he appears in his interaction with a man named Refr. The two are also mentioned in Gesta Danorum (Gotricus) together with Gautrek's father. Gautrek's mention in Háttalykill (c. 1150) confirms that he was a character famous for his generosity. His interactions with Refr are recapitulated in Hrólfs saga Gautrekssoner for which Gautrek's saga appears to have been written as a prequel, and which deals with his son Hrólfr. Both sagas also deal with his depression after the death of his queen Álfhildr, the daughter of king Harald of Wendland. The second saga adds that he married again, and it was Ingibjorg, the only daughter of the chieftain Thorir of Sogn, after which he had the sons Hrólfr and Kettil.		Gautrek's saga, Hrólfs saga Gautrekssonar, Bósa saga ok Herrauðs, Af Upplendinga Konungum, Ynglinga saga, Gesta Danorum (VIII), Háttalykill, Prose Edda (Nafnaþulur), Ad catalogum regum Sveciæ annotanda	
Gautvid	Old Norse: Gautvíðr		The first element is from gautr ("geat"), and the second one is -víðr, from PN *wiðu- meaning "trees" or "forest". The names of the three brothers Hulvíðr, Gautvíðr and Fólkvíðr agree with Swedish naming traditions.	One of the sons of Svipdag^{4} the Blind, and foster-brother of Ingjald. One Midwinter sacrifice at the Temple at Uppsala, when they were about six year old, Gautvid reported to his father that Ingjald had played with Alf^{5}, the son of king Ingvar of Fjädrundaland, but that Ingjald was weaker and cried. Disgusted with his foster-son's weakness, Svipdag roasted Ingjald a wolf's heart and made him eat it, after which Ingjald became fierce and had a bad temper. Gautvid, his brother Hulvid, and their father Svipdag fell in battle against Granmar of Södermanland and his ally Hjörvard^{2} Wulfing.		Ynglinga saga	
Geat	Old English: Gēat, Old Norse: Gauti		See Gaut and Gauti above.	For the Anglo-Saxon ancestor figure, see Gaut and Gauti, above. In the Old English poem Deor there is a reference to Mǣðhilde and her lover Geat: "We learned that, [namely] Mæðhild's moans, [they] became numberless, [the moans] of Geat's lady, so that that distressing love robbed her of all sleep". There is a group of medieval Scandinavian ballads called Harpans kraft, where the Icelandic and the Norwegian versions preserve the names of the love couple as Magnhild and Gauti, where Gauti is the Scandinavian form of Geat, Mǣðhilde's lover. In the Scandinavian version, Magnhild dreams nightmares of falling into a nearby river. Gauti builds a strong bridge over the river and takes all possible precautions that she will be safe. However, fate still makes Magnhild fall into it and drown becoming captive of the river's water spirit. Gauti recuperates her by playing on his harp. In the Icelandic version, the ending is tragic and Gauti finds his lover dead, while in the Norwegian the ending is happy, and Malone argues that Deor also has a happy ending and that the laments are those of the water spirit.	Deor (line 15b)	Medieval Scandinavian ballads (Harpans kraft)	
Gefulf	Old English: Gefulf		Gef- is probably from gefan ("to give") and an epithet that praises his generosity, and Wulf ("wolf") would have been his proper name.	Appears in Widsith, line 26, where he appears to be a king of the Jutes. He is not known from other sources.	Widsith		
Geigaðr	Old Norse: Geigaðr, Latin: Gegathus		Geigr means "a scathe, serious hurt". According to Olrik, the name is based on that of the hero Beigaðr.	Geigaðr and Svipdagr^{3} are two brothers who are outstanding warriors and who appear in two Scandinavian legendary accounts of the death of king Hygelac. It takes six champions to handle each one and in the end of the battle they are taken captive. By the time, Snorri tells of Hygelac's final battle, the Geats appear to have been subsumed by the Swedes, and Hugleikr is described as a Swedish king who was killed by Starkad, but in Gesta Danorum (VI) the same story is told with Huglethus as a king of Ireland. In Gesta Danorum, the legendary hero Starkad takes on Geigaðr, but is so severely wounded by him that Starkad later composes a poem on the wound. Malone considers Geigaðr to be unhistorical but Svipdagr to be based on a historical Beowulf.		Ynglinga saga (22), Gesta Danorum (VI)	
Geirþjófr	Old Norse: Geirþjófr, Latin: Geirtiofus		The first element geirr means "spear" and the second element þjófr means "thief".	The king of the Saxons and married to Álof^{3} the Powerful. In Skjöldunga saga, he is abroad when the Danish king Halga visits his queen (he later kidnaps her and impregnates her with Yrsa), and in Ynglinga saga, he is abroad when the Swedish king Eadgils pillages his country and captures Yrsa.		Skjöldunga saga, Ynglinga saga	
Geirmund	Old Norse: Geirmundr	Appears to be an invention of the poet.	The first element geirr means "spear" and the second element is ON mundr ("protector").	In the eddic poem Oddrúnargrátr, the poem relates that Oddrun is visiting Geirmund at his stronghold on the island of Læsø, when she hears her lover Gunnar play the harp in the snake pit that her brother Atli (Attila) had put him in. She sails across the sound to discover that she arrives too late because her and Atli's mother has already killed Gunnar in the form of a snake. Geirmund is otherwise unknown.		Oddrúnargrátr	
Geitir	Old Norse: Geitir		The name is derived from Geitr ("goat").	Grípir's man who receives Sigurd at the gates of his residence. He goes to tell Grípir that a stranger wants to see him, and when Grípir and Sigurd meet, Grípir asks him to take care of Sigurd's horse Grani.		Grípispá	
Gelpfrat	Gelpfrât		The name Gelpfrat comes from OHG kelf ("noise, uproar, boasting"), and PGmc *rādi- ("council" or "supplies").	The Margrave of Bavaria and brother of Else^{1} in the Nibelungenlied. He and his brother attack the Burgundians after they cross the Danube. Gelpfrat is killed by Dankwart.			Nibelungenlied, Biterolf und Dietleib
Gerbart	Middle High German: Gêrbart		The first element is from OHG gêr ("spear"), while the second element is from barda ("beard").	The brother of Wichart, he dies fighting the Burgundians in the Nibelungenlied. In Virginal, he is counted among the Wulfings.			Nibelungenlied, Nibelungenklage, Biterolf und Dietleib, Virginal
Gere	Middle High German: Gêre	Probably based on the historical margrave of northern Thuringia Gero (died 965).	The name is from OHG gêr ("spear")	A margrave and vassal of the Burgundian kings. In the Nibelungenlied, he accompanies them part of the way from Worms to Attila's court. In Biterolf und Dietleib, he aids the Burgundians in the tournament against Dietrich von Bern's men. In Dietrichs Flucht, he fights for Dietrich against Ermanaric.			Nibelungenlied, Biterolf und Dietleib, Dietrichs Flucht
Gerlind	Middle High German: Gêrlint		First element OHG *gêr ("spear"), second element OHG *lindi ("soft").	Mother of Hartmut and wife of Ludwig von Normandie. She is abusive to Kudrun after she has been abducted and is described as evil.			Kudrun
Gernot/Guthormr^{1}	Old Norse: Gutþormr or Old Norse: Gernoz (Þiðreks saga), Middle High German: Gêrnôt.	Historical Burgundian king Gundomar, died c.411	The ON name has replaced the (for ON) regularly derived PN form *Gunn-mārr or Gōð/Guð-mārr with the common personal name PN *Guðþormr, first element possibly related to ON goð ("god"), second possibly to ON þyrma ("to spare"). MHG "Gernot" not descended from the name "Gundomar", but from gêr ("spear") and possibly OHG hnôtôn ("to swing a spear").	In the Old Norse tradition, half brother of Gunnarr and Högni; in the continental tradition, brother of Gunther, Giselher, and Kriemhild. In the Nibelungenlied, Gernot is consulted on Sigurd/Siegfried's murder, but takes no part in it. When the Burgundians are attacked at Attila's hall, he and Rüdiger kill each other. Essentially the same profile emerges in the Þiðreks saga, except that he is killed fighting Bleda. In other German epics, he plays a small role. In the Norse tradition, he has not sworn a pact with Sigurd/Siegfried, and is thus chosen by Gunnarr and Hagen/Högni to kill Sigurd. Sigurd cuts him in two with his sword while dying.		Grípisspá, Brot af Sigurðarkviðu, Sigurðarkviða hin skamma, Guðrúnarkvíða II, Skáldskaparmál, Völsunga saga, Norna-Gests þáttr	Nibelungenlied, Þiðreks saga, Biterolf und Dietleib, Rosengarten zu Worms, Dietrichs Flucht, Rabenschlacht
Gerwart von Troyen	Middle High German: Gêrwart von Troyen, alias Gêrhart, Vordeck, or Wildunc von Biterne		The first element is from OHG gêr ("spear"), and the second element is from wardu ("guardian").	In Ortnit, Gerwart aids Ortnit on his bridal quest. In Wolfdietrich, he claims that he has slain the dragon that killed Ortnit in order to claim Ortnit's widow's hand in marriage and inherit the kingdom. In one version, Wolfdietrich (who has really slain the dragon) kills him; in another, he pardons him.			Ortnit, Wolfdietrich
Gerwit	Latin: Gerwit		The first element is from OHG gêr ("spear"), but the second element may have several origins, such as witu ("wood") and wît ("wide")	A count from Worms, he is one of Gunther's men killed by Walter of Aquitaine.			Waltharius
Gestumblindi	Old Norse: Gestumblindi, Old Norse: Gestiblindus		A name for the Norse god Odin and an altered form of gest-inn-blinda ("the blind guest") as a reference to his wanderings and lack of one eye.	In Hervarar saga, Odin himself takes the place of a man who has sacrificed to him for help in a meeting with Heidrek. After a contest of riddles, Heidrek realizes that he has been dealing with Odin himself, whereupon he seizes the cursed sword Tyrfing to attack him. Odin changes into a hawk and Heidrek only manages to shorten his tailfeathers, which is why the hawk has short tailfeathers. For this attack Odin curses Heidrek to be killed by thralls. In Gesta Danorum V there are no riddles, but instead Gestumblindi is a king of the Geats who seeks the aid of Frodi against king Alaric of Sweden. He is aided by Eric who defeats Alarec.		Hervarar saga, Gesta Danorum V	
Giselher	Old English: Gīslhere, Old Norse: Gisler, Middle High German: Gîselhêr	Gislaharius, historical Burgundian kings, died before 432	First element either related to modern German Geisel ("hostage"), with the name meaning "young nobleman" or to ON gisli ("arrow"), with the latter name suggesting a meaning "man experienced in shooting arrows".	Brother of Gunther, Gernot, and Kriemhild, son of Dancrat/Gibeche. He is the youngest brother and takes no part in the murder of Sigurd/Siegfried. When the Burgundians are on their way to Attila's hall, he is betrothed to Rüdiger's daughter Dietlind at Bechalaren. He dies fighting Wolfhart, whom he kills. In the Þiðreks saga, he dies when Kriemhild/Gudrun sticks a firebrand into his mother.	Possibly in Widsith.		Nibelungenlied, Þiðreks saga, Biterolf und Dietleib
Gísl and Öndur	Old Norse: Gísl and Ǫndurr		Gísl is from PGmc *gīslaz ("hostage"), while Ǫndurr means "snow shoe".	Snorri tells about the early Swedish king Vísburr married the daughter of Auði inn auðgi (the Wealthy), but rejected her, and she went to her father with their sons Gísl and Ǫndurr. He married another woman and had the son Dómaldi with her. When his rejected sons were 12 and 13, they came to him to claim their mother's gold necklace, but their father refused. Gísl and Ǫndurr contacted Huld who promised to help them kill their father by casting a curse on him, but warned that doing so she would curse the Yngling dynasty with kinslaying. The two boys did not heed the warning but set their father's hall on fire one night and burnt him to death with his retinue.		Ynglinga saga (14)	
Gizur	Old Norse: Gizurr	Unknown, possibly a historical figure from modern Ukraine.	It is derived from *Gitsvarr meaning "counselor". It is one of the names of Odin, but in the Battle of the Goths and Huns it is the name of the king of the Geats and the king's counselor. When the tribes and their rulers are listed, Gizur and the Geats are named between the Huns and the Goths, as if to promote the Geats.	Gizur is Heidrek's foster-father, who is the king of the Geats, but who is also Heidrek's advisor and called grýtingalidi ("vassal or retainer of the Goths") in the poem. Although old, he equips himself for war and challenges the Huns to a pitched battle on behalf of the Goths.		Hervarar saga	
Gjaflaug		An invention of the poet of Guðrúnarkviða I.	The first element is gjaf- from PGmc *ʒebō, "gift" (partly *ʒebiz). The second element -laug is the feminine form of laugʀ from PGmc *lauʒ- (the same as Gothic liugan) meaning "to marry", "to give a sacred promise" and as a name element it would have meant "promised to" or "initiated to".	Gudrun's aunt. She tries to comfort her after the death of Sigurd.		Guðrúnarkviða I	
Gjúki	Old English: Gifica, Latin: Gibicho, Old Norse: Gjúki or Aldrian (Þiðreks saga), Middle High German: Dancrat (Nibelungenlied) or Gibeche (elsewhere)	Historical Burgundian king Gibica.	From PGmc *geba- ("to give").	Father of Gunther/Gunnar, Giselher, Gernot/Guthormr, and Gudrun/Kriemhild. In Waltharius, he sends Hagen/Högni^{1} as a hostage to the Huns. In the Rosengarten zu Worms, he fights and is defeated by Hildebrand^{1} in the tournament organized by Kriemhild. In the Nibelungenlied, the name Gibeche is given to an exile living at Attila's court. In Norse sources, his role is more indirect, although it is still important as the father of Gunnar, Högni, Gudthorm^{1} and Gudrun.	Widsith	Frequently mentioned as the father of Gunnarr and Högni.	Waltharius, Rosengarten zu Worms, Lied vom Hürnen Seyfrid, Heldenbuch-Prosa
Gjuki Högnason	Old Norse: Gjúki Hǫgnason		See Gjuki above.	The son of Högni^{2} and Kostbera, and the brother of Solar and Snaevar. He appears in Dráp Niflunga. He and his brothers accompany their father and uncle Gunnar and to the court of Atli (Attila), where they are all killed.		Dráp Niflunga	
Glaumvör	Old Norse: Glaumvǫr		Glaum- means "noisy merriment" from PGmc *ʒlaumaz, and vör is the feminine form of varr, from *warjaz ("defender").	Gunnar's second wife. She has a disturbing dream warning him not to go to Attila's hall, but he ignores it.		Atlamál, Völsunga saga	
Gnepja	Old Norse: Gnepja, Latin: Gnepia		It was also the name of a giantess and is derived from the word gnapa, which means "to jut out" or "stoop forward".	He appears at the massive Battle of Brávellir as one of the Danish king Harald Wartooth's warriors against the Swedish king Sigurd Ring. He was a great champion and gave Starkad a fierce fight before Starkad killed him. In Gesta Danorum called Gnepia the Old and he is mentioned together with a warrior named Garth, but in Gesta Danorum Starkad only managed to wound Gnepia.		Sögubrot, Gesta Danorum (VIII)	
Goðgestr	Old Norse: Goðgestr		Goð- is a form of guð- meaning "god", and gestr means "guest".	The king of Hålogaland who receives the horse Hrafn from the Swedish king Aðils (Eadgils), which had been bred from the horse Hrafn that Aðils had taken in battle from Áli (Onela). Goðgestr can not handle the horse and is thrown off and killed.		Ynglinga saga (29)	
Goldemar	Middle High German: Goldemâr		The first element is goltha ("gold"), and the second element is maru ("fame").	A dwarf king; Dietrich von Bern sees that he has kidnapped a princess, whom he rescues.			Goldemar, Heldenbuch-Prosa
Gollnir	Old Norse: Gǫllnir		From gǫll meaning a "shriek".	A giant. In Helgakvíða Hundingsbana I, during a flyting, Sinfjötli accuses his opponent Gudmund^{2} of having milked the she-goats of Gollnir. In the Völsunga saga, he accuses his opponent (renamed Granmar) of having been Gollnir's goat-herd		Helgakvíða Hundingsbana I, Völsunga saga	
Gotele	Middle High German: Gotele		The first element got- means "good", see Gotelind, below.	One of Attila's vassals. In Biterolf und Dietleib, he leads Attila's armies against the Poles.			Dietrichs Flucht, Rabenschlacht, Alpharts Tod, Biterolf und Dietleib
Gotelind	Middle High German: Gotelint, Old Norse: Gudelinda		The first element is PGmc *gōda ("good"), the second element is PGmc *lindi ("soft, flexible; snake").	Rüdiger's wife. She gives the Burgundians the shield of her slain son Nuodung when they are in Bechelaren, and has dreams of ill-omen of her husband's death.			Nibelungenlied, Nibelungenklage, Þiðreks saga
Granmar	Old Norse: Granmarr	Possibly a historical king of Södermanland in the 7th c.	The first element means "moustache", cf. Grani, from PGmc *ʒranō, and the second element marr is from PN *māriʀ ("excellent").	According to Ynglinga saga king of Södermanland. As he lacked a son, he appointed as successor Hjörvard^{2} Wulfing who married his daughter Hildegunn. Together with Högni^{3} the king of Östergötland, whose daughter he had married, he defended his kingdom against the Swedish king Ingjald Ill-ruler, who killed him through arson on Selaön. Sögubrot adds that he shared the rule of Östergötland with Högni^{3}. According to the Helgi lays, he had the sons Hothbrodd and Gudmund, and the lays have also added the hero Starkad as a third son. Hothbrodd was betrothed to Högni^{3}'s daughter Sigrun. This daughter was coveted by Helgi Hundingsbane who fought for her against Granmar^{1}'s sons. In the Völsunga saga, his name is erroneously given to his son Gudmund^{2}, or he has taken his son's place.		Ynglinga saga, Sögubrot af nokkrum fornkonungum, Völsunga saga, Helgakviða Hundingsbana I, Helgakviða Hundingsbana II.	
Grendel	Old English: Grendel	Possibly of mythological origin.	Etymology uncertain, but there are several suggestions, such as derivation from OE grindan ("grind", i.e. "destroy"), OE *grandor ("evil", "injury"), OE grindel ("bar", "bolt"), ON grindill ("storm"), Latin grandis (with -ila suffix), *grandil- ("sand bottom"), or that both Grendel and Grettir derive from the root *grandi-.	A monster that lives underwater who visits king Hrothgar's hall every night to steal a man, until the Geatish hero Beowulf arrives. First he kills Grendel's mother and then he cuts off Grendel's head. A similar story can be found in Grettis saga Ásmundarsonar (c. 1300) and in Samsons saga fagra (14th c.), although the monster is not named Grendel. There are also cognate stories in Hrólfs saga kraka, where Beowulf's cognate Bödvar Bjarki slays a troll that terrorizes the Danish court (but this account has been contaminated by Beowulf's fight with the dragon), in Gesta Danorum where he kills a bear, and in Bjarkarímur where he slays two beasts, a wolf and a bear.	Beowulf	A similar battle with a monster is depicted in Grettis saga Ásmundarsonar, and there are also similarities in other Scandinavian sources.	
Grendel's mother	Old English: Grendel	Possibly of mythological origin.	See Grendel.	See Grendel.	Beowulf		
Grettir the Twisted	Old Norse: Grettir rangi, Latin: Gretir Iniquus		de Vries derives the name from grenja which means "to howl".	He appears at the massive Battle of Brávellir as one of the Swedish king Sigurd Ring's warriors in the battle against the Danish king Harald Wartooth. He was one of the archers sent from Telemark, and the Swedes expected little from these archers that they held to be slow speaking drawlers. In Gesta Danorum, the archers are described a brave but humble. Seeing Ubbi having killed 25 champions and wounded 11 among the Swedes and the Geats, Haddir, Roald and Grettir stopped the massacre by showering the warrior with arrows and he died having been riddled with 144 arrows, an event that turned the battle against the Danes.		Sögubrot, Gesta Danorum (VIII)	
Grim the Hardy	Old Norse: Grímr Harðskafi, Grímr Þorkelsson		Grímr means "mask", but it may have been conflated with grimmr meaning "cruel".	He is mentioned in the eddic poem Hyndluljóð as Grim the Hardy, together with his fellow housecarls Thorir Iron-Shield, Gunnar Midwall, Ulf the Gaping, Brodd and Harvi. They are in the service of king Hrolf the Old. The legends of Grim and Thorir, the housecarls of Hrolf, are told in the saga Hrólfs saga Gautrekssonar. The Geatish hing Hrólf meets Grim in England, where he is accepted into Hrolf's service on condition that he gives up courting a young girl who is her mother's only support. He takes part in Hrolfs expedition to Ireland and is taken captive with him, as the Swedes are greatly outnumbered, but they are later saved by Hrolf's wife Thornbjörg the Shield-maiden. In the end he marries and settles down, and stay friends with his former liege.		Hrólfs saga Gautrekssonar, Hyndluljóð	
Grima	Old Norse: Gríma		The name means "mask".	The wife of Áki^{2}, a poor farmer. She advises her husband to kill Heimir^{2} to take his precious harp. When they discover that Aslaug^{1} is inside, she advises Áki^{2} to adopt the girl, whom they call Kráka. When she leaves them to live with Ragnar Lodbrok, she tells them that she knows that they murdered Heimir and curses them to live having each day a worse one than the previous one until they die.		Ragnars saga loðbrókar	
Grime and Hilde	Middle High German: Grîme or Middle High German: Grîne, Middle High German: Hilde, Old Norse: Grímur and Old Norse: Hilldur	The figures appear to have been invented to explain the name of Dietrich von Bern's helmet, Hildegrim ("battle-mask").	For the etymology of Grime, see Grima. For the etymology of Hilde, see Hildr^{1}	A giant couple; Dietrich von Bern acquires his helmet Hildegrim from Grime and his wife Hilde. The story is told in retrospect in the Eckenlied and Sigenot, but is narrated in full in the Þiðreks saga.			Þiðreks saga, Eckenlied, Sigenot
Grimhild/Ute^{1}	Old Norse: Grimhildr or Oda (Þiðreks saga), Middle High German: Uote	Name of Uote may derive from Oda, wife of Liudolf, Duke of Saxony, died 913.	For "Grimhild", see Gudrun/Kriemhild. Uote from a Low German *Ōda, from *ot- ("wealth"), thus "one with wealth"	Grimhild/Ute is the mother of the Burgundian kings. In the Norse tradition, she is the mother of Gunnar, Gudrun, Gutthorm^{1}, and Hagen/Högni^{1}. In the German tradition, she is the mother of the brothers Gunnar, Giselher, Gernot, and Kriemhild, as well as the sister of Bishop Pilgrim of Passau. In the Þiðreks saga, she is the mother of Hagen/Högni^{1} by a demon. She also appears in several eddic poems. In the Völsunga saga, she is skilled at magic and successfully conspires to have Sigurd marry her daughter Gudrun. She gives Sigurd a potion so that he forgets his love Brynhild, and then she shows Sigurd and Gunnar how to switch shapes, so that Sigurd can win Brynhild for Gunnar. When the ruse has been revealed, she is the main force behind making Gutthorm^{1} murder Sigurd, and when Gudrun mourns her husband, Grimhild gives her a potion so she forgets her sorrow and marries Atli (Attila). The only one who sees through her is Brynhild. In the Nibelungenlied, Ute, who is also the sister of Bishop Pilgrim of Passau, who interprets Kriemhild's dream in which two eagles kill a tame falcon as an omen of the death of Kriemhild's future husband. She warns Gunther not to accept Attila's invitation, recounting a dream in which all the birds in the country die, but her advice is discarded.		Grípisspá, Guðrúnarkviða II, Oddrúnargrátr, Atlamál, Skáldskaparmál, Völsunga saga	Nibelungenlied, Þiðreks saga
Grímr, Eygrímr	Old Norse: Grímr		Grímr means "mask", but it may have been conflated with grimmr meaning "cruel". Ey- is from PN *awjō ("island"), *auja ("happiness", "luck") or *aiwa ("ever").	In the U-version of Hervarar saga, Starkad, son of Stórvirkr, is a descendant of giants and he has eight arms. He is betrothed to Ogn álfasprengi. One day when he returned from Élivágar, Hergrímr had abducted his fiancée. Hergrímr has the son Grímr with her before Starkad finds him and challenges him to a holmgang. Starkad fights with four swords at once and kills him, and when Ogn sees Hergrímr die, she kills herself rather than return to Starkad. The latter takes all the riches Hergrímr owned and also his son and raises him as his own. Starkad later kidnaps Alfhild^{3}, the daughter of king Alf of Alfheimr, when she is performing the Disablot to the Disir. King Alf calls on Thor who kills Starkad and liberates Alfhild^{3}, who returns home with Hergrím's son Grímr. During the abduction she bore Starkad a daughter named Bauggerðr who marries Grímr. When Grímr is 12 years old and has come of age, he becomes a great warrior. He later finds the island Bólm which in the U-version of the Hervarar saga is in Hålogaland, and there he settles down and has the son Arngrim, the berserker.		Hervarar saga (U)	
Grípir	Old Norse: Grípir		ON for "gripper".	Sigurd's maternal uncle; he reluctantly prophecies Sigurd's future.		Grípisspá, Völsunga saga	
Guðere	Old English: Gūðere		The first element gūð- means "battle", "war" and "fight", see Guðlaf, below. The second element -ere is here ("army")	A Frisian warrior mentioned in the Finnsburg Fragment, line 18.	Finnsburg Fragment		
Guðlaf	Old English: Gūðlāf, Latin: Gunnleifus		The name is from PN *Gunþilaibaz where the first element is *gunþi which means "battle", and the second element is *-laibaz which means "descendant" or "heir".	Guthlaf appears in the Finnsburg Fragment and in Beowulf, as one of Hengest's men. The second conflict with the Frisians starts because he and Oslaf publicly express their shame to Hengest. He may have been the brother of Oslaf and Hunlaf, and the three appear in a list of six or seven sons of a Danish king Leifus in the Skjöldunga saga. In the fragment, a Guthlaf is mentioned as the father of Garulf, on the other side of the conflict. This has been interpreted as father and son fighting on opposing sides, like Hadubrand and Hildebrand^{1}, as a coincidence, or as a scribal error where Garulf's father was originally named Guthulf.	Finnsburg Fragment, Beowulf	Skjöldunga saga	
Guðlaugr	Old Norse: Guðlaugr		From ON guð- meaning "god" and laugr which means "promised to" or "initiated to" from PGmc -*lauʒ, related to Gothic liugan "give a sacred vow" or "to marry".	Guðlaugr was a king of Hålogaland who was captured while he was raiding in Denmark by the Swedish princes Jorund and Eric^{2}. They took him ashore and hanged him, and afterwards his men raised a barrow over him.		Ynglingatal (12), Ynglinga saga (23), Háleygjatal (4 and 7)	
Gudmund^{1}	Old Norse: Guðmundr		From ON for "God" and "protection".	In the Gesta Danorum, a king of a kingdom called Glasisvellir.		Gesta Danorum, Hervarar saga	
Gudmund^{2}	Old Norse: Guðmundr		See Gudmund.^{1}	In the Helgi material, he is a son of Granmar and brother of Hothbrodd. The lays have also added the hero Starkad as a third son. He dies in battle against the Völsungs. He engages in a flyting with Sinfjötli in Helgakviða Hundingsbana I, Helgakviða Hundingsbana II, but in the Völsunga saga, he is either erroneously called Granmar which was the name of his father, or it is his father Granmar who takes his place.		Helgakviða Hundingsbana I, Helgakviða Hundingsbana II, Völsunga saga, Norna-Gests þáttr	
Gudrød Olafsson	Old Norse: Guðrøðr		The first element Guð- is from PGmc *guða meaning "god" or "divine being, while the second element is (f)røðr from PN *friþuʀ meaning "love" and "peace".	In Ragnarssona þáttr, Gudrød Olafsson belonged to the Dagling line, and fell in battle where Arnulf of Carinthia slaughtered 100 000 Danes and Norwegians including Sigurd Snake-in-the-Eye (historically the Battle of Leuven in 891). His brother Helgi the Sharp^{2} managed to escape and informed Sigurd's mother Aslaug^{1} of her son's death and stayed with her to defend her country, since Sigurd's son Horda-Knut was too young. Helgi married Horda-Knut's twin sister Aslaug^{2} and they had the son Sigurd Hart.		Ragnarssona þáttr	
Guðröðr of Skåne	Old Norse: Guðrøðr		See Gudrød Olafsson.	Guðröðr was the king of Scania. The Ynglinga saga tells that Guðröðr married Åsa^{1}, the daughter of the Swedish king Ingjald Ill-ruler. She slandered his brother Halfdan the Valiant so that Guðröðr killed him, and having done so, she arranged the death of Guðröðr himself. Then she fled back to her father in Sweden.		Ynglinga saga, Sögubrot	
Gudrød the Hunter (or the "munificent")	Old Norse: Guðrøðr veiðikonungr, Old Norse: Guðrøðr gǫfugláti		See Gudrød Olafsson.	He was the son of Halfdan the Mild and took over his kingdom when he died. He married Alfhild^{4}, the daughter of king Alfarinn^{1} of Alfheim, and with her he was given half of Vingulmark. They had the son Olaf Geirstad-Alf. When Alfhild died he sent his warriors westwards to Agder and asked for the hand of Åsa^{2}, the daughter of king Harald Read-Beard, but the king refused. Hearing about the refusal, Gudrød summoned his men and sailed for Agder where they caught Harald Read-Beard by surprise during the night at his hall. Both Harald and his son Gyrðr fell. Guðrøðr took much booty, including Harald's daughter Åsa^{2}, and with her, he had the son Halfdan the Black. When the son was one year old, Guðrøðr travelled and feasted at banquets, and one evening when he was very drunk and stepped off his ship, a man ran up to him as he reached the end of the gangway and ran a spear through him. It was one of queen Åsa^{2}'s servants and she made no secret of being behind the murder. The Historia Norwegiæ and Ynglingatal only report that she betrayed her husband by making a young man stab him to death.		Íslendingabók, Ynglingatal, Af Upplendinga konungum, Historia Norwegiæ, Ynglinga saga, Þáttr Ólafs Geirstaða álfs	
Gudrun/Kriemhild	Old Norse: Guðrún or Grimilldr (in Þiðreks saga), Middle High German: Kriemhilt.	Role as Atli/Etzel's wife likely from Ildiko, role as Sigurd/Siegfried's wife likely from Fredegund, however the character in German legend shows similarities to Fredegund's opponent, the historical Brunhilda of Austrasia.	"Guðrun" from PGmc *Gunþrūn, first element PGmc *gunþ- ("battle"), second element a word akin to Old Norse rún- ("secret"). First syllable of Kriemhild of unknown meaning, second syllable from PGmc *hildjō- ("strife, conflict")	Sister of Gunther/Gunnarr and his brothers, wife of Sigurd/Siegfried. In the Norse tradition, mother of Svanhildr and Jonakr's sons. In the Nibelungenlied, she marries Siegfried/Sigurd and later quarrels with Brunhild, his brother's wife, claiming that Siegfried deflowered her. This precipitates Siegfried's murder. She reconciles with her brothers, but after remarrying to Attila, she contrives to take revenge on them by having them destroyed, killing Siegfried's murderer Hagen/Högni herself before Hildebrand^{1} kills her in outrage. In the Rosengarten zu Worms, she arranges for a massive tournament between Dietrich von Bern's heroes and Siegfried and the Burgundians, which Dietrich's heroes win. In the Lied vom Hürnen Seyfrid, Siegfried rescues her from a dragon who has kidnapped her. The Þiðreks saga portrays her as wishing to acquire Sigurd's gold in arranging for her brothers' deaths with Attila's connivance. She is killed by Dietrich von Bern when he sees her pushing lighted firebrands into her brother's mouths to make sure they are dead. In Norse tradition, Gudrun and Brunhild quarrel while bathing, precipitating Sigurd's murder. She is then married to Attila, and when the latter kills her brothers, she avenges them by killing Attila's sons and feeding their hearts to him, then killing him and burning down the Huns' hall. She is later married to Jonakr and has more children. When her daughter Svanhildr is killed by her husband Ermanaric, she urges her sons to avenge her.		Brot af Sigurðarkviðu, Guðrúnarkviða I, Sigurðarkviða hin skamma, Dráp Niflunga, Guðrúnarkviða II, Guðrúnarkviða III, Oddrúnargrátr, Atlakviða, Atlamál, Guðrúnarhvöt, Hamðismál, Skáldskaparmál, Völsunga saga, Norna-Gests þáttr	Nibelungenlied, Þiðreks saga, Rosengarten zu Worms, Heldenbuch-Prosa
Gudthorm^{1}				See Gernot/Guthormr (for the character in the Nibelung/Völsung tradition)			
Gudthorm^{2}	Old Norse: Guðþormr		See Gernot/Guthormr	In Ragnarssona þáttr and Hálfdanar saga svarta, Gudthorm is the son of Sigurd Hart and Ingibjorg, the daughter of Harald Klak. He also has a sister named Ragnhild. Haki a berserker from Hadeland killed their father, while he was out hunting. Then he went to their home in Ringerike and captured Raghnild and Gutthorm^{2}. He intended to marry the 15-year-old girl but being severely wounded the wedding was postponed. In the winter, Halfdan the Black came and took Ragnhild and Gutthorm^{2} and set fire to Haki's hall killing his men. Haki survived and pursued them until he came to lake Mjøsa, where he committed suicide by falling on his own sword.		Ragnarssona þáttr, Hálfdanar saga svarta	
Gullrönd	Old Norse: Gullrǫnd	An invention of the poet of Guðrúnarkviða I.	The name means "gold shield", from gull ("gold") and rǫnd ("shield").	Gudrun's sister, who tries to comfort her after the death of Sigurd; she unveils Sigurd's corpse to Gudrun so that she can grieve. She also argues with Brunhild.		Guðrúnarkviða I	
Gunther/Gunnar^{1}	Old English: Guðhere, Latin: Guntharius, Old Norse: Gunnarr, Middle High German: Gunthere	Gundaharius, king of the Burgundians, died 437.	First element PGmc *gunð- ("war, battle"), second hari- ("army").	King of the Burgundians. Son of Gjuki and brother of Gudrun/Kriemhild, husband of Brunhild. In the Norse tradition, brother of Högni. In the continental tradition, brother of Giselher and Gernot. In Waltharius, Gunther is greedy for the Hunnish gold that Walter of Aquitaine has with him; he rejects Walter's offer of a hundred rings and attacks him, resulting in his losing a leg. In the Nibelungenlied, Gunther relies on Sigurd/Siegfried's help to marry Brunhild, in exchange for which Siegfried marries Gunther's sister Kriemhild. When Brunhild and Kriemhild quarrel, Hagen/Högni convinces him to have Siegfried killed. After Kriemhild marries Attila, Gunther ignores warnings and goes to visit her. He is captured by Dietrich von Bern and Kriemhild has him beheaded. He plays a minor role in several other German epics. In the Norse tradition, Gunnarr and his brother Högni swear oaths of friendship with Sigurd, by at Brunhild's instigation inspire their half-brother Guthorm^{1} to kill him. Once Attila, married to his Sigurd's widow Gudrun, has invited them to steal their treasure, he fights valiantly but is captured. He refuses to tell Attila where the treasure is and is killed by Attila by being thrown into a snake pit.	Widsith, Waldere	Grípisspá, Brot af Sigurðarkviðu, Guðrúnarkviða I, Sigurðarkviða hin skamma, Dráp Niflunga, Atlakviða, Atlamál, Skáldskaparmál, Völsunga saga, Norna-Gests þáttr	Waltharius, Nibelungenlied, Þiðreks saga, Walther und Hildegund, Rosengarten zu Worms, Biterolf und Dietleib, Dietrichs Flucht, Rabenschlacht.
Gunther^{2}				See Sigmund Sigurdsson			
Gýlaugr	Old Norse: Gýlaugr		Peterson derives gý- from guð- meaning "god" and for laugr, see Guðlaugr, above.	According to the Ynglinga saga, Gýlaugr was the son of Guðlaugr, the king of Hålogaland who had been captured and hanged by the Swedish princes Jorund and Eric^{2}. He avenged his father by capturing Jorund at Oddesund in the Limfjord and hanging him. According to Historia Norwegiæ, this was done by Danes.		Ynglinga saga (24)	

== Sources ==
- Anderson, Carl Edlund (1999). Formation and Resolution of Ideological Contrast in the Early History of Scandinavia (PDF) (Thesis). University of Cambridge.
- Ayres, Henry Morgan (1917). "The Tragedy of Hengest in "Beowulf"". The Journal of English and Germanic Philology. 16 (2): 282–295. JSTOR 27700808.
- Stories and Ballads of the Far Past. Translated by Chadwick, Nora Kershaw. Cambridge at the University Press. 1921.
- Byock, Jesse (1999). The Saga of King Hrolf Kraki. Penguin Classics. ISBN 014043593X.
- Chambers, Robert W. (1921). Beowulf. Cambridge : The University press.
- Clarke, M. G. (1911). Sidelights on Teutonic History During the Migration Period, being Studies of Beowulf and Other Old English Poems. Cambridge University Press.
- Cleasby, Richard; Vigfússon, Gudbrand (1874). An Icelandic-English dictionary. Oxford Clarendon Press.
- Enright, Michael J. (1996). Lady with a Mead Cup. Four Courts Press. ISBN 1-85182-188-0.
- Evans, Jonathan D. M. (2016). "Hrólfs Saga kraka". In Pulsiano, Philip; Wolf, Kirsten (eds.). Medieval Scandinavia, an Encyclopedia. New York: Routledge Revivals. pp. 304–305. ISBN 978-1-315-16132-7.
- Heimskringla (PDF). Vol. 1. Translated by Finlay, Alison; Faulkes, Anthony. Viking Society for Northern Research, University College London. 2016. ISBN 978-0-903521-86-4.
- The Saga of the Volsungs (PDF). Translated by Finch, R. G. London and Edinburgh: Nelson. 1965.
- Friis-Jensen, Karsten, ed. (2015). Saxo Grammaticus Gesta Danorum, The History of the Danes. Vol. 1. Translated by Fisher, Peter. Oxford University Press. ISBN 978-0-19-82052-34.
- Förstemann, Ernst (1900). Altdeutsches Namenbuch, Band 1: Personennamen (2 ed.). Bonn: München, W. Fink; Hildesheim, Gg. Olms.
- Peters, Edward, ed. (1974). Paul the Deacon: History of the Lombards. Translated by Foulke, William Dudley. Philadelphia: University of Pennsylvania Press. ISBN 0-8122-1079-4.
- Gentry, Francis G.; McConnell, Winder; Müller, Ulrich; Wunderlich, Werner, eds. (2011) [2002]. The Nibelungen Tradition. An Encyclopedia. New York, Abingdon: Routledge. ISBN 978-0-8153-1785-2.
- Gillespie, George T. (1973). Catalogue of Persons Named in German Heroic Literature, 700-1600: Including Named Animals and Objects and Ethnic Names. Oxford: Oxford University. ISBN 978-0-19-815718-2.
- Gwara, Scott (2008). "The Foreign Beowulf and the "Fight at Finnsburh"". In Gentry, Francis G. (ed.). Heroic Identity in the World of Beowulf. Vol. 2. Leiden, Boston: Brill. pp. 135–180. ISBN 978-90-04-17170-1.
- Harris, Joseph (2016). "Grottasǫngr". In Pulsiano, Philip; Wolf, Kirsten (eds.). Medieval Scandinavia, an Encyclopedia. New York: Routledge Revivals. pp. 244–245. ISBN 978-1-315-16132-7.
- The Poetic Edda. Translated by Hollander, Lee M. Texas University Press. 1928.
- Jochens, Jenny (1996). Mazo Karras, Ruth; Peters, Edward (eds.). Old Norse Images of Women. Philadelphia: University of Pennsylvania Press. ISBN 0-8122-3358-1.
- De Gamle Eddadigte. Translated by Jónsson, Finnur. G. E. C. Gats forlag, København. 1932.
- Kaufmann, Hennig (1968). Ergänzungsband zu Ernst Förstemann: Personennamen. Wilhelm Fink.
- Kazanski, Michel (1991). Les Goths (Ier-VIIe s. ap. J.C.). Paris, Errance. ISBN 2-87772-062-4.
- Klaeber, Friedrich (2008). Fulk, R.D.; Bjork, Robert E.; Niles, John D. (eds.). Klaeber's Beowulf and The Fight at Finnsburg. University of Toronto Press. pp. 274–277. ISBN 978-0-8020-9843-6.
- Kightley, Michael R. (2016). "The Brothers of Beowulf : Fraternal Tensions and the Reticent Style". ELH. 83 (2): 407–429. doi:10.1353/elh.2016.0015. S2CID 164186249.
- Krause, Arnulf (2010). Reclams Lexikon der germanischen Mythologie und Heldensage. Reclam. ISBN 978-3-15-010778-2.
- Phelpstead, Carl, ed. (2001). A History of Norway and the Passion and Miracles of the Blessed Óláfr (PDF). Translated by Kunin, Devra. Viking Society for Northern Research. ISBN 978-0-903521-48-2.
- Larsson, Mats G. (2004). "Götarnas riken". Upptäcktsfärder till Sveriges enande. Atlantis, Stockholm. pp. 179–170. ISBN 9789173535182.
- Lincoln, Bruce (2014). Between History and Myth, Stories of Harald Fairhair and the Founding of the State. Chicago and London: The University of Chicago Press. ISBN 978-0-226-14092-6.
- Lombardi, Maria Cristina (2009). Ney, Agneta; Williams, Henrik; Charpentier Ljungqvist, Fredrik (eds.). "The Gutnic runkalender and the ancient system of time calculus". Á austrvega, Saga and East Scandinavia. 2. Gävle: Gävle University Press: 611–619. ISBN 978-91-978329-0-8.
- Malone, Kemp (1930). "Ingeld". Modern Philology. 27 (3): 257–276. doi:10.1086/387833. S2CID 224833211.
- Malone, Kemp (1933). Deor. London: Methuen & Co Ltd.
- Malone, Kemp (1936). Widsith (1962 ed.). Rosenkilde and Bagger, Copenhagen.
- Malone, Kemp (1923). The Literary History of Hamlet (1964 ed.). New York: Haskell House.
- Miller, Clarence H. (2007). "Fragments of Danish History". ANQ: A Quarterly Journal of Short Articles, Notes and Reviews. 20 (3): 9–22. doi:10.3200/ANQQ.20.3.9-22. S2CID 161363696.
- Mueller, Eugen Hartmuth (1939). "Deutung einiger Namen im Nibelungenlied". Monatshefte für Deutschen Unterricht. 31 (6): 274–284. JSTOR 30169580.
- Munch, Victor (1926). Norse Mythology, Legends of Gods and Heroes. New York: The American-Scandinavian Foundation.
- Naumann, Hans-Peter (2016). "Hrólfs saga Gautrekssonar". In Pulsiano, Philip; Wolf, Kirsten (eds.). Medieval Scandinavia, an Encyclopedia. New York: Routledge Revivals. pp. 303–304. ISBN 978-1-315-16132-7.
- Nedoma, Robert; Anton, Hans H. (1998). "Gibichungen". In Beck, Heinrich; Geuenich, Dieter; Steuer, Heiko (eds.). Reallexikon der Germanischen Altertumskunde. Vol. 12. New York/Berlin: de Gruyter. pp. 66–69.
- Neidorf, Leonard (2018a). "Beowulf as Pre-National Epic: Ethnocentrism in the Poem and its Criticism". ELH. 85 (4): 847–875. doi:10.1353/elh.2018.0031. S2CID 165792664.
- Neidorf, Leonard (2019a). "Garulf and Guthlaf in the Finnsburg Fragment". Notes and Queries. 66 (4): 489–492. doi:10.1093/notesj/gjz114.
- Nerman, Birger (1919). "Kung Agne och hans död på Agnefit". Fornvännen.
- Nerman, Birger (1925). Svenska rikets uppkomst. Stockholm: Generalstabens litografiska anstalt.
- Olrik, Axel (1919). The Heroic Legends of Denmark. Translated by Hollander, Lee M. New York: The American-Scandinavian Foundation.
- Olson, Oscar Ludvig (1916). "The Relation of the Hrólfs saga kraka and the Bjarkarímur to Beowulf". Publications of the Society for the Advancement of Scandinavian Study. 3 (1): 1–104. JSTOR 40914974.
- Orchard, Andy (1997). Dictionary of Norse Myth and Legend. Cassel. ISBN 0-304-34520-2.
- Orel, Vladimir E. (2003). A Handbook of Germanic Etymology. Brill. ISBN 978-90-04-12875-0.
- Hrolf Gautreksson. Translated by Pálsson, Hermann; Edwards, Paul. Southside. 1972. ISBN 0-8020-1814-9.
- Seven Viking Romances. Translated by Pálsson, Hermann; Edwards, Paul. Penguin Books. 1985. ISBN 0140444742.
- Peterson, Lena (2004). Lexikon över urnordiska personnamn. Uppsala: Institutet för språk och folkminnen.
- Peterson, Lena (2007). Nordiskt runnamnslexikon. Uppsala: Institutet för språk och folkminnen.
- Pritsak, Omeljan (1981). The origin of Rus'. Harvard University Press. pp. 188–225.
- Schück, Henrik; Warburg, Karl (1985). Illustrerad svensk litteraturhistoria. Vol. 1 (3 ed.). Malmö: Gidlunds. ISBN 91-7844-027-0.
- Schütte, Gudmund (1912). "The Geats of Beowulf". The Journal of English and Germanic Philology. 11 (4): 574–602. JSTOR 27700194.
- Shippey, Tom (2007). Honegger, Thomas (ed.). Roots and Branches, Selected Papers on Tolkien. Walking Tree Publishers. ISBN 978-3-905703-05-4.
- Simek, Rudolf (1993). Dictionary of Northern Mythology. Translated by Hall; Angela. D. S. Brewer. ISBN 0-85991-369-4.
- Sturtevant, Albert Morey (1949). "Etymologies of Old Norse Proper Names Used as Poetic Designations". Modern Language Notes. 64 (7): 486–490. doi:10.2307/2910019. JSTOR 2910019.
- The Saga of King Heidrek the Wise (PDF). Translated by Tolkien, Christopher. 1960.
- Uecker, Heiko (1972). Germanische Heldensage. Stuttgart: Metzler. ISBN 3476101061.
- Vermeyden, Paula (2016). "Gautreks saga". In Pulsiano, Philip; Wolf, Kirsten (eds.). Medieval Scandinavia, an Encyclopedia. New York: Routledge Revivals. pp. 224–225. ISBN 978-1-315-16132-7.
- de Vries, Jan (1962). Altnordisches Etymologisches Worterbuch (2000 ed.). Brill. ISBN 90-04-05436-7.
- de Vries, Jan (1970). Altgermanische Religionsgeschichte, Bd.2, Die Götter, Vorstellungen über den Kosmos, Der Untergang des Heidentums. de Gruyter, Berlin. ISBN 978-3110028072.
- The Sagas of Ragnar Lodbrok. Translated by Waggoner, Ben. New Haven: Troth Publications. 2009.
- Wessén, Elias (1927). "Eddadikterna om Helge Hundingsbane". Fornvännen.
- Wessén, Elias (1952). Wessén, Elias; Helgason, Jón; Knudsen, Trygve; Skautrup, Peter (eds.). Ynglingsaga. Svenska bokförlaget Norstedts, Stockholm; Ejnar Munksgaard, København; Dreyers forlag, Oslo.
- Westrin, Th. (1908). "Gautvid". In Westrin, Th. (ed.). Nordisk Familjebok. Vol. 9 (2 ed.). p. 802.
