= Harald the Old =

Harald Valdarsson, also known as Harald the Old (Old Norse: Haraldr inn gamli, born circa 568) appears only by name in Hversu Noregr byggðist, but his father, sons and descendants played a central role in the politics of Scandinavian legends.

== Hversu Noregr byggðist ==
Hversu Noregr byggðist tells that he was the son of Valdar, who was the son of Hróarr (i.e. king Hroðgar of Beowulf), and Harald was the father of Halfdan the Valiant and the grandfather of Ivar Vidfamne.

== Skjöldunga saga ==
Skjöldunga saga tells that the same Valdar (i.e. Harald's father) disputed that Rörek, the cousin of Hróarr (Hroðgar) should succeed Hrólfr Kraki (Hroðulf) as the king of the Daner. After the war, Rörek took Zealand, while Valdar took Scania.

== Ynglinga saga ==
In his Ynglinga saga, Snorri Sturluson wrote that Harald's son Halfdan the Valiant was the father of Ivar Vidfamne. Halfdan's brother was king Guðröðr of Scania. Guðröðr married Åsa, the daughter of the Swedish king Ingjald illråde (Ill-ruler) and she prodded Guðröðr to murder Halfdan. She was said to later cause Guðröðr's death as well, and fled to her father's protection. Afterwards, people called her Åsa Ill-ruler like her father Ingjald.

Halfdan's son Ivar Vidfamne mustered a large army and besieged Ingjald and his daughter at Ræning, whereupon the two committed suicide by burning themselves to death inside the hall.

== Hervarar saga ==
Whereas Hversu and Ynglinga saga have no information about Halfdan's mother (who was presumably Harald's wife), Hervarar saga provides the information that she was Hild, the daughter of the Gothic king Heiðrekr Ulfhamr, the son of Angantyr who defeated the Huns.

It then tells that Halfdan's son Ivar Vidfamne attacked Ingjald Ill-ruler, which led to Ingjald's suicide by burning down his own hall at Ræning together with all his retinue. After this, Ivar Vidfamne conquered Sweden.

Legendary titles
Preceded by Valdar	King of Scania	Succeeded by Guðröðr
