= Gauthildr Algautsdóttir =

Semi-legendary Swedish queen

Gauthildr Algautsdóttir (Swedish: Göthild Algotsdotter) (7th century), according to the Heimskringla, was the daughter of the Geatish king Algaut and the wife of Ingjald Illready, a semi-legendary king of Sweden. She was the mother of Olof Trätälja, the last Yngling ruler of Sweden and Åsa who married Gudröd, a legendary king of Skåne.

== See also ==
- Geatland
- Geats
- Gauthildr Alfsdóttir

== Sources ==
- Ynglinga saga
