= Guðröðr of Scania =

Guðröðr was a legendary Scanian king (perhaps 7th century) who, according to the Ynglinga saga, was the brother of Halfdan the Valiant, Ivar Vidfamne's father. He is only known from late Icelandic sources dating from the 13th century.

== The fratricide of Guðröðr ==
Denmark was, according to the late sagas, divided for a period between two branches of the Scylding dynasty, with one lineage residing in Zealand and the other in Scania (Skåne). While nothing in particular is told about the reign of Guðröðr, his brother Halfdan supposedly married an Anglian lady called Moald and obtained the lordship over Northumbria. The Ynglinga saga tells that Guðröðr married Åsa, the daughter of the Swedish king Ingjald Ill-ruler. She backtalked Halfdan so that Guðröðr killed him, and having done so, she arranged the death of Guðröðr himself. Then she fled back to her father in Sweden.

Guðröðr was succeeded by his nephew Ivar Vidfamne who avenged his father and uncle, and conquered Sweden. "He also took possession of all the realm of the Danes and a large part of Saxland and all of Austrríki and a fifth part of England. From his line are descended the kings of the Danes and the Swedes who have held supreme power there".

An episode in the fragmentary saga Sögubrot draws a parallel between Guðröðr and "Heimdall, who was the most foolish of the Aesir, though he was bad to [Ivar Vidfamne]", implying that he was compared unfavourably with his highly praised brother Halfdan.

== Guðröðr's family ==
Hervarar saga and Hversu Noregr byggdist give more information about his brother Halfdan the Valiant and his son Ivar Vidfamne, and by implication about Guðröðr himself.

Hversu Noregr byggdist gives Halfdan the Valiant's father as Harald the Old, his grandfather as Valdar and his great-grandfather as Hróarr (i.e. the Hroðgar of Beowulf).

Hervarar saga provides the information that Halfdan's mother was Hild, the daughter of the Gothic king Heiðrekr Ulfhamr, the son of Angantyr who defeated the Huns. Hversu Noregr byggdist instead alleges that the name of his mother was Hervor, daughter of Heiðrekr.

== Historical position ==
The story of a King Guðröðr who was killed at the instigation of his Queen Åsa is also found in a later section of the Ynglinga saga. The Vestfold ruler Gudrød the Hunter (9th century) met a similar fate at the hands of his queen Åsa Haraldsdottir of Agder, who ordered a servant to murder the king as revenge for the death of her father. This episode has moreover been compared with information in the Gesta Caroli Magni of Notker the Stammerer (c. 883), which says that the Danish King Gudfred (d. 810) was slayed on the instigation of his former queen. This connection has however been doubted by modern scholarship.

== Literature ==
- Åkerlund, Walter (1939) Studier i Ynglingatal. Lund: Vetenskapsocieteten i Lund.
- Ellehøj, Svend (1965) Studier over de ældste norrøne historieskrivning. Hafniæ: Munksgaard.
- Nerman, Birger (1925) Det svenska rikets uppkomst. Stockholm: Generalstabens litografiska anstalt.
- Saga Ólafs Konúngs Tryggvasonar, Vol. 1 (1825). Copenhagen: Popp.
- Snorri Sturluson (2016) Heimskringla, Vol. I. London: Viking Society for Northern Research.

Legendary titles
Preceded by Harald the Old	King of Skåne	Succeeded by Ivar Vidfamne
