= Valdar =

Legendary Danish king

Valdar was the name of several legendary Danish kings.

The Hervarar saga tells the tale of a Valdar who was viceroy of Denmark under Ivar Vidfamne and by Ivar's daughter Alfhild he was the father of Randver and of Harald Wartooth who was a legendary king of Denmark and Sweden.

The Skjöldunga saga and Hversu Noregr byggdist tell the tale of a Valdar who succeeded Hrólfr Kraki as King of Scania. This Valdar was the father of Harald the Old.

== Hervarar saga ==
The Hervarar saga tells that Ivar Vidfamne made Valdar the viceroy of Denmark and gave him his daughter Alfhild. When Valdar died, his son Randver became the king of Denmark, while his son Harald Wartooth became the king of Götaland or Gotland. In the Hervarar saga, the name Valdar also appears in an extract of the poem Hlöðskviða together with other kings and nations:

Ár kváðu Humla Húnum ráða, Gizur Gautum, Gotum Angantý, Valdarr Dönum, en Völum Kíarr, Alrekr inn frækni enskri þjóðu.	"Of old, goes the tale, did Humli rule the Huns Gizur the Geats Angantyr the Goths Valdar the Danes Caesar the Walha (Romans) and brave Alrek (possibly Alfred the Great) the English nation"

== Guðrúnarkviða II ==
Valdar is named as one of the Danes in Guðrúnarkviða II (stanza 19):

Valdarr Dönum með Jarizleifi, Eymóðr þriði með Jarizskári inn gengu þá jöfrum líkir; Langbarðs liðar, höfðu loða rauða, stuttar brynjur, steypða hjalma, skalmum gyrðir, höfðu skarar jarpar.

In this poem, Valdar is not explicitly identified as a king of the Danes, and the poem earlier mentions Guðrún visiting the "high hall of Hálfr" and staying in Denmark for seven seasons with Þóra, daughter of Hákon. Valdar appears after this, as part of the entourage of Guðrún's brothers Gunnar and Hogni, bringing her gifts to placate her after the death of Sigurðr. This story is also told in section 34 of Volsunga saga, in which the name Valdar is replaced with Valdamar, and Hálfr is explicitly referred to as king of Denmark.

== Hversu Noregr byggdist ==
According to Hversu Noregr byggdist, a Valdar was the son of Roar (Hroðgar) of the house of Skjöldung (Scylding). This source makes Valdar the father of Harald the Old, the father of Halfdan the Valiant, the father of Ivar Vidfamne. If he is of the same origin as the Valdar of Hervarar saga, this account adds four generations (Harald the Old, Halfdan the Valiant, Ivar Vidfamne and effectively Ivar's daughter Alfhild/Auðr who was Harald Wartooth's mother according to all accounts) between Valdar and Harald Wartooth, who was Valdar's son according to the Hervarar saga.

== Skjöldunga saga ==
The Skjöldunga saga tells that a Valdar disputed that Rörek, the cousin of Helgi (Halga) succeeded Hrólfr Kraki (Hroðulf) as the king of the Daner. After the war, Rörek took Zealand, while Valdar took Skåne. If based on the same tradition as Hversu Noregr byggdist, Valdar had the right to claim the throne being the son of the former king Hróarr (Hroðgar).

Legendary titles
Preceded by Ivar Vidfamne	Viceroy of Denmark	Succeeded by Randver
Preceded by Hrólfr Kraki	King of Scania	Succeeded by Harald the Old
