= Af Upplendinga konungum =

Norwegian tale

Af Upplendinga konunum is a short tale of the Norwegian part of the so-called Yngling. The saga consists of two short chapters in just over one book page, and is reproduced in Hauksbók. Af Upplendinga konunum does not exist in other manuscripts. The author is unknown, but he probably had a common source with Snorri Sturluson. At first sight, Af Upplendinga konunum looks like a simplified and shortened version of Snorri's far more famous Ynglinga Saga, but Snorri is not thought to be the source for the author of About Uplanders' kings. Rather, it seems that the Af Upplendinga konungum is somewhat older than Snorri's Ynglinga Saga.

== Summary ==
About Uplanders kings is about Yngling The kings of Olof Trätälja to Ragnvald Heidumhære. Olof Trätälja lived in Varmland, and his wife was the sister of silver Sølve the old one from Solør. Olav and silver had two sons, and one, Halfdan Hvitbeinn, became king in Solør after uncle Sølve. How came Yngling to Norway. Halfdan married Asa, daughter of Øystein Illråde from Hedmark. They had two sons, Gudrod and Øystein. Halfdan died in Toten and was buried in Hedmark. Half Dans son Gudrod was king in Hedmark father, while the other son, Øystein was king of Romerike. Øystein married the daughter of Eirik Agnarsson king of Vestfold, but died when he fell overboard on his ship. Øysteins son named Halfdan, and was called the gentle and food-stingy, because he gave his men a lot of gold, but starved them for food. Halfdan was married to Liv, daughter of King Dag from Vestmar. Halfdan died of illness in Vestfold, and was buried there. Half Dans son named Gudrod, and he was married to Åsa from Agder. They had son Halfdan. Asa got Gudrod killed because he had murdered Åsas father and brother Harald Gyrd. Earlier Gudrod married Alvhild and they had a son Olaf Geirstad-Alf. When Gudrod were killed, took Olav kingdom after his father. He ruled over Vestfold and Grenland, and he died on Geirstad and was buried there. Olav's son was Ragnvald Heidumhære, he was king in Grenland after his father. About him the poem Tjodolf of Hvin poem Ynglingatal, the kings who descended from Yngve-Frey in Sweden, and from his name were descendants called breedings.

== Other versions ==
We find other versions of the story in Af Upplendinga konunum in Snorri Yngling Saga, the first saga in the saga collection Heimskringla. This is much longer and it starts with Norse gods Odin and Frey and continues thirty generations until Ragnvald Heidumhære, while About Uplanders kings only covers seven generations. Another variation is found in Historia Norvegiæ. This covers an equally long period Yngling Saga, but is much easier and goes over scarce two sides. The version in Historia Norvegiæ is probably the oldest of the existing sources, while Yngling Saga is the youngest. In Ari fróði's Íslendingabók is also a variant in terms of sheer litany of ancestors from Yngve-Frey up until Are himself, who claimed to be Yngve-Freys descendant.

== Literature ==
- Hauksbok
- Islendingabok
- Historia Norvegiæ. In: Norges Historie, Historien om de gamle norske kongene, Historien om danenes ferd til Jerusalem. Translated by Astrid Salvesen, Aschehoug, Oslo 1990
- Krag, Claus: «Vestfold som utgangspunkt for den norske rikssamlingen». I: Collegium Medievale (3), 1990. s. 179-195
