= Hrothgar =

Legendary Danish king

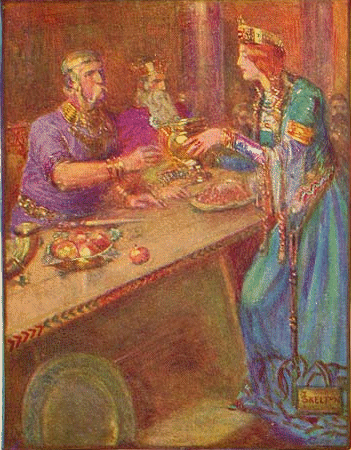
- Queen Wealhþeow serving Hrothgar (background, centre) and his men. Illustration from a 1908 children's book.

King of Denmark
- Predecessor: Halfdan
- Successor: Halga
- Died: 6th-century AD
- Spouse: Wealhþeow

Hrothgar (Old English: Hrōðgār [ˈr̥oːðɡɑːr]; Old Norse: Hróarr) was a semi-legendary Danish king living around the early sixth century AD.

Hrothgar appears in the Anglo-Saxon epics Beowulf and Widsith, in Norse sagas and poems, and in medieval Danish chronicles. In both Anglo-Saxon and Scandinavian tradition, Hrothgar is a Scylding, the son of Halfdan, the brother of Halga, and the uncle of Hrólfr Kraki. Moreover, in both traditions, the mentioned characters were the contemporaries of the Swedish king Eadgils; and both traditions also mention a feud with men named Fróði and Ingeld. The consensus view is that Anglo-Saxon and Scandinavian traditions describe the same person.

== Names ==
Hrothgar, also rendered Hrōðgār, is an Old English form attested in Beowulf and Widsith, the earliest sources to mention the character. In non-English sources, the name appears in more or less corresponding Old Icelandic, Old Danish, and Latinized versions. He appears as Hróarr, Hroar, etc., in sagas and poetry, and as Ro or Roe in the Danish Latin chronicles. The form Hrōðgār is thought to have derived from the proto-Norse *Hrōþigaizaz "famous spear", i.e. Roger. The corresponding Old Norse name Hróarr and its variations are derived from *Hrōþigaizaz, and from the very close names *Hrōþiwarjaz "famous defender" or *Hrōþiharjaz "famous warrior".

== Anglo-Saxon poems ==
Hrothgar appears in two Anglo-Saxon poems, Beowulf and Widsith. Beowulf gives the fuller account of Hrothgar and how the Geatish hero Beowulf visited him to free his people from the trollish creature Grendel. Widsith only mentions Hrothgar, Heorot, his nephew Hroðulf and their enemy Ingeld, but can complete Beowulf in some cases where Beowulf does not give enough information. This is notably the case concerning the ending of his feud with Ingeld.

=== Beowulf ===
A mention of Hrothgar in Beowulf

In the epic poem Beowulf, Hrothgar is mentioned as the builder of the great hall Heorot and ruler of Denmark, when the Geatish hero Beowulf arrives to defeat the monster Grendel.

When Hrothgar is introduced in Beowulf, it is explained that he was the second of four children of King Healfdene: he had an older brother, Heorogar, who was king before him; a younger brother Halga; and a sister, who was married to the king of Sweden. The sister is not named in the manuscript and most scholars agree this is a scribal error, but suggested names are Signy and Yrsa. Friderich Kluge (1896) accordingly suggested that the line be restored as hyrde ic þ [Sigeneow wæs Sæw]elan cwen, rendering the Norse names in Old English forms. However, the only certain Swedish (Scylfing) royal name ending in -ela that has come down to us is Onela, and according to the rules of alliteration, this means that the queen's name must have begun with a vowel. Sophus Bugge consequently identified her with the Swedish queen Yrsa. He thus suggested the line should be emended to read hyrde ic þ[æt Ȳrse wæs On]elan cwen. Most 20th-century translators followed this suggestion. However, in Norse tradition, Yrsa was the daughter and lover/rape victim of Hrothgar's younger brother Halga, and the mother of Halga's son Hroðulf, and most modern translators simply leave the line as it is.

The poem further tells that Hrothgar was "slain in war" and so his kinsmen eagerly followed him. He is both honest and generous: "He broke no oaths, dealt out rings, treasures at his table". When Beowulf leads his men to Denmark, he speaks of Hrothgar to both a coast-guard and to Hrothgar's herald: he calls Hrothgar a "famed king", "famed warrior", and "protector of the Scyldings" (the ruling clan), and describes him as "old and good." The poet emphasizes that the Danes "did not find fault" with Hrothgar, "for that was a good King". When Beowulf defeats Grendel, Hrothgar rewards Beowulf and his men with great treasures, showing his gratitude and open-handedness. The poet says that Hrothgar is so generous that "no man could fault him, who wished to speak the truth."

Hrothgar was married to a woman named Wealhþeow, who was a Helming, probably defining her as a relative of Helm, the ruler of the Wulfings. When Hrothgar welcomes Beowulf, he recalls his friendship with Beowulf's family. He met Beowulf's father Ecgþeow "when I first ruled the Danes" after the death of Heorogar; he laments Heorogar's fall ("He was better than I!") and recalls how he settled Ecgþeow's blood feud with the Wulfings. Hrothgar thanks God for Beowulf's arrival and victory over Grendel, and swears to love Beowulf like a son.

The poem introduces Hroðulf (Hrólfr Kraki in Scandinavian sources) as Hrothgar's supporter and right-hand man; and we learn that Hroðulf is Hrothgar's nephew and that "each was true to the other". The common piece of information that Hrothgar's younger brother Halga is Hroðulf's father comes from Scandinavian sources (see below), where Halga was unaware that Yrsa was his own daughter and either raped or seduced her. Yrsa herself was tragically also the result of Halga raping a woman.

Wealhþeow has borne Hrothgar two sons, Hreðric and Hroðmund, and Hroðulf is to be regent if Hrothgar dies before his sons are grown. (Since Hrothgar is an old man at this time—he tells Beowulf he has been king for "fifty winters"—and Wealhþeow's two sons are not yet grown, it seems likely that Wealhþeow is much younger than Hrothgar, and may not be his first wife.)

Hrothgar is plunged into gloom and near-despair after Grendel's mother attacks the hall and kills Hrothgar's best friend and closest advisor; but when Beowulf advises him not to despair, and that "it is better to avenge our friends than to mourn overmuch", Hrothgar leaps to his feet and thanks God for Beowulf's wise words, and leads the Danes and Geats out to attack the small lake (mere) where Grendel's mother lives.

After Beowulf defeats Grendel's mother, Hrothgar rewards him again, and then preaches a sermon in which he warns Beowulf to beware of arrogance and forgetfulness of God.

Beowulf takes his leave of Hrothgar to return home, and Hrothgar embraces him and weeps that they will not meet again (because Hroðgar is a very old man). This is Hrothgar's last appearance in the poem. When Beowulf reports on his adventure to his lord Hygelac, he mentions that Hrothgar also had a daughter, Freawaru; it is not clear whether Freawaru was also the daughter of Wealhþeow or was born of an earlier marriage. Since the Danes were in conflict with the Heaðobards, whose king Froda had been killed in a war with the Danes, Hrothgar sent Freawaru to marry Froda's son Ingeld, in an unsuccessful attempt to end the feud.

Beowulf predicts to Hygelac that Ingeld will turn against his father-in-law Hrothgar. Earlier in the poem, the poet tells us that the hall Heorot was eventually destroyed by fire:

Beowulf 80–85	Gummere's 1910 verse
... | Sele hlīfade hēah and horn-gēap: | heaðo-wylma bād, lāðan līges; | ne wæs hit lenge þā gēn þæt se ecg-hete | āðum-swerian æfter wæl-nīðe | wæcnan scolde.	... there towered the hall, high, gabled wide, the hot surge waiting of furious flame. Nor far was that day when father and son-in-law stood in feud for warfare and hatred that woke again.

It is tempting to interpret the new war with Ingeld as leading to the burning of the hall of Heorot, but the poem separates the two events (by a ne wæs hit lenge þā meaning "nor far way was that day when", in Gummere's translation). According to Widsith (see below), Hrothgar and Hroðulf defeat Ingeld, and if Scandinavian tradition (see the more detailed discussion below) is to be trusted Hrothgar himself is killed by a relative, or by the king of Sweden, but he is avenged by his younger brother Halga. Halga dies in a Viking expedition; Hroðulf succeeds him and rises in fame, and according to Hroðulf's own saga and other sources, Hroðulf's cousin and/or brother-in-law Heoroweard slays Hroðulf (is this the event referred to as the burning of Heorot?). Heoroweard himself dies in that battle, and according to two sources, this happens only a few hours later, as an act of vengeance by a man loyal to Hroðulf, called Wigg. This is the kin-slaying end of the Scylding dynasty.

Family tree of the Scyldings (Kings of the Danes), Heathobards and Scylfings (Kings of the Swedes), according to Beowulf

♕ Heremod
♕ Scyld Scefing
♕ Beowulf
♕ Healfdene	♕ Ongentheow
♕ Heorogar	♕ Hrothgar	Wealhtheow	Halga	A daughter	♕ Onela	♕ Ohthere
Heoroweard	Hrethric	Hrothmund	Hrothulf	Froda	Eanmund	Eadgils
Freawaru	Ingeld

=== Widsith ===
Whereas Beowulf never dwells on the outcome of the battle with Ingeld, the possibly older poem Widsith refers to Hrothgar and Hroðulf defeating Ingeld at Heorot:

Hroþwulf ond Hroðgar heoldon lengest sibbe ætsomne suhtorfædran, siþþan hy forwræcon wicinga cynn ond Ingeldes ord forbigdan, forheowan æt Heorote Heaðobeardna þrym.	Hroðulf and Hroðgar held the longest peace together, uncle and nephew, since they repulsed the Viking-kin hewn at Heorot Heaðobard's army. and Ingeld to the spear-point made bow,

This piece suggests that the conflict between the Scyldings Hrothgar and Hroðulf on one side, and the Heaðobards Froda and Ingeld on the other, was well known in Anglo-Saxon England. This conflict also appears in Scandinavian sources, but in the Norse tradition the Heaðobards had apparently been forgotten and the conflict is instead rendered as a family feud (see Gesta Danorum, Hrólf Kraki's saga and Skjöldunga saga, below, for more information). The Norse sources also deal with the defeat of Ingeld and/or Froda.

== Scandinavian sources ==
Hrólf Kraki Tradition

Hrólf Kraki's saga
Ynglinga saga
Lejre Chronicle
Gesta Danorum
Beowulf
People
Hrólfr Kraki
Halfdan
Helgi
Yrsa
Adils
Áli
Bödvar Bjarki
Hjörvard
Roar
Locations
Lejre
Uppsala
Fyrisvellir

In the Scandinavian sources, consisting of Norse sagas, Icelandic poems and Danish chronicles, Hrothgar also appears as a Danish king of the Scylding dynasty. He remains the son of Healfdene and the elder brother of Halga. Moreover, he is still the uncle of Hroðulf. The Scandinavian sources also agree with Beowulf by making Hrothgar contemporary with the Swedish king Eadgils. These agreements with Beowulf are remarkable considering that these sources were composed from oral tradition 700 to 800 years after the events described, and 300 to 400 years later than Beowulf and Widsith.

There are also notable differences. The Heaðobards Ingeld and Froda also appear in Scandinavian tradition, but their tribe, the Heaðobards, had long been forgotten, and instead the tribal feud was rendered as a family feud. Their relationship as father and son had also been reversed in some sources, and so either Ingeld or Froda is given as the brother of Healfdene. Ingeld or Froda murdered Healfdene, but was himself killed in revenge by Hrothgar and Halga. Moreover, in Scandinavian tradition, Hrothgar is a minor character in comparison to his nephew Hroðulf. Such differences indicate that Beowulf and Scandinavian sources represent separate traditions.

The names of Hrothgar and others appear in the form they had in Old Icelandic or Latinized Old Danish at the time the stories were put to paper, and not in their Old English or more authentic Proto-Norse forms.

It has been a matter of some debate whether the hero Beowulf could have the same origin as Hroðulf's berserker Bödvar Bjarki, who appears in Scandinavian sources.

Among these sources, it is the most famous one, the Hrólfr Kraki's saga, which is most different from Beowulf, and a notable difference is that Hrothgar leaves the rule of Denmark to his younger brother Halga and moves to Northumbria. The focus is consequently on the Hrólfr Kraki's saga when a scholar questions the comparison of Hrothgar and other characters from Beowulf with counterparts in Scandinavian tradition. Scandinavian sources have added some information that appear in Beowulf studies, without having any founding in the work itself, such as the information that Halga was, or probably was, Hroðulf's father. Another example is the existence of a woman named Yrsa, who, however, has been transposed to a role she never had in any source texts, that of Hrothgar's sister.

=== Norse sagas and poems ===
In Icelandic sources, Hrothgar, Halga and Hroðulf appear under the Old Icelandic forms of their names; that is, as Hróarr, Helgi and Hrólfr, the last one with the epithet Kraki. In the case of the Skjöldunga saga ("Saga of the Scyldings") only a Latin summary has survived, and so their names are Latinized. The Icelandic sources can be divided into two groups: the Hrólfr Kraki's saga on the one hand, and the Skjöldunga saga and Bjarkarímur on the other. Both groups tell a version of Hrothgar and Halga's feud with Froda (Fróði) and Ingeld (Ingjaldr). However, whereas the Hrólfr Kraki's saga make Froda the brother of Healfdene, the Skjöldunga saga and Bjarkarímur make Ingeld the brother of Healfdene. Hrólfr Kraki's saga also disagrees with all the other works by moving Hrothgar from the throne of Denmark to Northumbria.

==== Hrólfr Kraki's saga ====
Hrólfr Kraki's saga relates that Halfdan has three children, Hróarr, Helgi, and the daughter Signý, who is married to Sævil Jarl. Halfdan has a brother named Fróði and both of them rule a kingdom, but Halfdan is good-natured and friendly, whereas Fróði is savage. Fróði attacks and kills Halfdan and makes himself the king of a united Denmark. He then sets out to neutralize his nephews Hróarr and Helgi. However, the two brothers survive on an island, protected by a man called Vivil; and after some adventure they avenge their father by killing Fróði.

Hróarr is presented as "meek and blithe", and he is completely removed from ruling the kingdom, leaving the rule to his brother Helgi. Instead he joins Norðri, the king of Northumberland, where he marries Ögn, the king's daughter. As recompense for Hróarr's share of the Danish kingdom, Helgi gives him a golden ring.

Sævil Jarl's son Hrókr (Hróarr and Helgi's nephew) becomes jealous that he has not inherited anything from his grandfather Halfdan; he goes to his uncle Helgi to claim his inheritance. Helgi refuses to give him a third of Denmark, and so instead he goes to Northumbria to claim the golden ring. He asks Hróarr if he at least could have a look at the ring, whereupon he takes the ring and throws it into the water. Hróarr naturally becomes angry, and cuts off Hrókr's feet and sends him back to his ships. Hrókr cannot live with this, and so he returns with a large army and slays Hróarr. Helgi avenges his brother by also cutting off Hrókr's arms. Hróarr's son Agnar retrieves the ring by diving in the water, which gives him great glory. Agnar is said to have become greater than his father, and much talked of in the old sagas.

Helgi attacks Sweden to retrieve Yrsa, his daughter and lover, but is killed by Aðils, the king of Sweden. He is succeeded by Hrólfr Kraki, his son by Yrsa.

Although it agrees with all the other Scandinavian sources in telling the story of Halga's incestuous relationship with his daughter Yrsa, it disagrees with all of them and with Beowulf by removing Hrothgar altogether as the king of Denmark. Instead, his place is taken by his brother Halga, and Hrothgar is sent to Northumberland, where he marries Ögn, the daughter of a positively fictive king Norðri who is named after Northumberland (Norðimbraland). Opinion is divided on whether there is any connection between Hrothgar's wife Wealhþeow in Beowulf and his wife Ögn in Hrólfr Kraki's saga; it has been suggested that Ögn shows that Wealhþeow and her family (the Helmings) were Anglo-Saxon. Another difference is that Hrothgar's sons Hreðric and Hroðmund do not appear in the Scandinavian tradition, but correspond to Agnar, in Hrólfr Kraki's saga.

The family tree of legendary Kings of the Danes, according to Hrólfs saga kraka

Kings of the Danes are marked with a crown (♕).

Sigríðr ♀	♕ Hálfdan ♂	♕ Fróði ♂	KEY
Marriage or coupling
Sævil jarl ♂	Signý ♀	Norðri, a King in England ♂	Ólöf, Queen of Saxland ♀	Parent and child
Hrókr ♂	Ögn ♀	♕ Hróarr ♂	♕ Helgi ♂	Yrsa ♀	Aðils, King of Sweden ♂	King of the Finns ♂	Ingibjörg ♀
Agnarr ♂	An elf-woman ♀	King Hring ♂	Hvít ♀
Hjörvarðr, a king ♂	♕ Skuld ♀	♕ Hrólfr Kraki ♂	Björn ♂	Bera, a farmer's daughter ♀
♕ Skúr ♀	♕ Drífa ♀	Böðvarr ♂	Elg-Fróði ♂	Þórir Houndsfoot ♂

The source used for the genealogical information is the English translation by Peter Tunstall, and spellings are from the Old Norse edition edited by Guðni Jónsson.

==== Skjöldunga saga and Bjarkarímur ====
The Skjöldunga saga and Bjarkarímur tell a similar version to that of the Hrólfr Kraki's saga, but with several striking differences. Ingeld (Ingjaldus) of Beowulf reappears, but it is Ingeld who is the father of Froda (Frodo), and unlike in Hrólf Kraki's saga, Ingeld takes Froda's place as the half-brother of Healfdene (Haldan).

The sources relate that Haldan has a half-brother named Ingjaldus and a queen Sigrith with whom he has three children: the sons Roas and Helgo and the daughter Signy.

Ingjaldus is jealous of his half-brother Haldan and so he attacks and kills him, and then marries Sigrith. Ingjaldus and Sigrith then have two sons named Rærecus and Frodo. Their half-sister Signy stays with her mother until she is married to Sævil, the jarl of Zealand. Ingjaldus, who is worried that his nephews will want revenge, tries to find them and kill them, but Roas and Helgo survive by hiding on an island near Skåne. When they are old enough, they avenge their father by killing Ingjaldus.

The two brothers both become kings of Denmark, and Roas marries the daughter of the king of England. When Helgo's son Rolfo (whom Helgo begat with his own daughter Yrsa) is eight years old, Helgo dies and Rolfo succeeds him. Not much later, Roas is killed by his half-brothers Rærecus and Frodo, whereupon Rolfo becomes the sole king of Denmark.

This version agrees with all other versions of the legend of Hrothgar (Roas) and Halga (Helgo) by making them sons of Healfdene (Haldan) and by presenting Hrothgar as the uncle of Hroðulf (Rolfo). It agrees with Beowulf and Hrólfr Kraki's saga by mentioning that they had a sister, and by dealing with their feud with Froda (Frodo) and Ingeld (Ingjaldus), although there is a role reversal by making Ingeld the father of Froda instead of the other way round. It agrees with the other Scandinavian versions by treating Halga's incestuous relationship with his own daughter Yrsa. Moreover, it agrees with all other versions, except for Hrólfr Kraki's saga, by presenting Hrothgar as a king of Denmark, although it agrees with Hrólfr Kraki's saga by marrying Hrothgar to an Anglo-Saxon woman. Another agreement with Hrólfr Kraki's saga is the information that their sister was married to a Sævil Jarl, and that they had to hide on an island fleeing their kin-slaying uncle, before they could kill him and avenge their father.

==== Hversu Noregr byggdist ====
The Old Norse genealogy work Hversu Noregr byggdist tells that Hróarr had a son named Valdar, the father of Harald the Old, the father of Halfdan the Valiant, the father of Ivar Vidfamne, who was the maternal grandfather of Harald Wartooth. Harald fell at the Battle of the Brávellir against his nephew Sigurd Hring, a king of Sweden and the father of Ragnar Lodbrok.

This account is not about presenting the life of Hrothgar, but in presenting how Harald Fairhair was descended from kings and heroes in Scandinavian legend. The only reason for assuming that Hróarr is the same as Hrothgar, the Scylding, is that only Hrothgar would be a personage of old so famous so as not to need any further identification than his name. However, the Skjöldunga saga tells that a Valdar disputed that Rörek, the cousin of Halga succeeded Hroðulf (Hrólfr Kraki) as the king of the Daner. After the war, Rörek took Zealand, while Valdar took Skåne. If based on the same tradition as Hversu Noregr byggdist, Valdar had the right to claim the throne being the son of the former king Hrothgar.

=== Danish medieval chronicles ===
In the Chronicon Lethrense, Annales Lundenses and Gesta Danorum (12th-century works of Danish history, written in Latin), King Hrothgar is mentioned by the Old Danish form of the name Ro or Roe. His father Healfdene appears as Haldan or Haldanus, while his brother Halga appears as Helghe or Helgo. Hroðulf appears with an epithet as Roluo Krage or Rolf Krage. Their Swedish enemy, King Eadgils, appears as Athislus or Athisl (the Chronicon Lethrense calls him Hakon.)

The only Danish work that retains traditions of the feud with Ingeld and Froda is the Gesta Danorum.

==== Chronicon Lethrense and Annales Lundenses ====
The Chronicon Lethrense and the included Annales Lundenses report that Ro and Helghe were the sons of Haldan, who died of old age. The two brothers shared the rule, Ro taking the land and Helghe the water. They also tell that Ro founded and gave his name to the market town of Roskilde and that he was buried in Lejre. However, before Ro's nephew Rolf Krage (Hroðulf), who was Helghe's son by his own daughter Yrse, could ascend the throne, the rule of Denmark was given to a dog, on the orders of the Swedish king Hakon/Athisl (that is, Eadgils).

The Chronicon Lethrense and the Annales Lundenses agree with Beowulf in presenting Hrothgar (Ro) and his brother Halga (Helghe) as the sons of Healfdene (Haldan). They do not, however, contain a character description as Beowulf does; nor do they mention his spouse or his children. However, they introduce a sharing of power between Hrothgar and Halga where Halga only had power over the fleet. Hrothgar is reported as founding the town of Roskilde, which coincides with the information in Beowulf that he built Heorot. The information that Hroðulf (Rolf) was the result of an incestuous relationship between Halga and his daughter Yrse only appears in Scandinavian tradition. Like Beowulf, the Annales Lundenses makes Hrothgar the contemporary of Eadgils (Athisl), whereas the Chronicon Lethrense calls the Swedish king Hakon.

The family tree of legendary Kings of the Danes, according to Chronicon Lethrense

Kings of the Danes are marked with a crown (♕).

Ypper, King of Uppsala ♂
KEY
Nori ♂	Østen ♂	♕ Dan ♂	Dannia ♀	Marriage or coupling
Parent and child
Rolfcarl, aka Rolf, a baron ♂	♕ Ro ♂	Ro's wife ♀	Succession by other means
Thora ♀
♕ Helgi ♂	♕ Haldan ♂
Athisl, King of Swethia ♂	Ursula ♀	♕ Raka, a dog ♂
Siward Albus ♂	♕ Snyo ♂
♕ Hiarwart ♂	Sculd ♀	♕ Rolf Kraki ♂
Hamund ♂
♕ Aki ♂	Haghbard ♂	daughter of Rolf Kraki ♀	♕ Fritleff ♂
♕ Frothi Largus ♂
♕ Ingyald ♂
♕ Olav ♂
♕ Asa ♀
♕ Harald Hildetan (war-tooth) ♂
♕ Hethae ♀

The source used for the genealogical information and name spellings is the English translation provided by Mischa Hooker of Augustana College.

==== Gesta Danorum ====
The Gesta Danorum (book 2), by Saxo Grammaticus, contains roughly the same information as Beowulf, the Chronicon Lethrense and the Annales Lundenses: that is, that Ro was the son of Haldanus and the brother of Helgo, and the uncle of his successor Roluo Krage (Hroðulf). It is only said about Ro that he was "short and spare", that he founded the town of Roskilde, and that when their father Haldanus died of old age, he shared the rule of the kingdom with his brother Helgo, Ro taking the land and Helgo the water.

Ro could not defend his kingdom against the Swedish king Hothbrodd, who was not happy with warring in the East but wished to test his strength against the Danes (Oliver Elton's translation):

Fain to extend his empire, he warred upon the East, and after a huge massacre of many peoples begat two sons, Athisl and Hother, and appointed as their tutor a certain Gewar, who was bound to him by great services. Not content with conquering the East, he assailed Denmark, challenged its king, Ro, in three battles, and slew him.

Ro was, however, avenged by his brother Helgo, who then promptly went east and died in shame (because he discovered that he had fathered Roluo Krake with his own daughter Urse.) Roluo succeeded his father and uncle to the Danish throne.

The Gesta Danorum also agrees with Beowulf in presenting Hrothgar (Ro) and Halga (Helgo) as brothers and the sons of Healfdene (Haldanus). Moreover, like the Chronicon Lethrense and the Annales Lundenses, it presents Hroðulf (Roluo) as the son of Halga and his own daughter. A striking difference is that the Swedish king Eadgils (Athisl) is pushed forward a generation, and instead, Saxo introduces Hrothgar's killer Hothbrodd as the father of Eadgils, a place that other sources give to Ohthere. A similar piece of information is also found in the Chronicon Lethrense and the Annales Lundenses, where Halga had to kill a man named Hodbrod to win all of Denmark. However, Saxo also adds the god Höðr as the brother of Eadgils in order to present a euhemerized version of the Baldr myth, later.

The tradition of the feud with the Heaðobards Ingeld and Froda appears twice in the Gesta Danorum. The first time it tells of the feud is Book 2, where Ingeld (called Ingild) appears with the son Agnar. In this version, Ingeld's son was about to marry Hroðulf's sister Rute, but a fight broke out and Agnar died in a duel with Bödvar Bjarki (called Biarco).

The second time it tells of Froda and Ingeld is in Book 7, but here Hrothgar is replaced by a Harald and Halga by a Haldanus. It is the Scandinavian version of the feud, similar to the one told in the Skjöldunga saga, Bjarkarímur and Hrólfr Kraki's saga, where the Heaðobards are forgotten and the feud with Froda and Ingeld has become a family feud. The main plot is that Ingeld had the sons Frodo (Froda) and Harald (corresponds to Healfdene). The relationship between Ingeld and Froda was thus reversed, a reversal also found in the Skjöldunga saga and in the Bjarkarímur. Froda killed his brother and tried to get rid of his nephews Harald (corresponds to Hrothgar) and Haldanus (corresponds to Halga). After some adventures, the two brothers burnt their uncle to death inside his house and avenged their father.

The family tree of legendary Kings of the Danes, according to the Gesta Danorum (Books 1 to 9)

Kings of the Danes are marked with a crown (♕). Kings of the Swedes are marked with a dagger (†). Superscript numbers after a name indicate in which books of Gesta Danorum the individual is mentioned.

Humblus ♂ ^{(1)}
KEY
Angul ♂ ^{(1)}	♕ Dan I ♂ ^{(1)}	Grytha ♀ ^{(1)}	Marriage or coupling
Parent and child
The Angles	♕ Humblus ♂ ^{(1)}	♕ Lotherus ♂ ^{(1)}	King of the Saxons ♂ ^{(1)}	Succession by other or unclear means
Roarus ♂ ^{(1)}
Sigtrugus, King of the Swedes† ♂ ^{(1)}	♕ Skioldus ♂ ^{(1)}	Alvilda ♀ ^{(1)}
daughter of Roarus ♀ ^{(1)}	Bessus ♂ ^{(1)}
sister of Gram ♀ ^{(1)}	Gro ♀ ^{(1)}	♕ Gram† ♂ ^{(1)}	Sumblus, King of the Finns ♂ ^{(1)}
Wagnofthus ♂ ^{(1)}
Signe ♀ ^{(1)}	Henricus, King of the Saxons ♂ ^{(1)}	Haquinus, King of the Nitherians ♂ ^{(1)}
Harthgrepa ♀ ^{(1)}
♕Suibdagerus, King of Norway† ♂ ^{(1)}	sister of Guthormus ♀ ^{(1)}	♕Guthormus ♂ ^{(1)}	♕Hadingus ♂ ^{(1,2,4,5)}	Regnilda ♀ ^{(1)}
Asmundus† ♂ ^{(1)}	Gunnilda ♀ ^{(1)}	Guthormus ♂ ^{(1)}
Ulvilda ♀ ^{(1,2)}	♕ Ubbo ♂ ^{(2)}
Henricus ♂ ^{(1)}	Uffo† ♂ ^{(1)}	Hundingus† ♂ ^{(1,2)}	Thorilda ♀ ^{(2)}	Scottus ♂ ^{(2)}
daughter of Uffo ♀ ^{(1)}	Regnerus† ♂ ^{(2)}	Suanhuita ♀ ^{(2)}	sisters of Suanhuita ♀♀ ^{(2)}	Andwan, King of the Hellespont ♂ ^{(2)}
Thoraldus ♂ ^{(2)}
♕ Frotho I ♂ ^{(2,5)}	daughter of Andwan ♀ ^{(2)}
Hothbrodus† ♂ ^{(2,3)}	♕ Haldanus I ♂ ^{(2)}	Roe ♂ ^{(2)}	Skato ♂ ^{(2)}
Thora ♀ ^{(2)}
♕ Helgo ♂ ^{(2,3)}	♕ Roe ♂ ^{(2)}
Athislus† ♂ ^{(2,3)}	Ursa ♀ ^{(2)}
King Gevarus ♂ ^{(2,3)}	♕ Rolvo Krake† ♂ ^{(2,3)}	Ruta ♀ ^{(2)}	Biarco ♂ ^{(2)}	Sculda ♀ ^{(2)}	♕Hiarwarthus † ♂ ^{(2,3)}
♕ Hotherus† ♂ ^{(2,3)}	Nanna ♀ ^{(3)}	Herlecus ♂ ^{(3)}	Gericus ♂ ^{(3)}
former King of Britain ♂ ^{(3)}	mother of the King of Britain ♀ ^{(3)}	a slave ♂ ^{(3)}	a bondmaid ♀ ^{(3)}	♕ Roricus Slyngebond ♂ ^{(3)}	Gerwendillus ♂ ^{(3)}
King of Britain ♂ ^{(3,4)}	Queen of Britain ♀ ^{(3,4)}	Gerutha ♀ ^{(3,4)}	Horwendillus ♂ ^{(3,4)}	Fengo ♂ ^{(3,4)}
foster sister of Amlethus ♀ ^{(3,4)}	daughter of the King of Britain ♀ ^{(3,4)}	Amlethus ♂ ^{(3,4)}	Herminthruda, Queen of Scotland ♀ ^{(4)}	♕ Wiglecus ♂ ^{(4)}
son of Amlethus ♂ ^{(4)}	♕Wermundus ♂ ^{(4)}	Frowinus, governor of Sleswik ♂ ^{(4)}
♕ Uffo, or Olavus the Gentle ♂ ^{(4)}	daughter of Frowin ♀ ^{(4)}	Keto ♂ ^{(4)}	Wigo ♂ ^{(4)}
♕ Dan II ♂ ^{(4)}
♕ Huglecus ♂ ^{(4)}
♕ Frotho II, the Vigorous ♂ ^{(4)}
♕ Dan III ♂ ^{(4)}
Craca ♀ ^{(5)}	Regnerus ♂ ^{(5)}	Bracus ♂ ^{(5)}	♕ Fridlevus I, the Swift ♂ ^{(4,5)}	Hun, King of the Huns ♂ ^{(5)}	Hun ♂ ^{(5)}
Gøtarus, King of Norway ♂ ^{(5)}	Westmarus ♂ ^{(5)}	Colo ♂ ^{(5)}	Gøtwara ♀ ^{(5)}
Rollerus ♂ ^{(5)}	Ericus the Shrewd-spoken† ♂ ^{(5,6)}	Gunwara the Fair ♀ ^{(5)}	Alvilda ♀ ^{(5)}	♕ Frotho III ♂ ^{(5,6)}	Hanunda ♀ ^{(5)}	Grep (eldest of three) ♂ ^{(5)}	11 other sons (two named Grep) ♂♂ ^{(5)}
Hythin, King of Tellemark ♂ ^{(6)}	Alvo ♂ ^{(5)}	Ofura ♀ ^{(5)}	Arngrimus ♂ ^{(5)}	Grubbus ♂ ^{(6)}	♕ Hiarnus ♂ ^{(6)}	Amundus, King of Norway ♂ ^{(6)}
child of Hythin ^{(6)}	Haldanus† ♂ ^{(6)}	12 sons, including Angantir ♂♂ ^{(5)}	Ano ♂ ^{(6)}	Iuritha ♀ ^{(6)}	♕ Fridlevus II ♂ ^{(6)}	Frogertha ♀ ^{(6)}
Hanevus, King of Saxony ♂ ^{(6)}	Suertingus, King of Saxony ♂ ^{(6)}	Olavus ♂ ^{(6)}	♕ Frotho IV ♂ ^{(6)}
Sywardus† ♂ ^{(6,7)}	sons of Suertingus ♂♂ ^{(6)}	sister of the sons of Suertingus ♀ ^{(6)}	♕ Ingellus ♂ ^{(6,7)}	Helga ♀ ^{(6)}	Helgo ♂ ^{(6)}	Asa ♀ ^{(6)}
three sons that died in war ♂♂ ^{(7)}	♕ Olavus I ♂ ^{(7)}	Karolus, governor of Gothland ♂ ^{(7)}
Ulvilda ♀ ^{(7)}	♕ Frotho V ♂ ^{(7)}	Hatherus ♂ ^{(7)}	♕ Haraldus I ♂ ^{(7)}	Sygne ♀ ^{(7)}
Ericus† ♂ ^{(7)}	Thorhilda ♀ ^{(7)}	♕ Haldanus II Biargrammus† ♂ ^{(7)}	♕Haraldus II ♂ ^{(7)}
Ebbo ♂ ^{(7)}	mother of Otharus ♀ ^{(7)}	♕ Unguinus, King of the Goths ♂ ^{(7)}	Asmundus ♂ ^{(7)}
sister of Otharus ♀ ^{(7)}	♕ Sywaldus I ♂ ^{(7)}	Sygrutha ♀ ^{(7)}	Kings of Norway
Sywardus, King of the Goths ♂ ^{(7)}	mother of Alvilda ♀ ^{(7)}	Otharus ♂ ^{(7)}	Syritha ♀ ^{(7)}	♕ Sygarus ♂ ^{(7)}	queen of Sygarus ♀ ^{(7)}	Hamundus, a petty king ♂ ^{(7)}
Wemundus ♂ ^{(7)}	Ostenus ♂ ^{(7)}	♕Sywaldus II ♂ ^{(7)}	Algerus ♂ ^{(7)}	Helwin ♂ ^{(7)}	Hamundus ♂ ^{(7)}
Regnaldus, King of the Northmen ♂ ^{(7)}	Alvilda ♀ ^{(7)}	Alf ♂ ^{(7)}	Sygne ♂ ^{(7)}	Hagbarthus ♂ ^{(7)}	Hako ♂ ^{(7)}
Gro ♀ ^{(7)}	Borcarus ♂ ^{(7)}	Drota ♀ ^{(7)}	Gunnarus ♂ ^{(7)}	Hano, ruler of Funen ♂ ^{(7)}	Ostmarus, ruler of Scania ♂ ^{(7)}	Hundingus, ruler of Zealand ♂ ^{(7)}	Roricus, co-ruler of Jutland ♂ ^{(7)}	Hatherus, co-ruler of Jutland ♂ ^{(7)}
Haraldus ♂ ^{(7)}	Hildigerus ♂ ^{(7)}	Røtho, a Ruthenian pirate ♂ ^{(7)}	Wesetus ♂
♕Haldanus III ♂ ^{(7)}	Guritha ♀ ^{(7)}
Alverus† ♂ ^{(7,8)}	♕ Haraldus III Hyldetan ♂ ^{(7)}
Olavus ♂ ^{(7)}	Ingo ♂ ^{(7)}	Ingeldus† ♂ ^{(7)}	sister of Haraldus ♀ ^{(7)}	Ubbo ♂ ^{(7)}	sister of Haraldus ♀ ^{(7)}	Sywardus ♂ ^{(7)}	sister of Haraldus ♀ ^{(7)}	Olavus, king of the Werms ♂ ^{(7)}
♕ Ringo I† ♂ ^{(7,8)}	♕ Hetha ♀ ^{(8)}	♕ Olo the Vigorous ♂ ^{(7,8)}	Esa ♀ ^{(7)}	son of the king ♂ ^{(7,8)}
Atylo the Scanian ♂ ^{(8)}	Ringo, ruler of Norway ♂ ^{(8)}
Tola ♂ ^{(8)}	Omothus, or Homothus ♂ ^{(8)}	daughter of Ringo ♀ ^{(8)}	Esa ♀ ^{(8)}	♕ Omundus ♂ ^{(7,8)}
Sibbo ♂ ^{(8)}	sister of Gøtarus ♀ ^{(8)}	Gøtarus† ♂ ^{(8)}	daughter of Omundus ♀ ^{(8)}	♕ Sywardus I ♂ ^{(8)}	♕ Buthlus ♂ ^{(8)}	daughter of Omundus ♀ ^{(8)}
Ebbo ♂ ^{(8)}
early wife of Iarmericus ♀ ^{(8)}	♕Iarmericus † ♂ ^{(8)}	Suanilda ♀ ^{(8)}	the Hellepontines, 4 brothers ♂♂ ^{(8)}	Iarmericus' sister, sold to Norwegians ♀ ^{(8)}	Iarmericus' sister, sold to Germans ♀ ^{(8)}
♕ Broderus ♂ ^{(8)}	nephews of Iarmericus ♂♂ ^{(8)}
King of the Goths ♂ ^{(8)}	♕ Sywaldus III ♂ ^{(8)}
King of Sweden† ♂ ^{(8)}	daughter of the King of the Goths ♀ ^{(8)}	♕ Snio ♂ ^{(8)}
♕ Biorn ♂ ^{(8)}
♕ Haraldus III ♂ ^{(8)}
a queen from Sweden ♀ ^{(8)}	♕ Gormo I ♂ ^{(8)}
♕ Gotricus, or Godefridus ♂ ^{(8,9)}
♕ Olavus III ♂ ^{(9)}	daughter of Gotricus ♀ ^{(9)}	Sywardus, King of Norway ♂ ^{(9)}	unknown
♕Hemmingus ♂ ^{(9)}	♕Siwardus II Ring ♂ ^{(9)}	♕ Ringo II ♂ ^{(9)}	Herothus† ♂ ^{(9)}	Hesbernus ♂ ^{(9)}
ruler in Norway ♂ ^{(9)}	Lathgertha ♀ ^{(9)}	♕Regnerus Lothbrog ♂ ^{(9)}	Thora ♀ ^{(9)}
Suanlogha ♀ ^{(9)}	a woman ♀ ^{(9)}
2 daughters ♀♀ ^{(9)}	Fridlevus ♂ ^{(9)}	♕ Haraldus ♂ ^{(9)}	♕ Siwardus & Ericus ♂♂ ^{(9)}	Rathbarthus ♂ ^{(9)}	Dunwatus ♂ ^{(9)}	Ubbo ♂ ^{(9)}
Regnaldus ♂ ^{(9)}	Withsercus ♂ ^{(9)}	Ericus Wind-hat ♂ ^{(9)}	Guthormus ♂ ^{(9)}	♕ Ericus I ♂ ^{(9)}	♕ Sywardus Snake-Eye ♂ ^{(9)}	Biornus ♂ ^{(9)}	Agnerus ♂ ^{(9)}	Ivarus ♂ ^{(9)}
daughter of Guthormus ♀ ^{(9)}	♕ Ericus II ♂ ^{(9)}
♕ Kanutus I ♂ ^{(9)}
♕ Frotho VI ♂ ^{(9)}
♕ Gormo II the English ♂ ^{(9)}
♕ Haraldus V ♂ ^{(9)}	Hedelradus, King of England ♂ ^{(9)}
♕ Gormo III ♂ ^{(9)}	Thira ♀ ^{(9)}
Kanutus ♂ ^{(9)}	Haraldus VI ♂ ^{(9)}

Genealogical information is derived from Oliver Elton's 1905 translation, The First Nine Books of the Danish History of Saxo Grammaticus (via Wikisource). Name spellings are from the 1931 Latin critical edition by Olrik and Ræder (via Wikisource). Regnal numbers, which do not appear in the original text, are included for clarity and taken from the engraving Veræ effigies regum omnium by Erico Olai Tormio.

== Comments ==
With the exception of Hversu Noregr byggdist, where he is only a name in a list, three elements are common to all of the accounts: he was the son of a Danish king Healfdene, the brother of Halga, and he was the uncle of Hroðulf. Apart from that, the Scandinavian tradition is unanimous in dwelling on the incestuous relationship between Halga and his daughter Yrsa which resulted in Hroðulf, a story which was either not presented in Beowulf or was not known to the poet. The Danish sources (Chronicon Lethrense, Annales Lundenses, Gesta Danorum) all agree with Beowulf by making Hrothgar the king of Denmark. The Icelandic (Skjöldunga saga, Bjarkarímur, Hrólf Kraki's saga) all agree with Beowulf by mentioning that they had a sister, and by mentioning their feud with Froda and Ingeld, albeit with alterations. What is unique to the Icelandic versions are the adventures of Hrothgar and Halga before one of the two brothers could become king.

The similarities between Beowulf and the mentioned Scandinavian sources are by far not the only ones. Other personalities mentioned in Beowulf appear in the stories before and after dealing with Hrothgar, but for more, see origins for Beowulf and Hrólf Kraki.

== Sources ==
- Kluge, Friedrich (1896). "Der Beowulf und die Hrolfs Saga Kraka." Englische Studien 22, pp. 144–45.
- Nerman, Birger (1925). "Det svenska rikets uppkomst".
- "Sidelights on Teutonic History During the Migration Period", Cambridge University Press, Cambridge, 1911; pp. 82 ff.
- Beowulf:
- Beowulf read aloud in Old English
  - Modern English translation by Francis Barton Gummere
  - Modern English translation by John Lesslie Hall
  - Ringler, Dick. Beowulf: A New Translation For Oral Delivery, May 2005. Searchable text with full audio available, from the University of Wisconsin-Madison Libraries.
  - Several different Modern English translations
- Widsith:
  - Widsith, A Verse Translation by Douglas B. Killings
  - Widsith, a translation by Bella Millett
- Chronicon Lethrense and Annales Lundense:
  - Chronicon Lethrense and Annales Lundenses in translation by Peter Tunstall
  - The same translation at Northvegr
- Book 2 of Gesta Danorum at the Online Medieval & Classical library
- Book 7 of Gesta Danorum at the Online Medieval & Classical library
- The Relation of the Hrolfs Saga Kraka and the Bjarkarimur to Beowulf by Olson, 1916, at Project Gutenberg
- Hrólf Kraki's saga in English translation at Northvegr

Legendary titles
Preceded by Heorogar	King of Denmark in Beowulf	Succeeded by Hrólf Kraki
Preceded by Haldanus I	King of Denmark in Gesta Danorum with Helgo	Succeeded by Rolvo Krake
