= Ingjald =

Semi-legendary Swedish king

Legendary King of Sweden
- Predecessor: Anund
- Successor: Ivar Vidfamne
- Died: Raening
- Spouse: Gauthild Algautsdóttir
- Issue Detail: Olof Trätälja, Åsa, Sigurd Ring
- Dynasty: House of Yngling
- Father: Anund

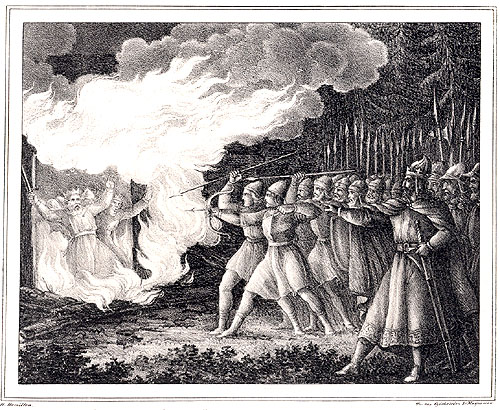
Ingjald burning six local rulers in order to centralize Sweden, as depicted by Hugo Hamilton in 1830

Ingjald illråde or Ingjaldr hinn illráði (Ingold Illruler or Illready) was a semi-legendary Swedish king of the House of Ynglings, son and successor of King Anund, and the father and predecessor of King Olof Trätälja. As with many of the 5th-7th century Yngling Kings of Sweden, his historicity is contested.

Ingjald is mentioned in medieval historiographical sources including the Ynglinga saga, Historia Norvegiæ, Hervarar saga, Upplendinga Konungum, Þorsteins saga Víkingssonar and Íslendingabók. The setting of Þorsteins saga Víkingssonar is roughly the 7th century. Johannes Magnus in his 16th-century list of kings places Ingjald (Ingevallus, Ingellus) in AD 883.

== Ynglinga saga ==
Snorri Sturluson gave an extensive account on the life of Ingjald in the Ynglinga saga which is part of the Heimskringla.

=== Youth ===
The Ynglinga saga, a part of the Heimskringla relates that the viceroy of Fjärdhundraland was named Ingvar and he had two sons, Alf and Agnar, who were of the same age as Ingjald. Svipdag the Blind was the viceroy of Tiundaland, the province of Uppsala where the Tings and the Yule (Midwinter) sacrifices were held (see the Temple at Uppsala).

One midwinter, when Ingjald and Alf were six years old, many people had assembled at Uppsala for the sacrifices. Alf and Ingjald played, but Ingjald found that he was the weaker boy and became so angry that he almost started to cry (which was strange because people named Ingjald were known to be stronger than average). His foster-brother Gautvid led him to his foster-father Svipdag the Blind and told Svipdag about Ingjald's lack of manliness and strength. Svipdag said that it was a shame and the next day he gave Ingjald a roasted wolf's heart to eat. From that day, Ingjald became a very ferocious person and had a bad disposition and breath.

Anund arranged a marriage for his son Ingjald with Gauthild, the daughter of the Geatish king Algaut, who was the son of Gautrek the Mild and the grandson of Gaut. Gautrek consented as he believed that Ingjald had inherited his father's disposition. Gauthild's maternal grandfather was Olof the Sharp-sighted, the king of Närke.

=== The deceit ===
Snorri Sturluson relates that when his father Anund had died, Ingjald became the king of Sweden. The kings at Uppsala were the foremost among the kings of the various provinces since Odin ruled the country, and they were the supreme chiefs of the other kingdoms since the death of Agne and Sweden was divided between Erik and Alrik. The descendants of these two kings had spread, cleared land and settled new territories, until there were several petty kings.

In honour of his own ascendance to the throne, Ingjald invited the kings, the jarls and other important men to a grand feast in a newly built hall, just as large and sumptuous as the one in Uppsala. It was called the hall of the seven kings and had seven high seats. Algaut the Geatish king of West Götaland, King Ingvar of Fjädrundaland with his two sons Agnar and Alf, King Sporsnjall of Nerike and King Sigvat of Attundaland came, but not King Granmar of Södermanland. The kings filled all seven seats but one. All the prominent people of Sweden had seats, except for Ingjald's own court whom he had sent to his old hall in Uppsala.

According to the custom of the time, for those who inherited kings and jarls, Ingjald rested at the footstool until the Bragebeaker was brought in. Then he was supposed to stand up, take the beaker and make solemn vows, after which he would ascend his father's high seat. However, when the beaker was brought in, he took a bull's horn and made the solemn vow that he would enlarge his own kingdom by half towards all the four-quarters, towards which he pointed his horn, or die.

When all the prominent guests were drunk, he ordered Svipdag's sons, Gautvid and Hylvid, to arm themselves and their men and to leave the building. Outside, they set fire to the building which burnt down and those who tried to escape were killed.

Thus Ingjald made himself the sole ruler of the domains of the murdered kings.

=== Wars ===
Granmar won allies in his son-in-law the sea-king Hjörvard of the Ylfings and his father-in-law Högne the Geatish king of East Götaland. They successfully withstood Ingjald's invasion where Ingjald realised that the men from the provinces he had conquered were not loyal to him. After a long standstill there was peace for as long as the three kings lived. However, one night Ingjald and his men surrounded a farm where Granmar and Hjörvard were at a feast and burnt the house down. He later disposed of five more kings, and he thus earned the name Illråde (ill-ruler) as he fulfilled his promise.

Snorri Sturluson tells that it was a common saying that Ingjald killed twelve kings by deceiving them that he only wished for peace, and that he thus earned his cognomen Illråde (ill-ruler or ill-adviser).

=== Downfall ===
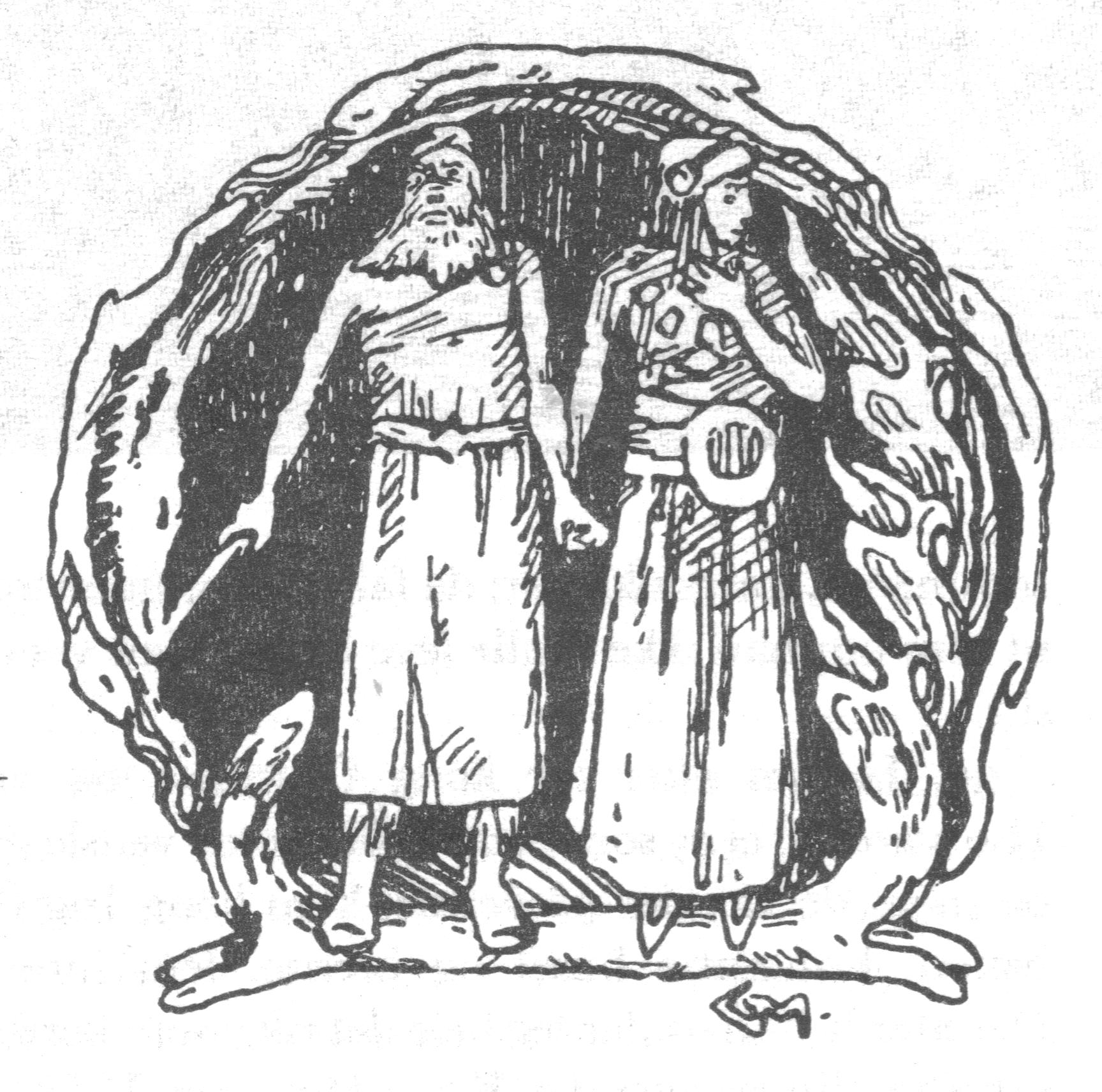
Ingjald and his daughter Åsa

Ingjald had two children, a son Olof Trätälja and a daughter Åsa. His daughter had inherited her father's psychopathic disposition. She married King Guðröðr of Skåne. Before she murdered her husband she managed to make him kill his own brother Halfdan the Valiant, the father of the great Ivar Vidfamne.

In order to avenge his father, Ivar Vidfamne gathered a vast host and departed for Sweden, where he found Ingjald at Ræning. When Ingjald and his daughter realized that it was futile to resist, they set the hall on fire and succumbed in the flames.

== Ynglingatal and Historia Norwegiae ==
The citation from Ynglingatal does not appear to describe Ingjald as an evil king. It calls his life a brave life frœknu fjörvi:

Ok Ingjald í fjörvan trað reyks rösuðr á Ræningi, þá er húsþjófr hyrjar leistum goðkonung í gegnum steig. Ok sá urðr allri þjóðu sjaldgætastr með Svíum þótti, er hann sjálfr sínu fjörvi frœknu fyrstr um fara vildi.	With fiery feet devouring flame Has hunted down a royal game At Raening, where King Ingjald gave To all his men one glowing grave. On his own hearth the fire he raised, A deed his foemen even praised; By his own hand he perished so, And life for freedom did forego."

The Historia Norwegiæ presents a Latin summary of Ynglingatal, older than Snorri's quotation (continuing after Anund):

Post istum filius suus Ingialdr in regem sublimatur, qui ultra modum timens Ivarum cognomine withfadm regem tunc temporis multis formidabilem se ipsum cum omni comitatu suo cenaculo inclusos igne cremavit. Ejus filius Olavus cognomento tretelgia [...]

After him his son Ingjald ascended the throne. Being abnormally terrified of King Ivar Vidfadme, at that time an object of dread to many, he shut himself up in a dining-hall with his whole retinue and burnt all its inmates to death. His son, Olav, known as Tretelgje,[...]

== Archaeological evidence ==
Rällinge is hill fort in Raä Helgarö 32:1, Helgarö parish, Södermanland that has small ramparts near Lake Mälaren that is thought to be a misinterpretation or incorrect spelling for the hill fort Ræning of the sagas. According to Nordic legends, Ræning was the place where Ingjald and his daughter Åsa had both met their ends at the hands of the semi-legendary Ivar Vidfamne. Throughout the last century thermoluminescence dating has found evidence of a burning that happened at the Rällinge hill fort from the supposed time of Ingjald's demise (600-650 A.D.). Moreover, the dating of the fort burning and heating does not contradict assumptions about where and when Ingjald was burned to death.

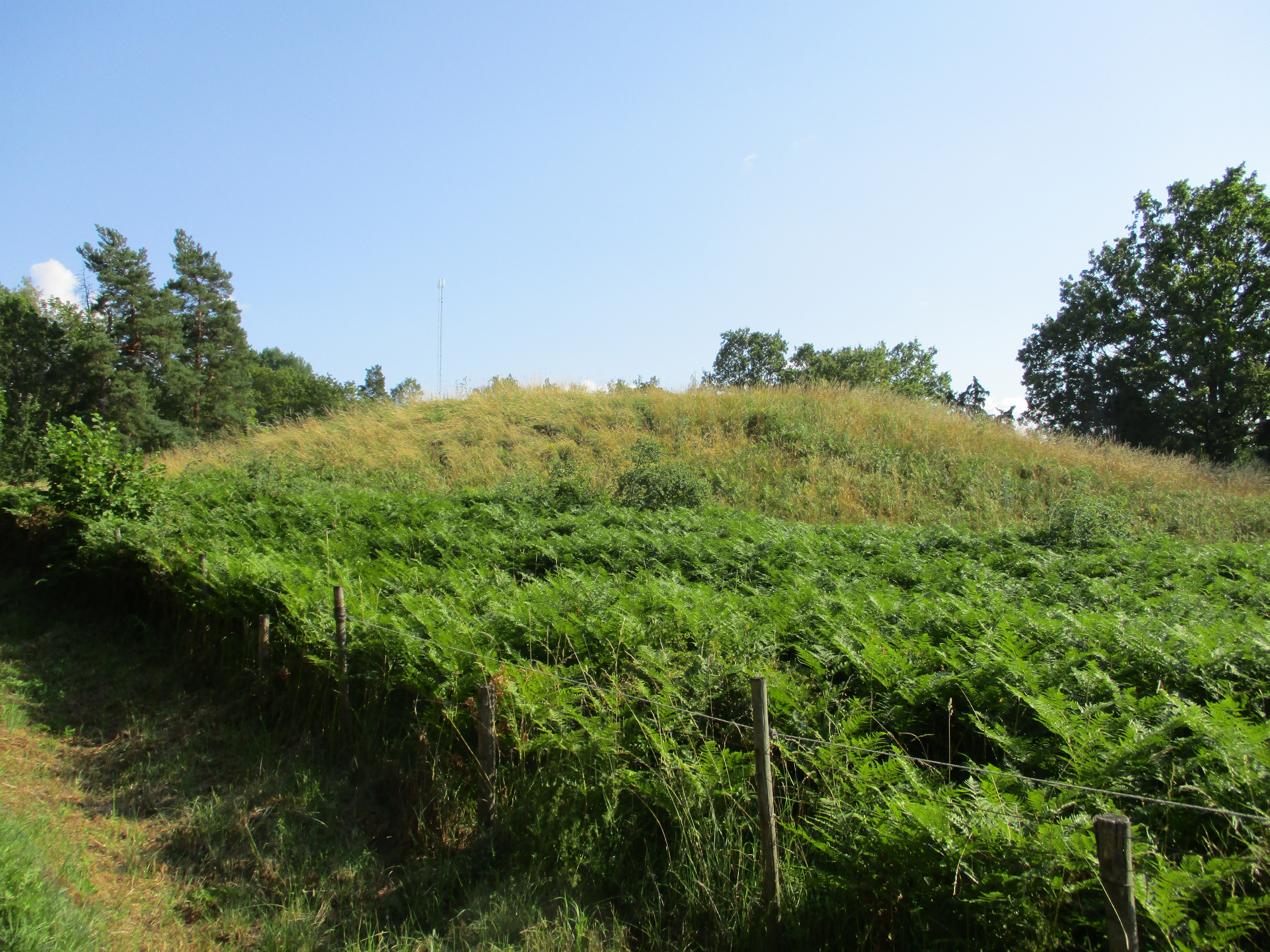
Royal barrow at Kråktorp, near Vårfruberga Abbey, named for Ingjald (as is a road leading to it) and traditionally, though not reliably, identified as his grave.

== Primary sources ==
- "The Burning at Upsal" in the Ynglinga saga at the Northvegr website.
- N. Kershaw's English translation of the Hervarar saga
- English translation at Northvegr "Of The Kings of the Uplands"
- A translation in English of Þorsteins saga Víkingssonar

== Secondary sources ==
- Nerman, B. Det svenska rikets uppkomst. Stockholm, 1925.
- A thermoluminescence date for the Rällinge hill fort, Raä 32, Helgarö parish, Södermanland : possible evidence of Ingjald's fiery demise?

Ingjald House of Yngling
Legendary titles
Preceded by Anund	Legendary king of Sweden	Succeeded by Ivar Vidfamne
Preceded by Anund	Head of the House of Yngling	Succeeded by Olof Trätälja
