= Algaut =

Algaut (or Algöt) was a Geatish king who ruled West Götaland according to the Heimskringla. Snorri Sturluson relates that he was burnt to death by his son-in-law, the Swedish king Ingjald Ill-ruler.
