= Olof Trätälja =

Son of Swedish king Ingjald illråde

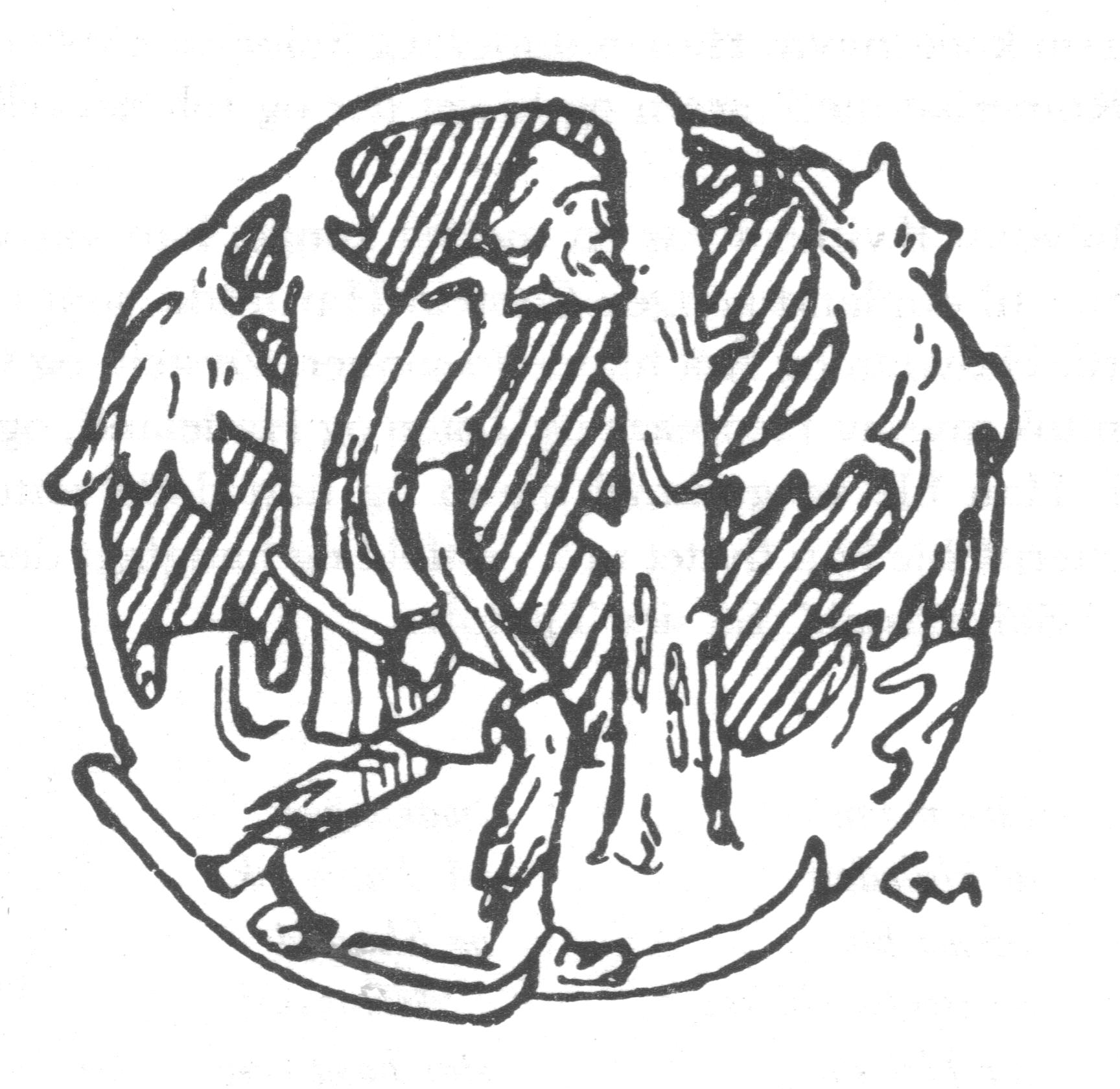
Olof Trätälja by Gerhard Munthe.

Olof Trätälja (Old Norse: Óláfr trételgja, Swedish: Olof Trätälja, Norwegian: Olav Tretelgja, all meaning Olaf Woodwhittler) was the son of the Swedish king Ingjald illråde, ruler of the House of Yngling in the 7th century according to Ynglingatal, a Skaldic poem detailing the kings of that house.

== Heimskringla ==
His mother was Gauthild, a princess of West Götaland, whose maternal grandfather was Olof the Sharp-sighted, the king of Närke.

His mother sent him to his foster-father Bove in West Gothland, where he grew up with his foster-brother Saxe who was surnamed Flette.

When Olof heard of his father's death, he assembled men who were willing to follow him and went to his kinsmen in Närke, as after his father's atrocities, the Swedes had grown hostile towards the Yngling dynasty.

When the Swedes learnt that Olof and his kin had sought refuge in Närke, they were attacked and had to head west through the deep and mountainous forests of Kilsbergen to lake Vänern and the estuary of Klarälven (where Karlstad is now situated) to get away. Here, they settled and cleared land. Soon they had supposedly created a whole province and named it Värmland, where they could make a good living.

When the Swedes learnt that Olof was clearing land, they were amused and began calling him "Trätälja" (Woodwhittler). Olof married a woman named Solveig who was a daughter of Halfdan Guldtand of Solør, Norway. Olof and Solveig had two sons, Ingjald Olofsson and Halfdan Hvitbeinn, who were brought up in Solør in the house of his mother's uncle Sölve.

Because of the harsh rule of Danish king Ivar Vidfamne, many Swedes emigrated to Värmland, and they became so numerous that the province could not sustain them. The land was afflicted by famine of which the Swedes accused Olof of causing, as per Swedish tradition, "the luck of the king is the luck of the land". They said that Olof had been neglecting his sacrifices to the gods and believed that this was the cause of the famine.

The Swedish settlers thus rebelled against Olof, surrounded his house on the shores of lake Vänern and burnt it down him inside it as a sacrifice to Odin, just as his ancestor Domalde had been sacrificed to end the poor harvests under his reign.

== Ynglingatal and Historia Norwegiae ==
However, Historia Norwegiae says that Olof succeeded his father and ruled as the king of Sweden in peace until his death.

Ejus filius Olavus cognomento tretelgia diu et pacifice functus regno plenus dierum obiit in Swethia.

His son, Olav, known as Tretelgje, accomplished a long and peaceful reign, and died in Sweden, replete in years.

The lines of Ynglingatal appear to say that he was a Swedish prince (svía jöfri), and that he was burnt inside his hall and disappeared from Gamla Uppsala.

Ok við vág, viðar (telgju) hræ Ólafs hofgyldir svalg, ok glóðfjálgr gervar leysti sonr Fornjóts af Svía jöfri. Sá áttkonr frá Uppsölum Lofða kyns fyrir löngu hvarf.

== Archaeology ==
Along the lower parts of the river Byälven in Värmland, there are three large barrows, which legend attribute to Olof Trätälja. Moreover, there are many hillforts near this river and the northern shore of Lake Vänern testifying to a violent period. Archaeological excavations from one of the hillforts, Villkorsberget, show that it was burnt in a period corresponding to Olof (510–680).

== Notes ==
Preceded by Ingjald	Head of the House of Yngling	Succeeded by Halfdan Hvitbeinn
