= Deaths in November 2011 =

The following is a list of notable deaths in November 2011.

Entries for each day are listed alphabetically by surname. A typical entry lists information in the following sequence:

- Name, age, country of citizenship at birth, subsequent country of citizenship (if applicable), reason for notability, cause of death (if known), and reference.

== November 2011 ==
=== 1 ===
- Gumaa Al-Shawan, 74, Egyptian intelligence agent.
- Cahit Aral, 84, Turkish engineer and politician, Minister of Industry and Commerce (1983–1987).
- Fanny Edelman, 100, Argentine politician, President of the PCA.
- Sam Fink, 95, American calligrapher.
- Richard Gordon, 85, British horror film producer.
- André Hodeir, 90, French author, jazz arranger and composer.
- Christiane Legrand, 81, French jazz singer.
- Sergio Montiel, 84, Argentine politician, Governor of Entre Ríos (1983–1987; 1999–2003).
- Dorothy Howell Rodham, 92, American homemaker, mother of Hillary Clinton.
- Eilaine Roth, 82, American baseball player (AAGPBL), complications from cancer.
- Héctor Rueda Hernández, 90, Colombian Roman Catholic prelate, Archbishop of Medellín (1991–1997).
- Seppo Sanaksenaho, 73, Finnish politician, Mayor of Vaasa (1997–2001).
- Katherine Siva Saubel, 91, American Cahuilla tribal leader and activist, one of the last speakers of the Cahuilla language.
- Robert A. Scalapino, 92, American political scientist.
- Ricardo Watty Urquidi, 73, American-born Mexican Roman Catholic prelate, Bishop of Tepic (since 2008), pancreatic cancer.

=== 2 ===
- Sydney Andrew, 85, English industrial chemical engineer.
- Stan Bergstein, 87, American harness racing executive.
- Sickan Carlsson, 96, Swedish actress and singer.
- Rijk de Gooyer, 85, Dutch actor, pancreatic cancer.
- Ilmar Kullam, 89, Estonian Olympic silver medal-winning (1952) basketball player.
- Lou Maletta, 74, American media executive, founder of Gay Cable Network, liver cancer.
- Eugene Maslov, 66, Russian billiards coach.
- Yoko Matsuoka McClain, 87, Japanese-born American professor (University of Oregon), granddaughter of Natsume Sōseki, stroke.
- Sid Melton, 94, American character actor (The Golden Girls, Green Acres, The Danny Thomas Show), pneumonia.
- Papa Bue, 81, Danish trombonist and bandleader.
- Antonio Molino Rojo, 85, Spanish film actor.
- Nikolay Saksonov, 88, Russian world champion weightlifter, Olympic silver medalist (1952).
- Leonard Stone, 87, American actor (Willy Wonka & the Chocolate Factory, Soylent Green, L.A. Law), cancer.
- Lucy Tejada, 91, Colombian painter.

=== 3 ===
- Matty Alou, 72, Dominican Republic-born American baseball player (Pittsburgh Pirates, San Francisco Giants, St. Louis Cardinals), diabetes.
- Rosángela Balbó, 70, Mexican-Italian born actress, lung cancer.
- Tamás Eszes, 47, Hungarian politician and paramilitary leader, suicide.
- Bob Forsch, 61, American baseball player (St. Louis Cardinals), aortic aneurysm.
- H. G. Francis, 75, German science fiction author.
- Guo Tao, 85, Chinese lieutenant general.
- Peeter Kreitzberg, 62, Estonian politician, Minister of Culture and Education (1995).
- Justo Oscar Laguna, 82, Argentinian Roman Catholic prelate, Bishop of Morón (1980–2004).
- Ivar Nørgaard, 89, Danish politician, negotiated Denmark's entry to the European Community.
- John R. Opel, 86, American computer businessman, president and CEO of IBM.
- Morris Philipson, 85, American book publisher and novelist.
- Sir Timothy Raison, 82, British politician, Member of Parliament for Aylesbury (1970–1992).
- Bruno Rubeo, 65, Italian production designer (Platoon, Driving Miss Daisy, Born on the Fourth of July), pneumonia.
- John Young, 80, Scottish politician, MSP for West of Scotland (1999–2003).

=== 4 ===
- Alfonso Cano, 63, Colombian guerrilla leader (FARC), shot.
- Emmanuel de Bethune, 82, Belgian politician, Mayor of Kortrijk (1987–1989, 1995–2000), after long illness.
- Arnold Green, 91, Estonian politician, President of the Estonian Olympic Committee (1989–1997).
- Annabelle Lyon, 95, American ballet dancer.
- Cynthia Myers, 61, American model (Playboy) and actress (Beyond the Valley of the Dolls), lung cancer.
- Norman Ramsey, Jr., 96, American physicist, Nobel Laureate (1989).
- Andy Rooney, 92, American journalist (60 Minutes), surgical complications.
- Theadora Van Runkle, 83, American costume designer (The Godfather Part II, Bonnie and Clyde, Bullitt), lung cancer.
- Sarah Watt, 53, Australian film director, bone and breast cancer.
- Tadeusz Walasek, 75, Polish Olympic silver (1960) and bronze (1964) medal-winning boxer.
- Dieudonné Yougbaré, 94, Burkinabé Roman Catholic prelate, Bishop of Koupéla (1956–1995).

=== 5 ===
- Mario Roberto Álvarez, 97, Argentine architect.
- George Ansbro, 96, American radio announcer.
- Luigi Belloli, 88, Italian Roman Catholic prelate, Bishop of the Anagni-Alatri (1987–1999).
- Franco Chillemi, 69, Italian actor and voice actor.
- Les Daniels, 68, American writer.
- Norton Dodge, 84, American economist and art collector.
- Loulou de la Falaise, 64, French fashion muse and designer (Yves Saint Laurent).
- Hannu Haapalainen, 60, Finnish ice hockey player (SM-liiga).
- Bhupen Hazarika, 85, Indian singer.
- Sir Gordon Higginson, 81, British educationalist and engineer.
- Takeo Nishioka, 75, Japanese politician, Minister of Education (1988–1989) and Speaker of the House of Councillors (since 2010), pneumonia.
- Henry D. Owen, 91, American diplomat.
- Damaskinos Papandreou, 75, Greek-born Turkish Orthodox hierarch, Metropolitan of Hadrianopolis (since 2003).
- Yuvan Shestalov, 74, Russian Mansi language writer.

=== 6 ===
- Géza Alföldy, 76, Hungarian historian.
- Gordon Beck, 75, British jazz pianist and composer.
- Isaac Chocrón, 81, Venezuelan playwright.
- Margaret Field, 89, American actress (The Man from Planet X, Captive Women, The Story of Will Rogers), cancer.
- Philip Gould, Baron Gould of Brookwood, 61, British advertising executive and political adviser, cancer.
- Giacomo Gualco, 75, Italian politician, President of Liguria (1990–1992).
- Mel Hancock, 82, American politician, U.S. Representative from Missouri (1989–1997).
- Hickstead, 15, Dutch-born Canadian show jumping horse, Olympic champion (2008), ruptured aorta.
- Hal Kanter, 92, American screenwriter, director and producer (Julia), complications from pneumonia.
- Peretz Kidron, 78, Israeli writer, journalist and translator.
- Carl Nyrén, 93, Swedish architect.
- Allan Peachey, 62, New Zealand politician, Member of Parliament for Tamaki (2005–2011), cancer.
- William David Lindsay Ride, 85, Australian zoologist.
- Charles Walton, 89, American electrical engineer, patentee of RFID.

=== 7 ===
- Lykke Aresin, 90, German physician, sexologist and writer
- James E. Barrett, 89, American federal judge.
- Joe Frazier, 67, American boxer, World Heavyweight Champion (1970–1973), liver cancer.
- Marie Ljalková, 90, Czech soldier, sniper of the Soviet Union.
- Lisbeth Movin, 94, Danish actress.
- Georgi Movsesyan, 66, Russian composer, heart attack.
- Dov Schwartzman, 90, Russian-born Israeli Haredi rabbi and rosh yeshiva.
- Tomás Segovia, 84, Spanish-born Mexican poet, cancer.
- F. Springer, 79, Dutch writer.
- Takanosato Toshihide, 59, Japanese sumo wrestler.
- Andrea True, 68, American adult film star and disco singer, heart failure.

=== 8 ===
- Jimmy Adamson, 82, British football player and coach.
- Al Boeke, 88, American architect, developer of Sea Ranch, California, and Mililani, Hawai'i.
- Hal Bruno, 83, American journalist, political director of ABC News (1980–1999), heart arrhythmia after a fall.
- Gene Cantamessa, 80, American sound engineer (E.T. the Extra-Terrestrial, Ghostbusters, Young Frankenstein), Oscar winner (1983).
- Oscar Rolando Cantuarias Pastor, 80, Peruvian Roman Catholic prelate, Archbishop of Piura (1981–2006).
- Nosson Tzvi Finkel, 68, American-born Israeli Haredi rabbi and rosh yeshiva.
- Katherine Grant, 12th Countess of Dysart, 93, Scottish peeress.
- Heavy D, 44, Jamaican-born American rapper ("Now That We Found Love") and actor (The Cider House Rules, Life), pulmonary embolism.
- Ricky Hui, 65, Hong Kong actor, heart attack.
- Sir David Jack, 87, Scottish pharmacologist.
- Bil Keane, 89, American cartoonist (The Family Circus), heart failure.
- Valentin Ivanov, 76, Russian football player and coach.
- Ed Macauley, 83, American basketball player (St. Louis Hawks, Boston Celtics).
- Jimmy Norman, 74, American rhythm and blues and jazz musician and songwriter.
- Herbert S. Okun, 80, American diplomat.
- Floyd Rice, 62, American football player (San Diego Chargers, Oakland Raiders), lung cancer.
- Vladimir Shitov, 60, Russian luger.
- Lauri Sutela, 93, Finnish military officer, Chief of Defence (1974–1983).
- Jan Wypiorczyk, 64, Polish Olympic wrestler.

=== 9 ===
- Shmuel Ben-Artzi, 96, Israeli writer, father-in-law of Benjamin Netanyahu.
- Bob Carney, 79, American basketball player (Minneapolis Lakers).
- Roger Christian, 75, American Olympic gold medal-winning (1960) ice hockey player.
- Ézio, 45, Brazilian football player, pancreatic cancer.
- Har Gobind Khorana, 89, Indian-born American biochemist, Nobel laureate (1968).
- Wilfred G. Lambert, 85, English historian and archaeologist.
- Benny McCoy, 96, American baseball player (Detroit Tigers, Philadelphia Athletics).
- Sir Robin Mountfield, 72, British civil servant.
- Dani Wadada Nabudere, 79, Ugandan academic.
- Jean-Paul Randriamanana, 52, Malagasy Roman Catholic prelate, Auxiliary Bishop of Antananarivo (since 1999).
- Terry Willers, 76, Irish cartoonist.

=== 10 ===
- Peter J. Biondi, 69, American politician, member of the New Jersey General Assembly (since 1998), mesothelioma.
- David Boyd, 87, Australian artist.
- Manuel Carbonell, 93, Cuban-born American sculptor.
- Winston C. Doby, 71, American mathematician.
- Ana Grepo, 36, Croatian model, carbon monoxide asphyxiation.
- Barbara Grier, 78, American publisher (Naiad Press) and writer, cancer.
- Andrei Igorov, 71, Romanian sprint canoer.
- Ivan Martin Jirous, 67, Czech poet and dissident.
- Alan Keen, 73, British politician, MP for Feltham and Heston (since 1992), cancer.
- Killer Karl Kox, 80, American professional wrestler.
- Petar Kralj, 70, Serbian actor.
- Jacques Lataste, 89, French Olympic fencer.
- Hiroshi Saito, 78, Japanese Olympic basketball player.
- Andy Tielman, 75, Dutch Indorock musician, gastric cancer.
- Adrián Yospe, 41, Argentine actor, cancer.

=== 11 ===
- Dennis Alexander, 76, English footballer.
- William Aramony, 84, American charity executive.
- Francisco Blake Mora, 45, Mexican politician, Secretary of the Interior (since 2010), helicopter crash.
- Domenico Tarcisio Cortese, 80, Italian Roman Catholic prelate, Bishop of Mileto-Nicotera-Tropea (1979–2007).
- John Francis Donoghue, 83, American Roman Catholic prelate, Archbishop of Atlanta (1993–2004), after short illness.
- Emory Folmar, 81, American politician, Mayor of Montgomery, Alabama (1977–1999), after long illness.
- Michael Garrick, 78, English jazz pianist and composer, cerebral hemorrhage.
- Fridtjof Frank Gundersen, 77, Norwegian jurist and politician.
- Choiseul Henriquez, 51, Haitian politician.
- Kent Kammerer, 78, American teacher and activist.
- Charlie Lea, 54, French-born American baseball player (Montreal Expos), heart attack.
- Hellmut May, 90, Austrian Olympic figure skater.
- Bernd Methe, 47, German handball referee, traffic accident.
- Reiner Methe, 47, German handball referee, traffic accident.
- David Myers, 73, American politician, Oklahoma State Senator (2002–2011), pneumonia.
- Pushpa Ratna Sagar, 89, Nepalese grammarian.
- Nick Strincevich, 96, American baseball player (Pittsburgh Pirates, Boston Braves).

=== 12 ===
- Gavin Bornholdt, 63, New Zealand Olympic sailor (1976).
- Doyle Bramhall, 62, American blues musician, heart failure.
- Alun Evans, 69, Welsh football administrator, General Secretary of the Football Association of Wales (1982–1995), after long illness.
- George Hazle, 87, South African Olympic athlete.
- Zbigniew Jaworowski, 84, Polish physicist.
- Evelyn Lauder, 75, Austrian-born American philanthropist (The Breast Cancer Research Foundation), creator of pink ribbon symbol, complications from ovarian cancer.
- Julius C. Michaelson, 89, American politician, Rhode Island Attorney General (1975–1979) and State Senator (1962–1974).
- Eva Monley, 88, German-born Kenyan film location scout (Empire of the Sun, Lawrence of Arabia).
- Peter Roebuck, 55, British-Australian cricketer and columnist, suicide by self-defenestration.
- Jim Sullivan, 43, Canadian curler, world junior champion (1988), suicide.
- Ilya Zhitomirskiy, 22, Russian-born American Internet entrepreneur, co-founder of Diaspora social network site, apparent suicide by inert helium asphyxiation.

=== 13 ===
- Nigel Abbott, 91, Australian politician, member of the Tasmanian House of Assembly for Denison (1964–1972).
- Anders John Aune, 87, Norwegian politician.
- Bobsam Elejiko, 30, Nigerian footballer, traumatic aortic rupture.
- Guido Falaschi, 22, Argentine racing driver, racing accident.
- Patrick Ford, 55, former Commonwealth featherweight boxing champion, heart attack.
- Bayazit Gizatullin, 75, Russian Olympic skier.
- Masao Nakayama, 70, Micronesian politician and diplomat, complications from a stroke.
- Pat Passlof, 83, American painter, cancer.
- Esperanza Pérez Labrador, 89, Cuban-born Argentine human rights activist (Mothers of the Plaza de Mayo).
- Jamie Pierre, 38, American professional skier, avalanche.
- Artemio Lomboy Rillera, 64, Philippine Roman Catholic prelate, Bishop of Bangued (1993–2005) and San Fernando de La Union (since 2005).
- Solly Tyibilika, 32, South African rugby player, shot.

=== 14 ===
- Esin Afşar, 75, Turkish singer and stage actress, leukemia.
- Alan F. Alford, 49-50, British writer and speaker.
- Franz Josef Degenhardt, 79, German poet, satirist, novelist and folk singer.
- Guy Dejouany, 90, French businessman.
- Richard Douthwaite, 69, British economist and ecologist.
- Alf Fields, 92, English footballer (Arsenal F.C.).
- Maurice Gaidon, 83, French Roman Catholic prelate, Bishop of Cahors (1987–2004).
- Neil Heywood, 41, British businessman, poisoned.
- Brikt Jensen, 83, Norwegian literary critic and publisher.
- Jackie Leven, 61, Scottish musician, lung cancer.
- John Lincoln, 95, Australian judge.
- Cargill MacMillan Jr., 84, American billionaire businessman.
- Peter Naigow, app. 65, Liberian politician, Vice President of Liberia (1991).
- Teresa P. Pica, 66, American academic and educator.
- Lee Pockriss, 87, American songwriter ("Itsy Bitsy Teenie Weenie Yellow Polka Dot Bikini").
- Jo Ann Sayers, 93, American actress.
- Čestmír Vejdělek, 86, Czech writer.

=== 15 ===
- William Arveson, 76, American mathematician.
- Lev Borisov, 77, Russian actor, stroke.
- Oba Chandler, 65, American convicted murderer, executed by lethal injection.
- Antonio Eceiza, 76, Spanish film director and screenwriter.
- Dulcie Gray, 95, English actress (Howards' Way) and novelist, widow of Michael Denison, bronchial pneumonia.
- John Hart, 75, English schoolmaster, first man to win Mastermind.
- Thomas Worrall Kent, 89, Canadian journalist and public servant, cardiac arrest.
- Moogy Klingman, 61, American rock keyboardist (Utopia) and songwriter, cancer.
- Ingrid Sandahl, 87, Swedish Olympic gold medal-winning (1952) gymnast.
- Karl Slover, 93, Slovak-born American actor (The Wizard of Oz).

=== 16 ===
- Ruslan Akhtakhanov, 58, Chechen poet and academic, shot.
- Hale Baugh, 87, American Olympic modern pentathlete.
- Jacobus Duivenvoorde, 83, Dutch-born Indonesian Roman Catholic prelate, Archbishop of Merauke (1972–2004).
- Djamel Keddou, 59, Algerian football player and manager (USM Alger).
- Armando Morales, 84, Nicaraguan painter.
- René A. Morel, 79, French-born American violin luthier.
- James Fraser Mustard, 84, Canadian doctor and early childhood educator, cancer.
- Eddy Palchak, 71, Canadian ice hockey trainer and equipment manager.
- Andrzej Skarbek, 86, Polish psychologist.
- Maureen Swanson, 78, British actress.

=== 17 ===
- John Booth, 61, Australian politician, member of the New South Wales Legislative Assembly (1984–1991).
- Olin Branstetter, 82, American politician, Oklahoma State Senator (1987–1991), plane crash.
- Kurt Budke, 50, American women's basketball coach (Oklahoma State University), plane crash.
- José de Aquino Pereira, 91, Brazilian Roman Catholic prelate, Bishop of São José do Rio Preto (1968–1997).
- Gary Garcia, 63, American musician (Buckner & Garcia).
- Enric Garriga i Trullols, 85, Spanish Catalan independentist and defender of Occitan Nation.
- Richard Kuh, 90, American lawyer.
- Ng Chiau-tong, 79, Taiwanese activist, chairman of the World United Formosans for Independence (1995–2011), surgical complications.
- Alexis Phạm Văn Lộc, 92, Vietnamese Roman Catholic prelate, Bishop of Kontum (1975–1995).
- Peter Reading, 65, English poet.
- Charles M. Williams, 94, American professor of finance.

=== 18 ===
- Mark Blaug, 84, British economist.
- Erik Gjems-Onstad, 89, Norwegian politician and resistance member.
- Walt Hazzard, 69, American basketball player (Los Angeles Lakers, Atlanta Hawks), complications following heart surgery.
- David Langdon, 97, British cartoonist.
- Jones Mwewa, 38, Zambian footballer.
- Ülo Nugis, 67, Estonian politician and economist.
- Paul Ezra Rhoades, 54, American spree killer, execution by lethal injection.
- Daniel Sada, 58, Mexican author and poet, kidney disease.

=== 19 ===
- Ömer Lütfi Akad, 95, Turkish film director.
- David Bolstad, 42, New Zealand champion woodchopper.
- Francis Cabot, 86, American gardener and horticulturist.
- Gordon S. Clinton, 91, American politician, Mayor of Seattle (1956–1964).
- Yvan Covent, 71, Belgian Olympic cyclist.
- Basil D'Oliveira, 80, South African-born English cricketer.
- Sonny Dixon, 87, American baseball player (Washington Senators, Philadelphia Athletics).
- Russell Garcia, 95, American-born New Zealand composer.
- Sanford Garelik, 93, American politician, President of the New York City Council (1970–1973).
- Ladi Geisler, 83, Czech musician.
- Michael Hastings, 73, English playwright.
- Brian Haynes, 60, British Olympic sprint canoer.
- Ira Michael Heyman, 81, American lawyer and administrator, Secretary of the Smithsonian Institution (1994–2000).
- Jack Keeney, 89, American federal prosecutor.
- Marti Kheel, 63, American ecofeminist.
- Pete Leichnitz, 85, Canadian ice hockey player.
- Bjarne Lingås, 78, Norwegian Olympic boxer.
- John Neville, 86, British-born Canadian actor (The Adventures of Baron Munchausen, The X-Files, Little Women), Alzheimer's disease.
- Ronald E. Poelman, 83, American religious leader, head of The Church of Jesus Christ of Latter-day Saints, age-related causes.
- Vitaly Shlykov, 77, Russian spymaster, deputy minister of defence.
- Peter Steinwender, 83, Austrian Olympian
- Ruth Stone, 96, American poet.
- Roy West, 70, Australian football player, lung cancer.

=== 20 ===
- Noel Baker, 77, Australian football player.
- Linda Bebko-Jones, 65, American politician, member of the Pennsylvania House of Representatives (1993–2006).
- Fabio Betancur Tirado, 73, Colombian Roman Catholic prelate, Archbishop of Manizales (1996–2010).
- Lasse Brandeby, 66, Swedish journalist, actor and television personality.
- Frank Leonard Brooks, 100, Canadian artist.
- David Cargill, 75, Scottish footballer.
- Shelagh Delaney, 72, English playwright (A Taste of Honey) and screenwriter (Dance with a Stranger), breast cancer and heart failure.
- Theodore J. Forstmann, 71, American financier (IMG, Topps, Gulfstream) and philanthropist, brain cancer.
- Alex Ibru, 66, Nigerian newspaper publisher and politician, Minister of Internal Affairs (1993–1995).
- Lenny Lyles, 75, American football player (Baltimore Colts).
- Malcolm Mackintosh, 89, British intelligence analyst.
- Mario Martiradonna, 73, Italian footballer.
- David Messas, 77, French rabbi.
- Viktor Modzolevsky, 68, Russian Olympic silver (1968) and bronze-medal winning (1972) fencer, road accident.
- Larry Munson, 89, American play-by-play radio announcer (Georgia Bulldogs), pneumonia.
- Javier Pradera, 77, Spanish anti-Franco activist, publisher, political analyst and journalist, founder of El País.
- Karl Aage Præst, 89, Danish football player.
- Talaat Sadat, 57, Egyptian politician.
- Itzhak Schneor, 85, Israeli football player and manager.
- Barry Steers, 84, Canadian diplomat, Ambassador to Brazil (1971–1976), Japan (1981–1989), High Commissioner to Bermuda (1976–1979).

=== 21 ===
- Benjamin Abramowitz, 94, American painter, printmaker, and sculptor.
- Dave Adams, 91, Canadian football player.
- Syd Cain, 93, British production designer (From Russia with Love, Lolita, Frenzy).
- Albert D. Cohen, 97, Canadian businessman.
- Herb Capozzi, 86, Canadian businessman, sport team owner and provincial politician, tongue cancer.
- Arie van Deursen, 80, Dutch historian.
- Theodore Enslin, 86, American poet.
- George Gallup Jr., 81, American pollster, liver cancer.
- Greg Halman, 24, Dutch baseball player (Seattle Mariners), stabbed.
- Eli Hurvitz, 79, Israeli industrialist.
- John Jukes, 88, English Roman Catholic prelate, Auxiliary Bishop of Southwark (1979–1998).
- Jim Lewis, 84, English Olympic footballer.
- Anne McCaffrey, 85, American fantasy writer (Dragonriders of Pern series), stroke.
- Hal Miller, 81, American football player.
- Hal Patterson, 79, American player of Canadian football (Montreal Alouettes, Hamilton Tiger-Cats).

=== 22 ===
- Svetlana Alliluyeva, 85, Soviet-born American defector and author, daughter of Joseph Stalin, colon cancer.
- Stan Case, 59, American radio anchor (CNN Radio), road accident.
- Pío Corcuera, 90, Argentinian football player.
- Princess Elisabeth, Duchess of Hohenberg, 88, Luxembourgish princess.
- Ray Flockton, 81, Australian cricketer.
- Miguel González Avelar, 74, Mexican politician, Secretary of Public Education (1985–1988), heart and renal failure.
- Robert E. Holthus, 77, American racehorse trainer, heart attack.
- Carlos Jonguitud Barrios, 87, Mexican union leader and politician, Governor of San Luis Potosí (1979–1985).
- Sena Jurinac, 90, Bosnian-born Austrian opera singer.
- Georg Kreisler, 89, Austrian-born American cabarettist, satirist, composer and author.
- Bud Lewis, 103, American golfer, oldest living member of the Professional Golfers' Association of America, natural causes.
- Lynn Margulis, 73, American biologist and evolution theorist, stroke.
- Danielle Mitterrand, 87, French activist, widow of François Mitterrand, First Lady of the French Republic (1981–1995).
- Dorothy Morris, 89, American actress.
- Paul Motian, 80, American jazz drummer, myelodysplastic syndrome.
- Frank Pyke, 69, Australian footballer, sports scientist, academic and sports administrator.
- Hans Reichel, 62, German guitarist, inventor of the daxophone.
- Alberto Reynoso, 71, Filipino Olympic basketball player (1968).
- Kristian Schultze, 66, German musician.
- Bison Smith, 41, American professional wrestler, heart complications.
- Horacio Villafañe, 48, Argentine musician and songwriter (Todos Tus Muertos), gastrointestinal bleeding.
- Himie Voxman, 99, American musician.

=== 23 ===
- Sir Peter Buchanan, 86, British vice admiral and naval secretary.
- Charles de Wolff, 79, Dutch organist and composer.
- Montserrat Figueras, 69, Spanish soprano.
- Oscar Griffin Jr., 78, American journalist, winner of the 1963 Pulitzer Prize.
- Ralph E. Haines Jr., 98, American general, Vice Chief of Staff of the United States Army (1967–1968).
- Huang Weilu, 94, Chinese engineer, chief designer of JL-1.
- Luis Fernando Jaramillo Correa, 76, Colombian politician, Minister of Foreign Affairs (1990–1991).
- Gerald Laing, 75, British pop artist and sculptor.
- Marion Montgomery, 86, American poet.
- Carlos Moorhead, 89, American politician, U.S. Representative from California (1973–1997), Alzheimer's disease.
- Henry Øberg, 80, Norwegian football referee.
- Jim Rathmann, 83, American racing driver, winner of the 1960 Indianapolis 500.
- Joseph Sewall, 89, American politician, President of the Maine Senate (1975–1982).
- Obrad Stanojević, 77, Serbian law professor.
- Rafiq Tağı, 61, Azerbaijani journalist, stabbed.

=== 24 ===
- Antonio Domingo Bussi, 85, Argentine general and politician, Governor of Tucumán Province, heart failure.
- Bill Carow, 87, American Olympic speed skater.
- Helen Forrester, 92, British-born Canadian writer.
- Ludwig Hirsch, 65, Austrian singer and actor, suicide by self-defenestration.
- Rauf Khalid, 53, Pakistani actor, writer, director and producer, road accident.
- Kishenji, 53, Indian Maoist guerrilla leader, shot.
- Imants Kokars, 90, Latvian conductor.
- Ross MacManus, 84, English musician.
- Humberto Medina, 69, Mexican Olympic footballer (1968).
- Salvatore Montagna, 40, Canadian mobster, shot.
- Jeno Paulucci, 93, American businessman (Michelina's), pioneer of ready-made ethnic foods.
- Anuruddha Ratwatte, 73, Sri Lankan politician and cabinet minister.
- David Seely, 4th Baron Mottistone, 91, British aristocrat, Lord Lieutenant of the Isle of Wight (1986–1995).
- Tatyana Shchelkanova, 74, Russian Olympic bronze medal-winning (1964) track and field athlete.
- Johnny Williams, 76, English footballer (Plymouth Argyle).

=== 25 ===
- Vasily Alekseyev, 69, Russian Olympic gold-medal winning weightlifter (1972 and 1976), heart failure.
- Milla Baldo-Ceolin, 87, Italian physicist.
- Lisa Fay Beatty, 47, American punk rock musician (7 Year Bitch), traffic collision.
- John Blades, 51, Australian experimental music artist.
- Leonid Borodin, 73, Russian novelist, journalist and Soviet dissident.
- Hugh Burnett, 87, English television producer and cartoonist.
- Don DeVito, 72, American record company executive and producer.
- Mihailo Đurić, 86, Serbian philosopher.
- John Edzerza, 63, Canadian politician, Yukon MLA for McIntyre-Takhini (since 2002), leukemia.
- Fred Etcher, 79, Canadian Olympic silver medal-winning (1960) ice hockey player.
- Karel Hubáček, 87, Czech architect, designer of the Ještěd Tower.
- Erling Lægreid, 72, Norwegian author and journalist.
- Judy Lewis, 76, American actress (General Hospital, The Secret Storm), daughter of Clark Gable and Loretta Young, cancer.
- Hoddy Mahon, 79, American college basketball coach (Seton Hall University).
- Frederik Meijer, 91, American businessman, Chairman of Meijer (1964–1990), stroke.
- Yukio Nishimoto, 91, Japanese baseball player and manager, heart failure.
- Coco Robicheaux, 64, American blues musician and artist.
- Dane Searls, 23, Australian BMX rider, diving accident.
- Jean Casselman Wadds, 91, Canadian politician, MP for Grenville—Dundas (1958–1968); High Commissioner to the United Kingdom (1979–1983).
- Tom Wicker, 85, American journalist, heart attack.
- Lee "Shot" Williams, 73, American blues singer.

=== 26 ===
- Judit Bognár, 72, Hungarian Olympic athlete.
- Manon Cleary, 69, American realist painter, chronic obstructive pulmonary disease.
- István Gajda, 30, Hungarian football player, road accident.
- Ed Harrington, 70, American-born Canadian football player (Toronto Argonauts), cancer.
- Keef Hartley, 67, British musician, complications from surgery.
- Rashid Karim, 86, Bangladeshi novelist.
- Roland Lacombe, 73, French Olympic cyclist (1960).
- Ron Lyle, 70, American boxer, U.S. Amateur Heavyweight Champion (1970), complications from stomach ailment.
- Ludwig Meister, 91, German Luftwaffe flying ace.
- Iván Menczel, 69, Hungarian Olympic gold-medal winning (1968) footballer.
- Patrick Mollison, 97, British haematologist.
- C. Odumegwu Ojukwu, 78, Nigerian politician, Biafra rebel leader and President of Biafra (1967–1970), stroke.
- Tsewang Yishey Pemba, 80, Tibetan physician.
- Mak Schoorl, 98, Dutch Olympic rower (1936).
- Martin Schroyens, 81, Belgian footballer
- Arthur Schultz, 78, American politician, Mayor of Joliet, Illinois (1991–2011), heart failure.

=== 27 ===
- Donald Crowdis, 97, Canadian museum curator and broadcaster.
- Len Fulford, 83, British photographer and television commercial director (Go to work on an egg, Guinness).
- Sultan Khan, 71, Indian musician, recipient of the 2010 Padma Bhushan, kidney failure.
- Nolan Luhn, 90, American football player.
- April Phumo, 74, South African football coach, cancer.
- Vladimir Prikhodko, 67, French Olympic athlete.
- Ken Russell, 84, British film director (Women in Love, Tommy), stroke.
- Gary Speed, 42, Welsh football player and manager, suicide by hanging.
- Judd Woldin, 86, American Tony Award-winning composer (Raisin), cancer.

=== 28 ===
- Aruwa Ameh, 20, Nigerian footballer (Bayelsa United).
- Vittorio De Seta, 88, Italian film director and screenwriter.
- Jon Driver, 49, British psychologist and neuroscientist.
- Jaime González, 78, Spanish Olympic sports shooter (1968, 1972, 1976, 1980).
- Charles Hoeflich, 97, American businessman.
- Thomas J. Kirwan, 78, American politician, member of the New York State Assembly (1995–2008; 2011), kidney failure.
- Paweł Komorowski, 81, Polish film director.
- Charles T. Kowal, 71, American astronomer.
- Lucio Magri, 79, Italian journalist and politician, assisted suicide.
- Ante Marković, 87, Croatian politician, Prime Minister of the Socialist Federal Republic of Yugoslavia (1989–1991).
- Lloyd J. Old, 78, American immunologist and cancer researcher, prostate cancer.
- Zhu Zhaoxiang, 90, Chinese engineer.

=== 29 ===
- James Atherton, 83, American photographer, cardiovascular disease.
- Roberto Casuso, 57, Cuban Olympic handball player.
- Annetto Depasquale, 73, Maltese Roman Catholic prelate, Titular Bishop of Aradi, Auxiliary Bishop of Malta (since 1998).
- Donatus Djagom, 92, Indonesian Roman Catholic prelate, Archbishop of Ende (1968–1996).
- Guillermo O'Donnell, 75, Argentine political scientist, cancer.
- Patrice O'Neal, 41, American comedian, radio personality, and actor (Web Junk 20, Opie and Anthony), complications from stroke.
- Mamoni Raisom Goswami, 69, Indian writer and academic, multiple organ failure.

=== 30 ===
- Jules Ancion, 87, Dutch Olympic silver medal-winning (1952) field hockey player.
- Viktor Apostolov, 49, Bulgarian Olympic hammer thrower (1988).
- J. Blackfoot, 65, American soul singer, cancer.
- Nelly Byl, 92, Belgian songwriter.
- Ana Daniel, 83, Portuguese poet.
- Vic Finkelstein, 73, South African disabled rights activist.
- Gerd Hagman, 92, Swedish actress.
- Charles Ingabire, Rwandan journalist, shot.
- Leka, Crown Prince of Albania, 72, Albanian royal and politician, pretender to the Albanian throne (since 1961).
- Peter Lunn, 97, British Olympic alpine skier (1936) and spymaster.
- Kuldeep Manak, 62, Indian Punjabi language singer, pneumonia.
- George McCarty, 96, American college basketball coach (New Mexico State University, UTEP).
- Chester McGlockton, 42, American football player (Oakland Raiders, Kansas City Chiefs, Denver Broncos), apparent heart attack.
- Zdeněk Miler, 90, Czech animator and illustrator, creator of The Mole.
- Robert Osserman, 84, American mathematician.
- Carl Robie, 66, American Olympic gold (1968) and silver-medal winning (1964) swimmer.
- Partap Sharma, 71, Indian playwright.
- Benyamin Sönmez, 28, German-born Turkish cellist.
- Bill Waller, 85, American politician, Governor of Mississippi (1972–1976), heart failure.
