= Pierre Trần Thanh Chung =

Vietnamese Roman Catholic prelate (1927–2023)

His Excellency Pierre Trần Thanh Chung
- Bishop of Kon Tum
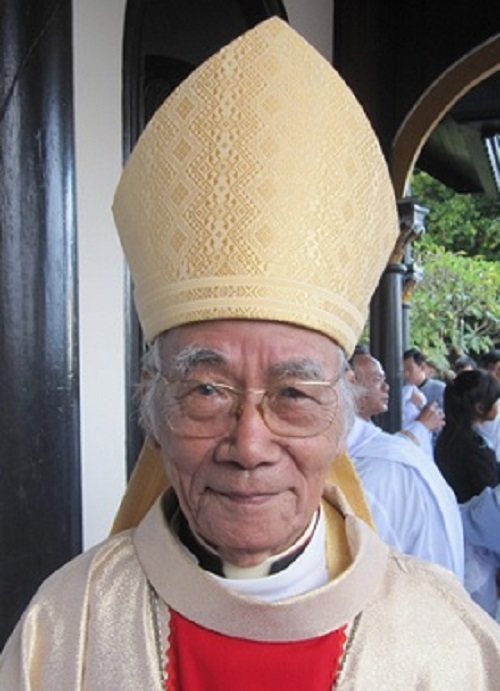
- Native name: Phêrô Trần Thanh Chung
- Province: Huế
- See: Kon Tum
- Appointed: 26 March 1981 (as Coadjutor)
- Installed: 8 April 1995
- Term ended: 16 July 2003
- Predecessor: Alexis Phạm Văn Lộc
- Successor: Michel Hoăng Ðức Oanh
- Previous post: Coadjutor Bishop of Kon Tum (1981–1995)

Orders
- Ordination: 25 May 1955 by Paul Léon Seitz MEP
- Consecration: 22 November 1981 by Alexis Phạm Văn Lộc

Personal details
- Born: 10 November 1927 Da Nang, Annam, French Indochina
- Died: 10 September 2023 (aged 95) Chư Prông district, Vietnam
- Motto: Dilexit me (He loves me) (Ngài yêu tôi)

Pierre Trần Thanh Chung (10 November 1927 – 10 September 2023) was a Vietnamese Roman Catholic prelate. He was bishop of Kon Tum from 1995 to 2003.

Catholic Church titles
Preceded by Alexis Phạm Văn Lộc	Bishop of Kon Tum; 1995–2003	Succeeded by Michel Hoăng Ðức Oanh
Preceded by —	Coadjutor Bishop of Kon Tum; 1981–1995	Succeeded by —
