= Chillemi =

Chillemi is an Italian surname. Notable people with the surname include:

- Francesca Chillemi (born 1985), Italian actress, model, television personality, and beauty pageant winner
- Franco Chillemi (1942–2011), Italian actor and voice actor
