= Gamla Uppsala =

Village outside Uppsala in Sweden

Coordinates: 59.897°N 17.629°E

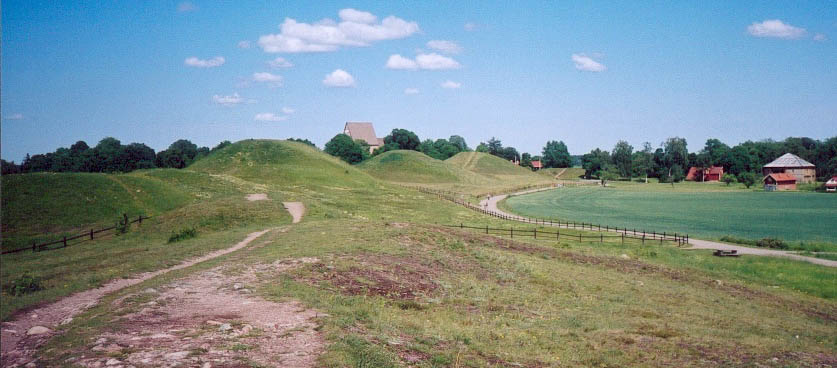
Gamla Uppsala is an area rich in archaeological remains: seen from the grave field whose larger mounds (left part) are close to the Royal Mounds. The building beyond the mounds is the church and to its right is the low Ting-mound and then Gamla Uppsala museum.

Gamla Uppsala (Swedish: [ˈɡâmːla ˈɵ̂pːˌsɑːla], Old Uppsala) is a parish and a village outside Uppsala in Sweden. It had 17,973 inhabitants in 2016.

As early as the 3rd century AD and the 4th century AD and onwards, it was an important religious, economic and political centre. Early written sources show that already during prehistory, Gamla Uppsala was widely famous in Northern Europe as the residence of Swedish kings of the legendary Yngling dynasty. In fact, the oldest Scandinavian sources, such as Ynglingatal, the Westrogothic law and the Gutasaga talk of the King of the Swedes (Suiones) as the "King at Uppsala". It was the main centre of the Swedes.

During the Middle Ages, it was the largest village of Uppland, the eastern part of which probably originally formed the core of the complex of properties belonging to the Swedish Crown, the so-called Uppsala öd, of which the western part consisted of the royal estate itself, kungsgården.

It was also the location of the Thing of all Swedes which was a thing (general assembly) held from prehistoric times to the Middle Ages, at the end of February or early March. It was held in conjunction with a great fair called Disting, and a Norse religious celebration called Dísablót. The Law of Uppland says that it was at this assembly that the king proclaimed that the fleet levy would be summoned for warfare during the summer, and all the crews, rowers, commanders and ships were decided.

It was not only the Norse cultic centre, it also became Sweden's archbishopric in 1164.

== Geographical description ==
Gamla Uppsala lies on Fyris Wolds, a cultivated plain in the valley of the River Fyris which is densely populated in its southern part, while the northern part consists of farms.

== Religious importance ==
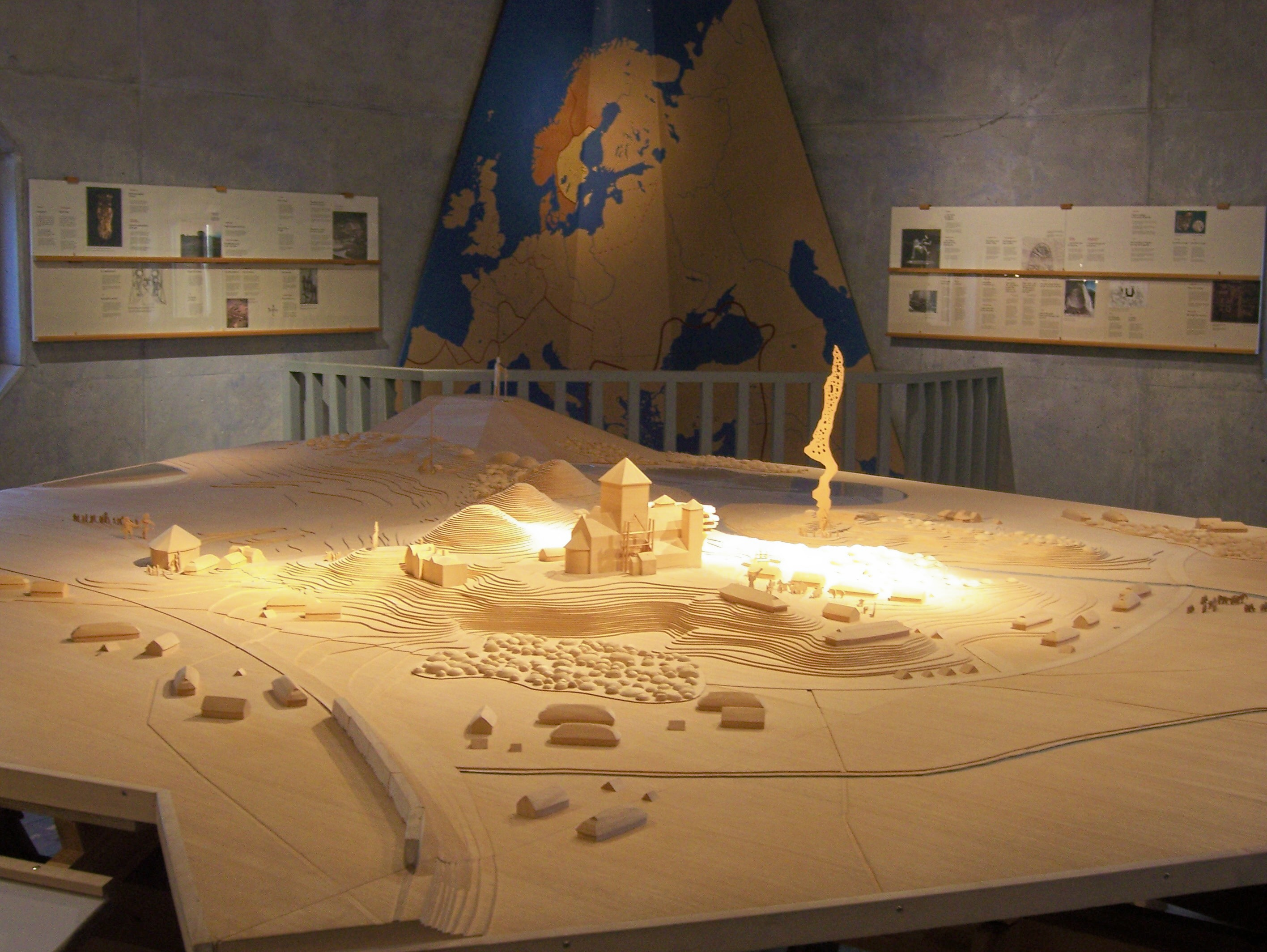
A composite model of Gamla Uppsala from throughout history, as exhibited at the local museum.

Medieval Scandinavians held Gamla Uppsala as one of the oldest and most important locations in Scandinavia. The Danish chronicler Saxo Grammaticus held Odin himself to have resided in Gamla Uppsala far back in the mists of time:

At this time there was one Odin, who was credited over all Europe with the honour, which was false, of godhead, but used more continually to sojourn at Uppsala; and in this spot, either from the sloth of the inhabitants or from its own pleasantness, he vouchsafed to dwell with somewhat especial constancy.

This tradition was also known by the Icelandic historian Snorri Sturluson, who, however had Odin reside in nearby Fornsigtuna, whereas the god Freyr lived in Gamla Uppsala. Freyr is also said to have founded two of the central institutions of Iron Age Sweden, the Uppsala öd and the Temple at Uppsala:

Frey took the kingdom after Njord, and was called drot by the Swedes, and they paid taxes to him. He was, like his father, fortunate in friends and in good seasons. Frey built a great temple at Uppsala, made it his chief seat, and gave it all his taxes, his land, and goods. Then began the Upsal domains, which have remained ever since.

Saxo Grammaticus adds that Freyr began the human sacrifices at Gamla Uppsala:

Also Frey, the regent of the gods, took his abode not far from Uppsala, where he exchanged for a ghastly and infamous sin-offering the old custom of prayer by sacrifice, which had been used by so many ages and generations. For he paid to the gods abominable offerings, by beginning to slaughter human victims.

The sacrifices at the Temple at Uppsala are described by Adam of Bremen:

At this point I shall say a few words about the religious beliefs of the Swedes. That nation has a magnificent temple, which is called Uppsala, located not far from the city of Sigtuna. In this temple, built entirely of gold, the people worship the statues of three gods.

A general festival for all the provinces of Sweden is customarily held at Uppsala every nine years. Participation in this festival is required of everyone. Kings and their subjects, collectively and individually, send their gifts to Uppsala; and – a thing more cruel than any punishment – those who have already adopted Christianity buy themselves off from these ceremonies. The sacrifice is as follows: Of every kind of male creature, nine victims are offered. By the blood of these creatures it is the custom to appease the gods.

Their bodies, moreover, are hanged in a grove which is adjacent to the temple. This grove is so sacred to the people that the separate trees in it are believed to be holy because of the death or putrefaction of the sacrificial victims. There even dogs and horses hang beside human beings. (A certain Christian told me that he had seen seventy-two of their bodies hanging up together.) The incantations, however, which are usually sung in the performance of a libation of this kind are numerous and disgraceful, and it is better not to speak of them.

In Adam's scolia, there is an additional description:

Near that temple is a very large tree with widespread branches which are always green both in winter and summer. What kind of tree it is nobody knows. There is also a spring there where the pagan are accustomed to perform sacrifices and to immerse a human being alive. As long as his body is not found, the request of the people will be fulfilled. A golden chain encircles that temple and hangs over the gables of the building. Those who approach see its gleam from afar off because the shrine, which is located on a plain, is encircled by mountains so situated as to give the effect of a theatre. For nine days feasts and sacrifices of this kind are celebrated. Every day they sacrifice one human being in addition to other animals, so that in nine days there are 72 victims which are sacrificed. This sacrifice takes place about the time of the vernal equinox.

The 16th century Johannes Magnus, the Archbishop of Uppsala, asserted that the city was anciently founded by, and named for, an early Swedish king named Ubbo (Uppsala = Ubbo's Hall), who would have supposedly reigned c. 2300 BCE. However, in the absence of any corroborating evidence, Magnus' accounts no longer enjoy widespread acceptance among scholars today.

It was a symbolic moment when Pope John Paul II visited Scandinavia in 1989 and held an open-air mass at the Royal Mounds in Gamla Uppsala, as this was a Norse religion cultic centre, which became Sweden's first archbishopric in 1164.

In 2000, the Swedish AsatruSociety restarted the tradition of holding blóts at Gamla Uppsala.

== History ==
It is a testimony to the sanctity of the location in the mindset of followers of medieval Norse religion that Gamla Uppsala was the last stronghold of pre-Christian, Norse Germanic kingship. During the 1070s and 1080s, there appears to have been a renaissance of Norse religion with the magnificent Temple at Uppsala described in a contested account through an eye-witness by Adam of Bremen. Adam of Bremen relates of the Uppsala of the 1070s and describes it as a pagan cult centre with the enormous Temple at Uppsala containing wooden statues of Odin, Thor and Freyr.

Sometime in the 1080s, the Christian king Ingi was exiled for refusing to perform the sacrifices. Instead Blot-Sweyn was elected, but he was killed by Ingi who could then reclaim his throne.

Its great importance in Swedish tradition led to the location of Sweden's first Archbishopric in Gamla Uppsala in 1164. In practice, however, it had lost its strategic importance when it gradually lost ready access to navigable waters as the land rose owing to the constant post-glacial rebound.

== Archaeology ==
People have been buried in Gamla Uppsala for 2,000 years, since the area rose above water. Originally there were between 2,000 and 3,000 mounds in the area but most have become farmland, gardens and quarries. Today only 250 barrows remain.

In the parish there are more than 1,000 preserved archaeological remains, but many more have been removed by agriculture. There are cairns of splintered stone that reveal that the area was settled during the Nordic Bronze Age, but most of the grave fields are from the Iron Age and the Viking Age.

The great grave field south of the Royal Mounds is from the Roman Iron Age and the Germanic Iron Age. Near the vicarage, a few unburnt graves from the Viking Age have been excavated.

Under the present church in Gamla Uppsala have been found the remains of one or several large wooden buildings. Some archaeologists believe that they are the remains of the Temple of Uppsala, while others hold that comes from an early Christian wooden church. Churches were often built on pre-Christian sacred sites, though.

Adjacent to the present church there is a plateau of clay, the Plateau of the Royal Estate (Kungsgårdsplatån), on which archaeologists have found the remains of a large hall.

== The Royal Mounds ==
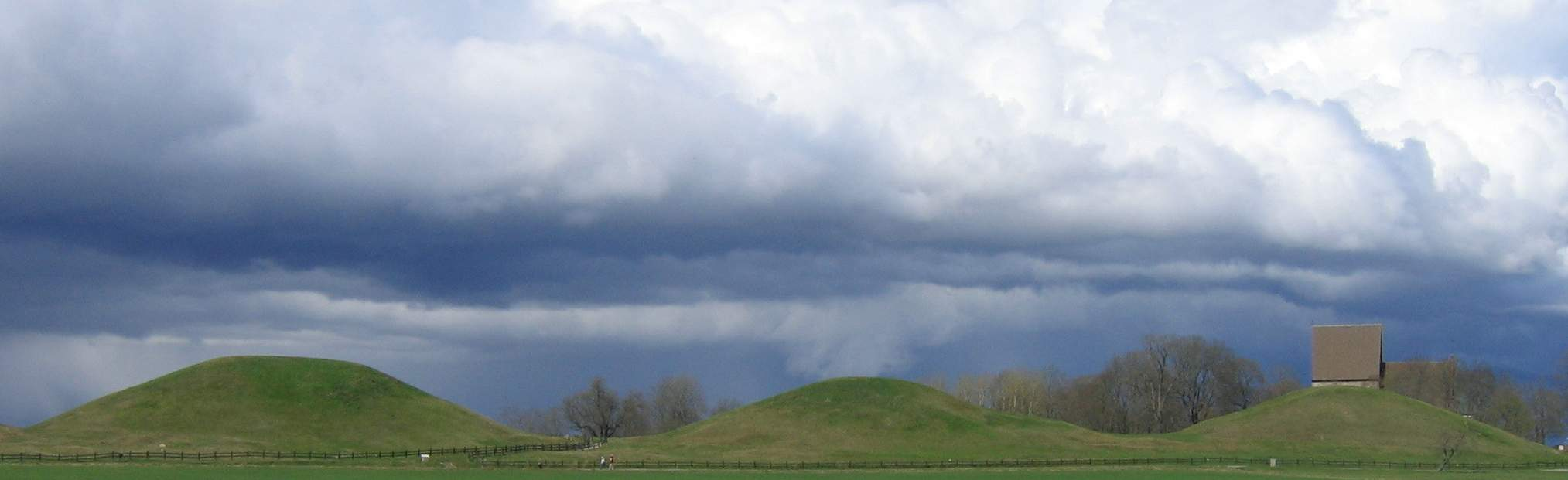
The three large "Royal Mounds" at Gamla Uppsala.

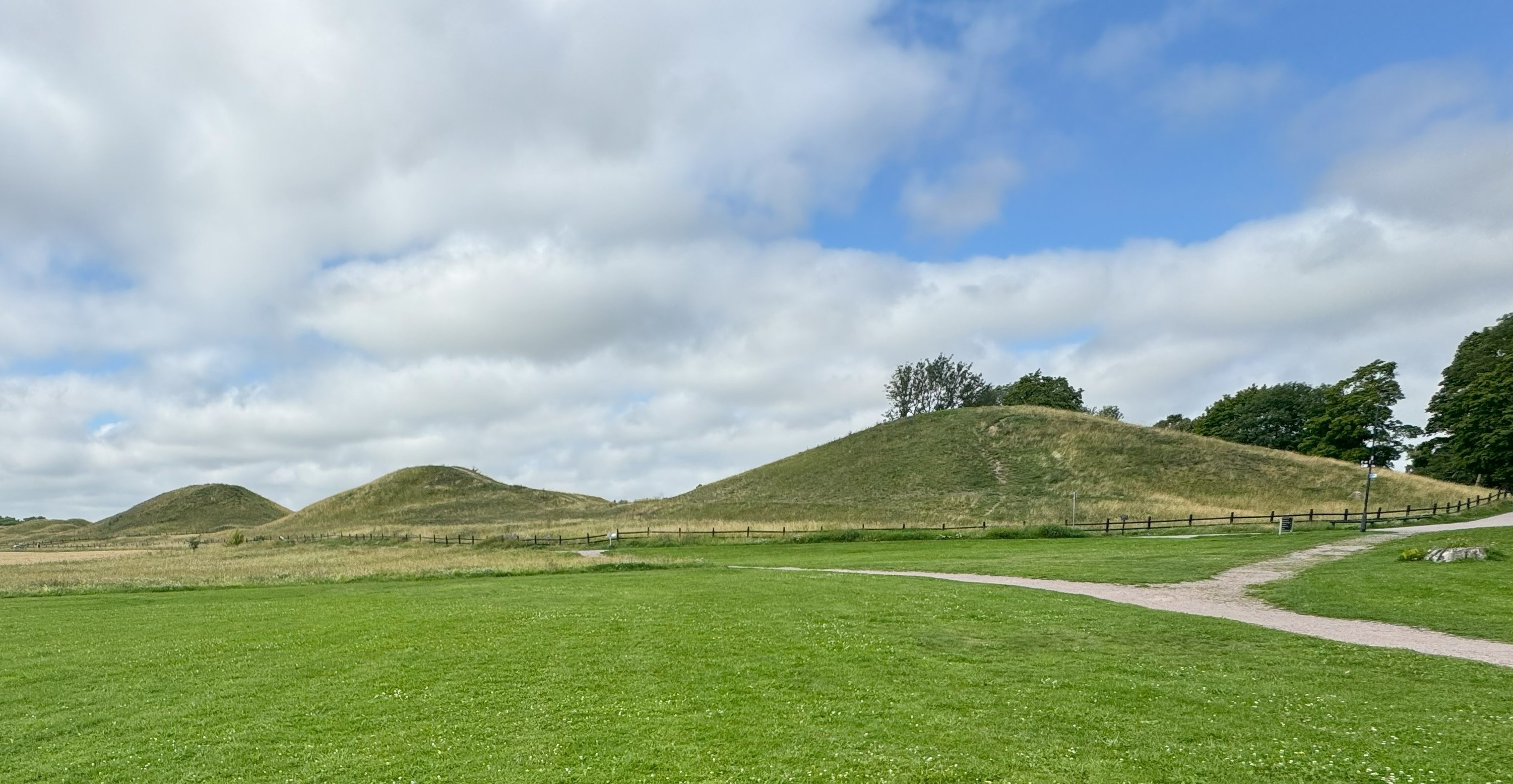
The Royal Mounds of Gamla Uppsala. L to R: Western Mound (King Adils’ Mound/Thor's Mound), Middle Mound (King Egil's Mound/Freyr's Mound) and Eastern Mound (King Aun's Mound/Odin's Mound). Dated to the older Vendel period, c. 550–625, through excavation findings.

The Royal Mounds (Kungshögarna) is the name of the three large barrows located in Gamla Uppsala. According to folklore, the three gods Thor, Odin and Freyr would be at rest in Kungshögarna or Uppsala högar (from the Old Norse word Haugr meaning mound or barrow; cognate English Howe). In the 19th and 20th centuries, they were speculated to hold the remains of three kings of the semi-legendary House of Ynglings and were thus known as Aun's Mound, Adils's Mound and Egil's Mound. Today their geographical locations are used instead and they are called the Eastern Mound, Middle Mound and Western Mound.

They are dated to the 5th and 6th centuries. As Sweden's oldest national symbols they are even depicted on the covers of books about the Swedish national identity. In the 6th century, Gamla Uppsala was the location of royal burials. The location was chosen carefully and in order to make them majestic. The tumuli were constructed on top of the ridge.

By burning the dead king and his armour, he was moved to Valhalla by the consuming force of the fire. The fire could reach temperatures of 1500 °C. The remains were covered with cobblestones and then a layer of gravel and sand and finally a thin layer of turf.

Thus he (Odin) established by law that all dead men should be burned, and their belongings laid with them upon the pile, and the ashes be cast into the sea or buried in the earth. Thus, said he, every one will come to Valhalla with the riches he had with him upon the pile; and he would also enjoy whatever he himself had buried in the earth. For men of consequence a mound should be raised to their memory, and for all other warriors who had been distinguished for manhood a standing stone; which custom remained long after Odin's time. [...] It was their faith that the higher the smoke arose in the air, the higher he would be raised whose pile it was; and the richer he would be, the more property that was consumed with him.

—Ynglinga saga

=== An old controversy and its solution ===
In the 1830s, some scholars claimed that the mounds were pure natural formations and not barrows. This affront to ancient Swedish national symbols could not be accepted by the future Swedish king Karl XV and in order to remove any doubt, he decided to start an excavation.

The task was given to Bror Emil Hildebrand, the director-general of the National Archives. In 1846, he undertook the excavation of the nine-metres-tall (30 ft) Eastern mound with the hope of finding the grave of a Swedish king of old.

==== The eastern mound ====
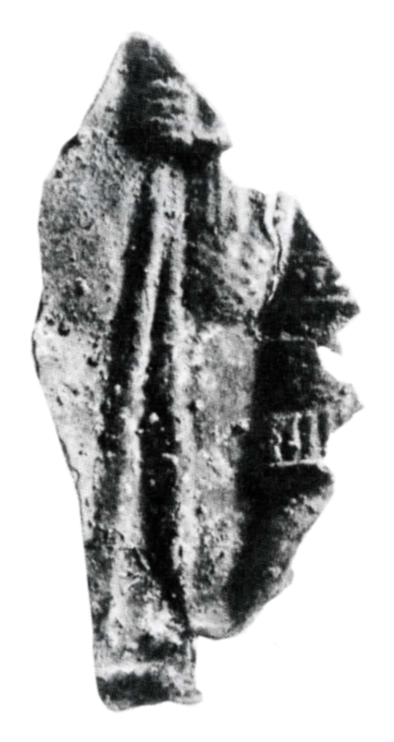
Helmet fragment from the East Mound.

The excavation was complex and generated a lot of publicity. A 25-meter-long (82-foot) tunnel was dug into the mound, where they found a pot of clay filled with burnt bones and around it there were the remains of the charred grave offerings.

Among the most important finds in the eastern mound were many fragments of decorated bronze panels with a dancing warrior carrying a spear. These panels have probably adorned a helmet of the Vendel Age type, common in Uppland (the only foreign examples being the Sutton Hoo and Staffordshire helmets). There were also finds of gold which probably had adorned a scramasax, but according to another interpretation, they were part of a belt. The dead was also given several glass beakers, a tafl game, a comb and a hone.

Most scholars agree that the mound was either raised for a woman or for a young man and a woman as the remains of a woman and boy were found. Hildebrand reburied most of the remains, so a new excavation will need to be undertaken before the controversy can be settled. What is quite certain is that the dead belonged to a royal dynasty.

==== The western mound ====
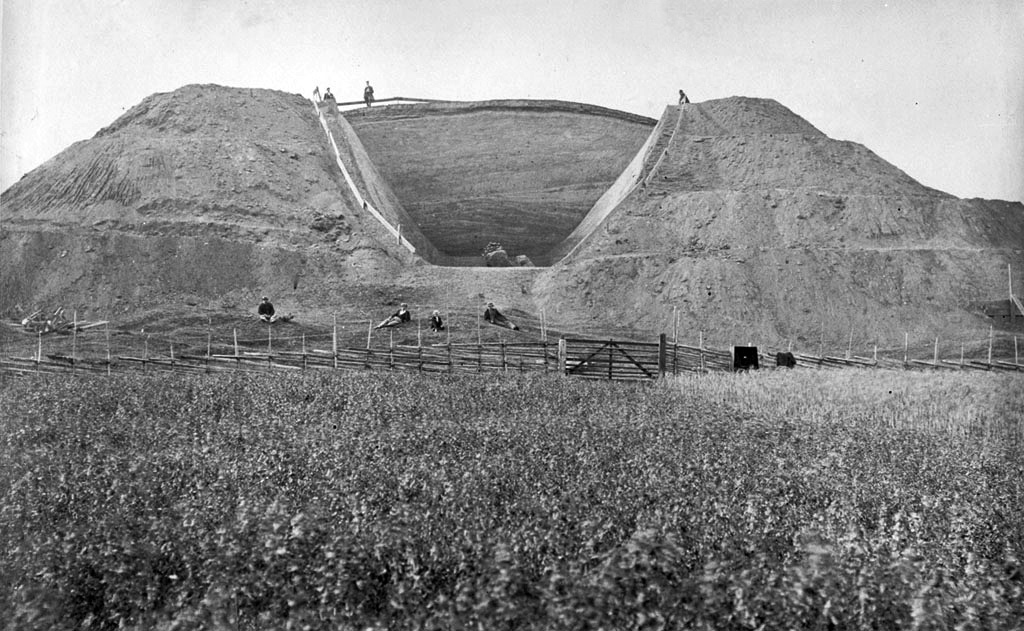
The 1874 excavation in Gamla Uppsala.

In 1874, Hildebrand started an excavation of the western mound and opened an enormous shaft right into the cairn in the centre of the mound. Under the cobble stones, there were the charred remains of the funeral fire.

In the western mound were found the remains of a man and animals, probably for food during the journey. The remains of a warrior's equipment were found. Luxurious weapons and other objects, both domestic and imported, show that the buried man was very powerful. These remains include a Frankish sword adorned with gold and garnets and a board game with Roman pawns of ivory. He was dressed in a costly suit made of Frankish cloth with golden threads, and he wore a belt with a sumptuous buckle. There were four cameos from the Middle East which were probably part of a casket. The finds show the distant contacts of the people of Uppland in the 6th century.

== Gamla Uppsala Church ==
Gamla Uppsala Church (Gamla Uppsala kyrka) was the seat of the Swedish Archbishopric until 1273, when the archiepiscopal seat was moved to Östra Aros, which was subsequently renamed Uppsala at papal request. The old cathedral was probably begun in the 11th century and completed in the 12th century. The stone building may have been preceded by a wooden church and, before that, by the large Temple at Uppsala. After a fire in 1240, the nave and transepts of the cathedral were removed, leaving only the choir and central tower. The later addition of the sacristy and porch gave the church much of its present exterior appearance. Vaults and chalk paintings were added in the 15th century. Among its medieval wooden sculptures are three crucifixes dating from the 12th, 13th and 15th centuries.

Archbishop Valerius was buried in the church. King Eric IX of Sweden was also buried there before his remains were moved to Uppsala Cathedral. Astronomer, physicist and mathematician Anders Celsius (1701–1744) was buried at Gamla Uppsala Church alongside his grandfather, Magnus Celsius (1621–1679).

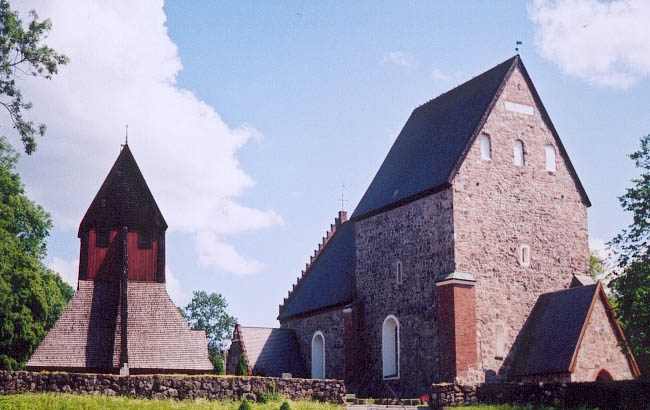
Gamla Uppsala Church from the west

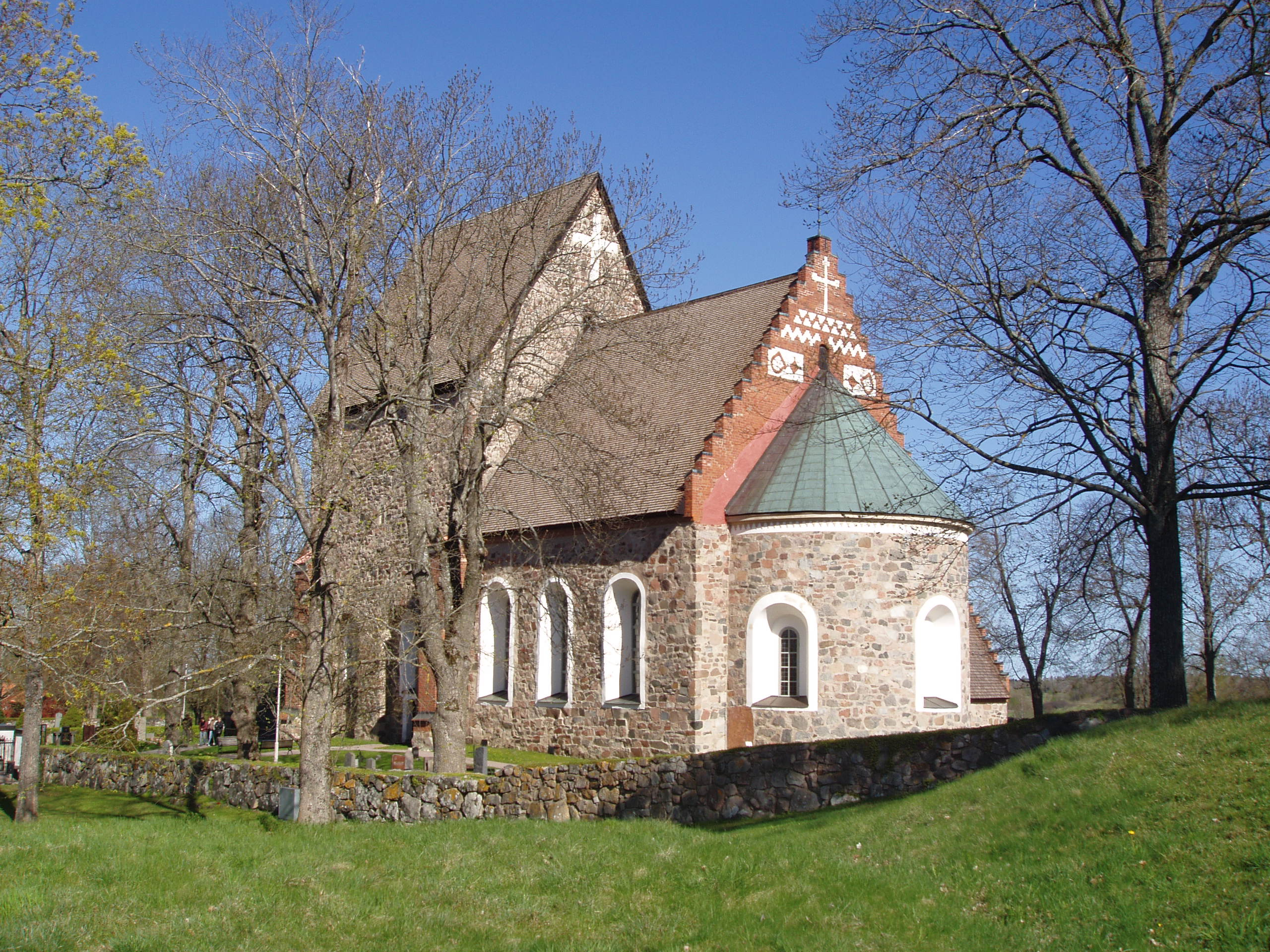
Gamla Uppsala Church from the south-east

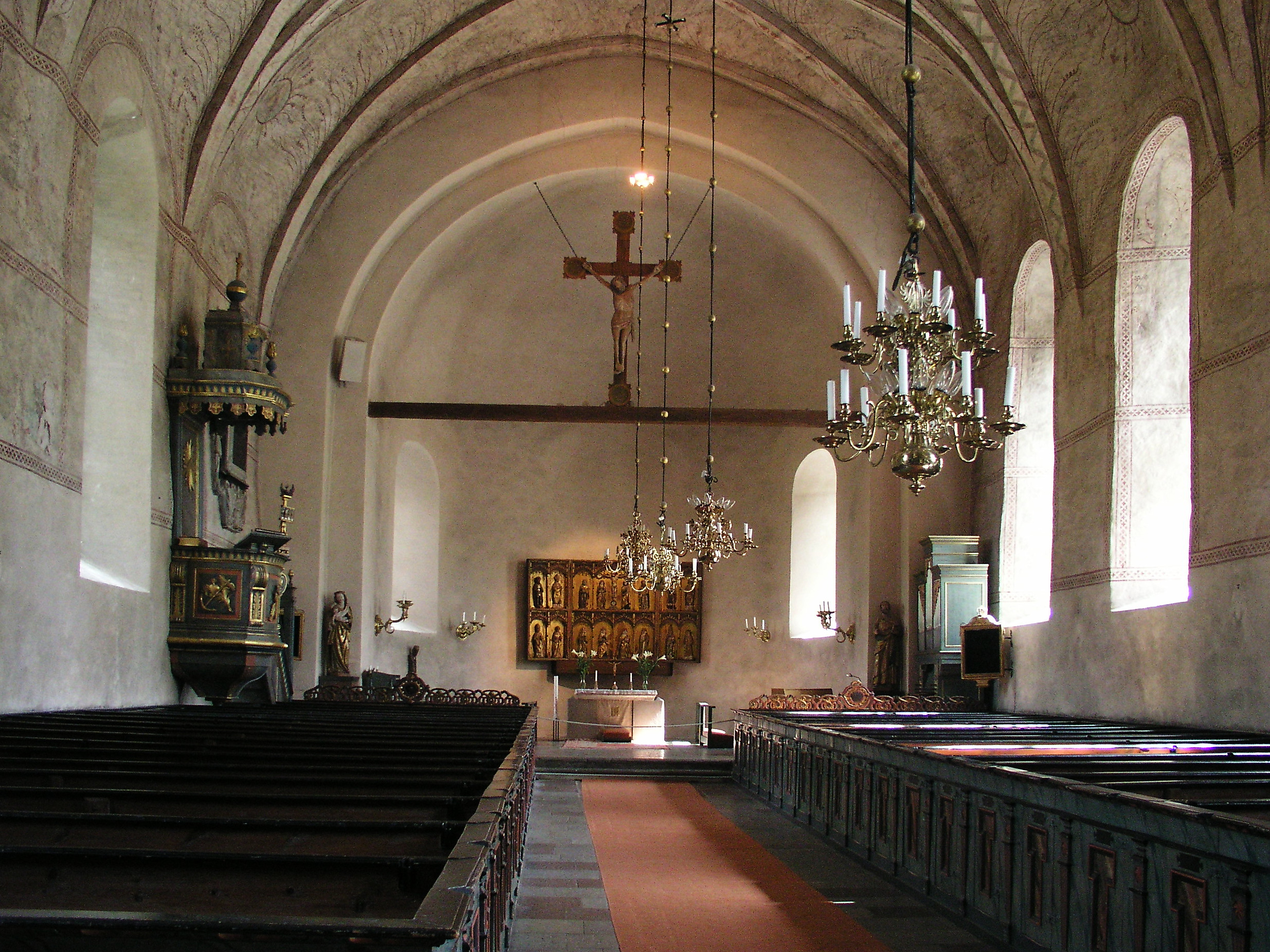
Interior of Gamla Uppsala Church

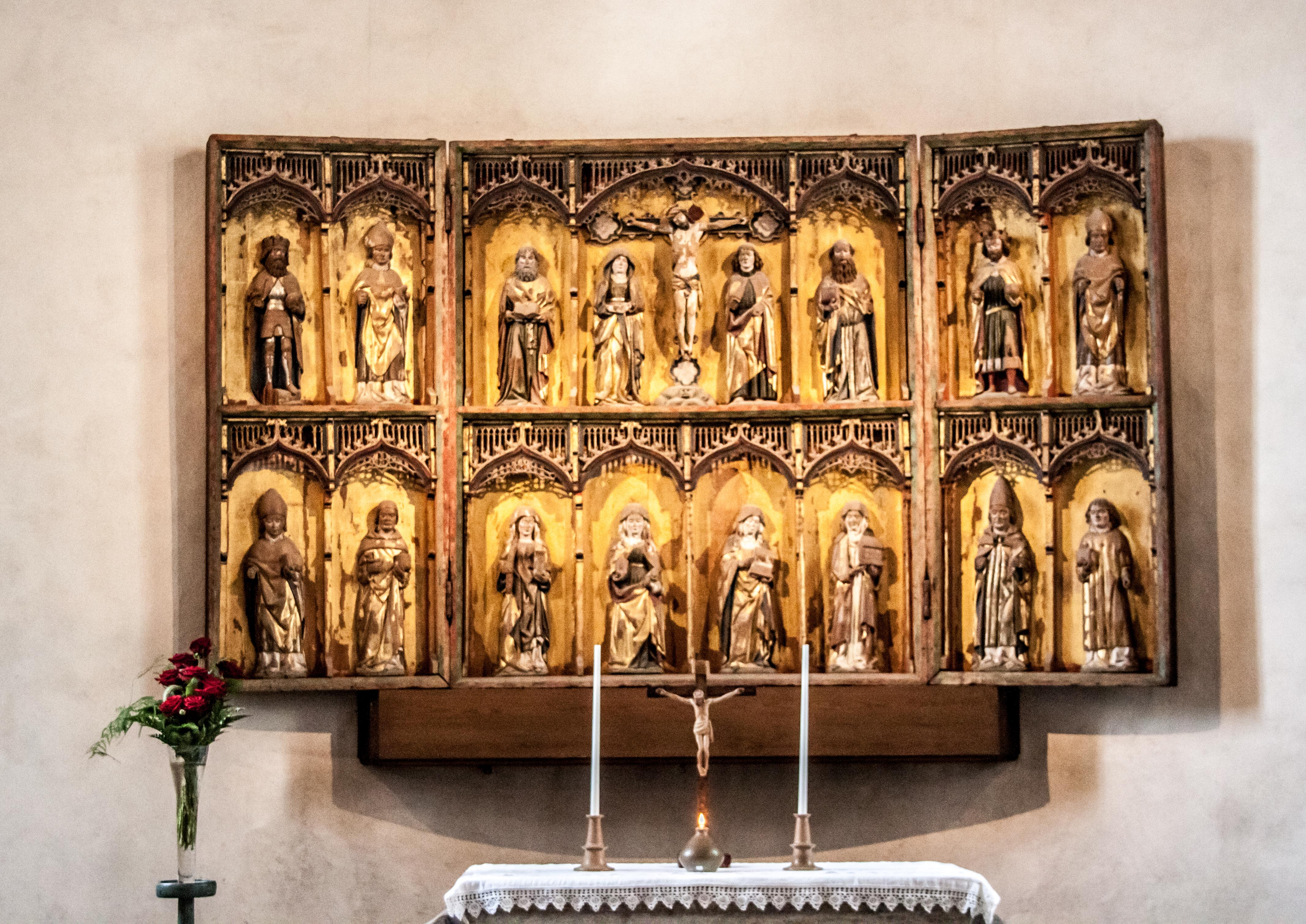
Altarpiece

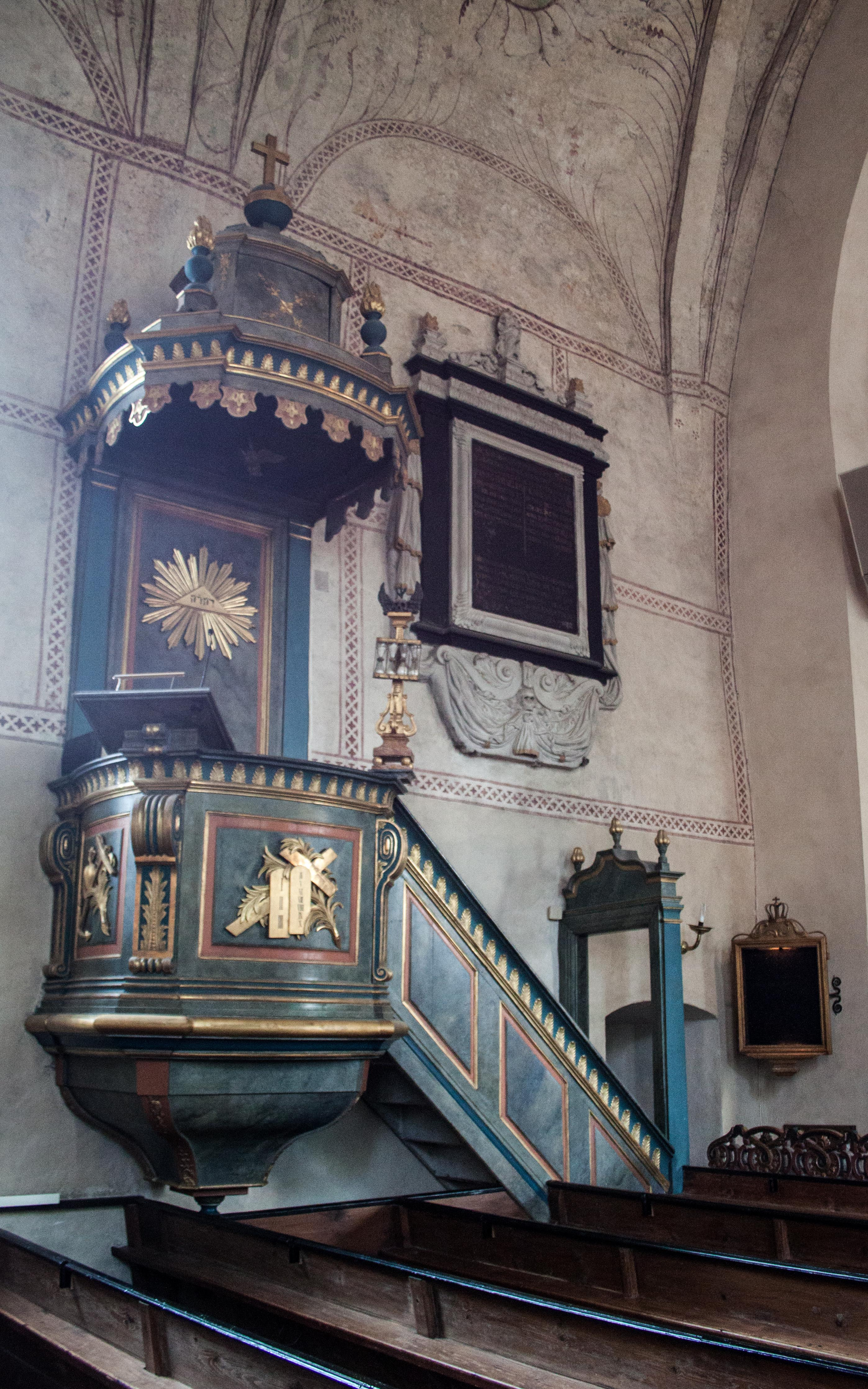
Pulpit

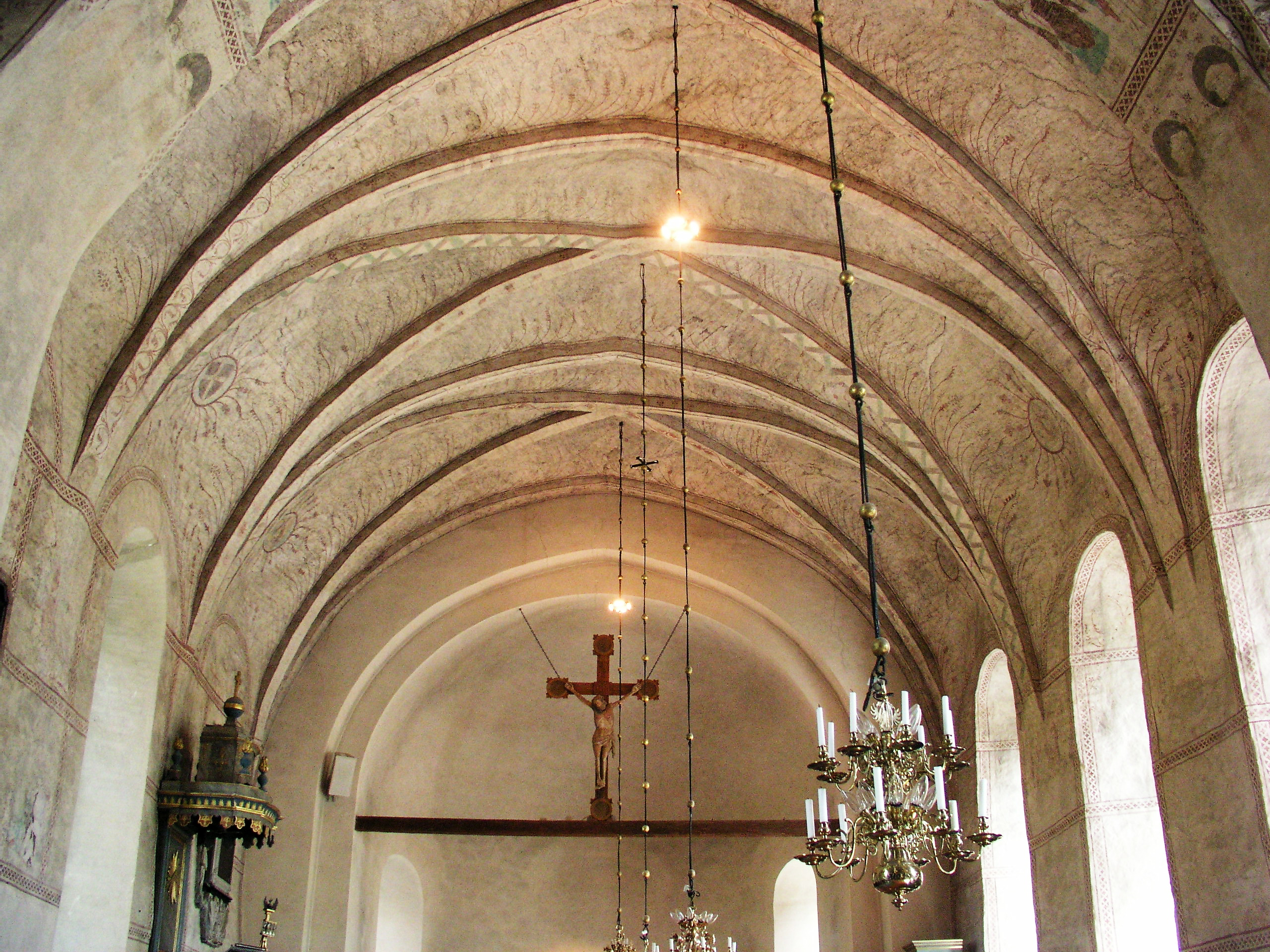
Nave ceiling

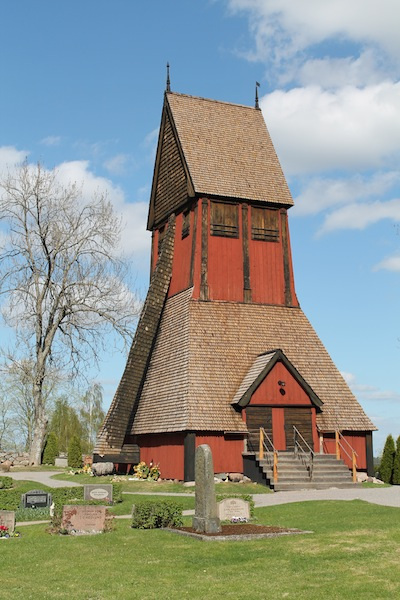
Bell tower
