= Gamla Uppsala museum =

Archaeological museum in Gamla Uppsala

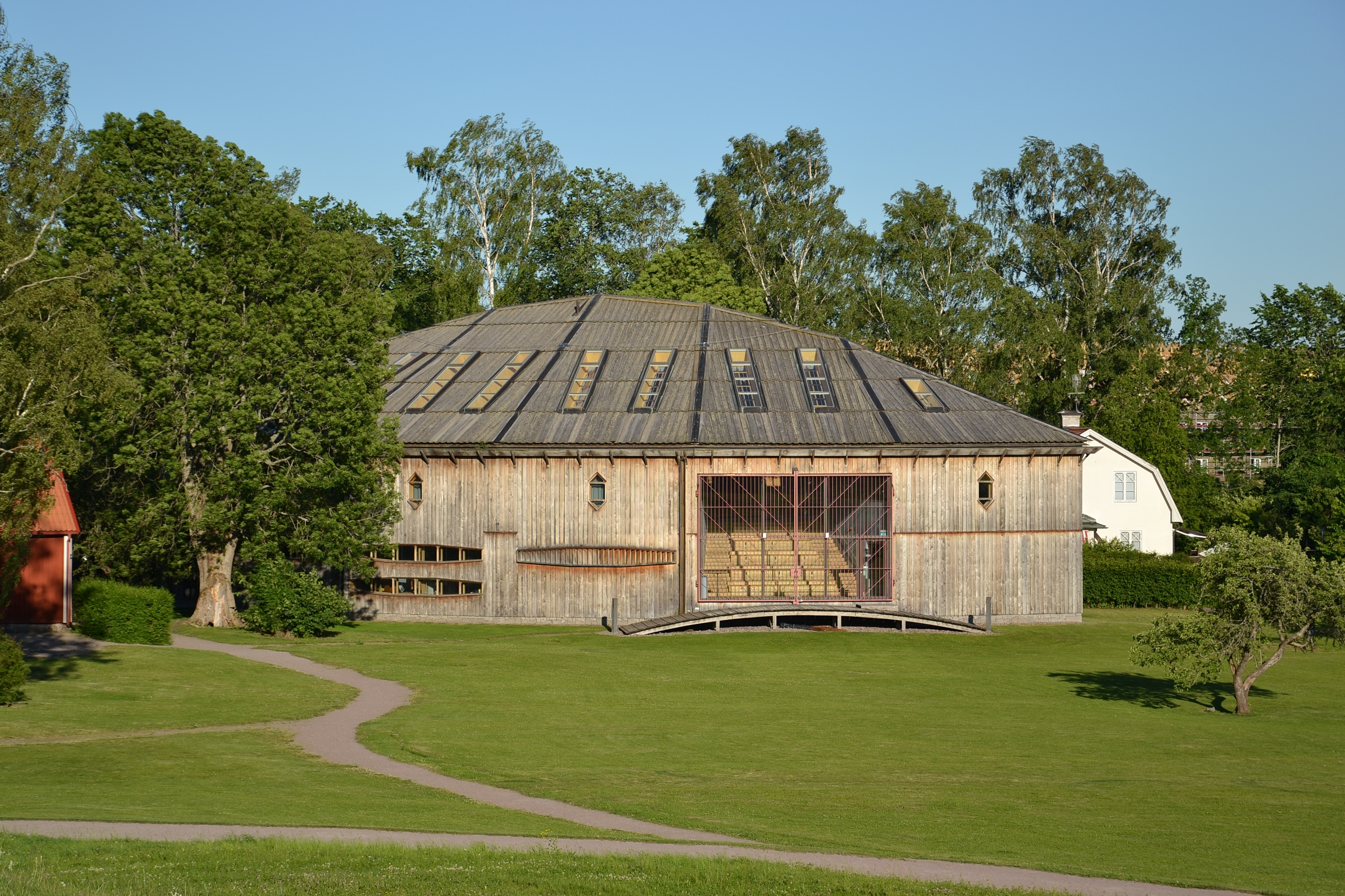
- Established: 2000; 26 years ago
- Location: Gamla Uppsala, Uppsala, Sweden
- Coordinates: 59°53′51.9″N 17°38′1.06″E
- Visitors: 28,976 (2016)
- Website: raa.se raa.se/in-english/

Gamla Uppsala museum is an archaeological museum in Gamla Uppsala, in the northern part of Uppsala, Sweden.

The museum focuses on the history and archaeology of Gamla Uppsala during the Vendel Period and Viking Age. Gamla Uppsala was an important religious and cultural centre in Sweden from approximately the 5th to the 13th century. The site is associated with the legendary Temple at Uppsala and contains several large burial mounds.

The museum building was designed by Swedish architect Carl Nyrén (1917–2011). It opened in 2000 and is operated by the Swedish National Heritage Board (Swedish: Riksantikvarieämbetet).

== Gallery ==
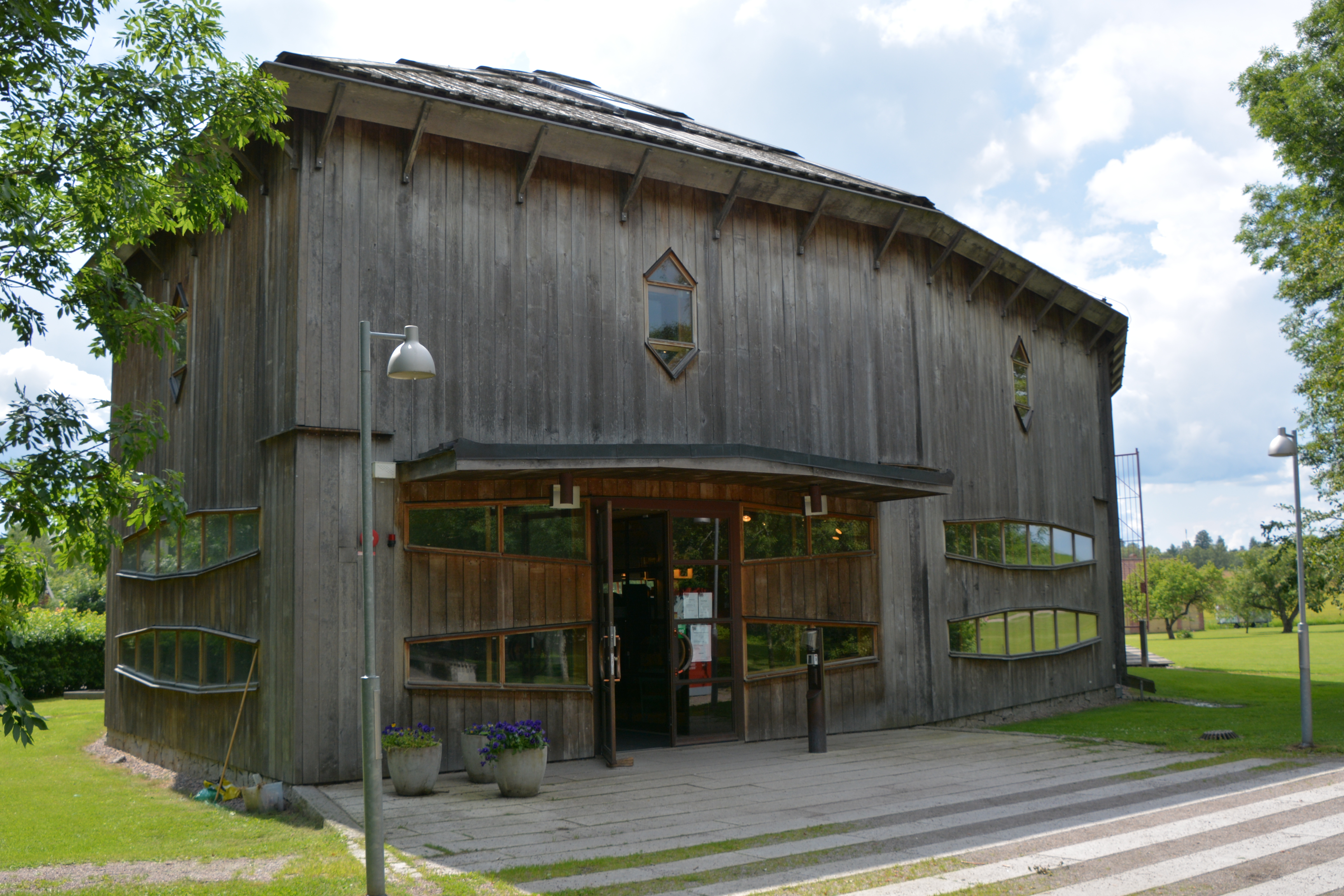
Entrance

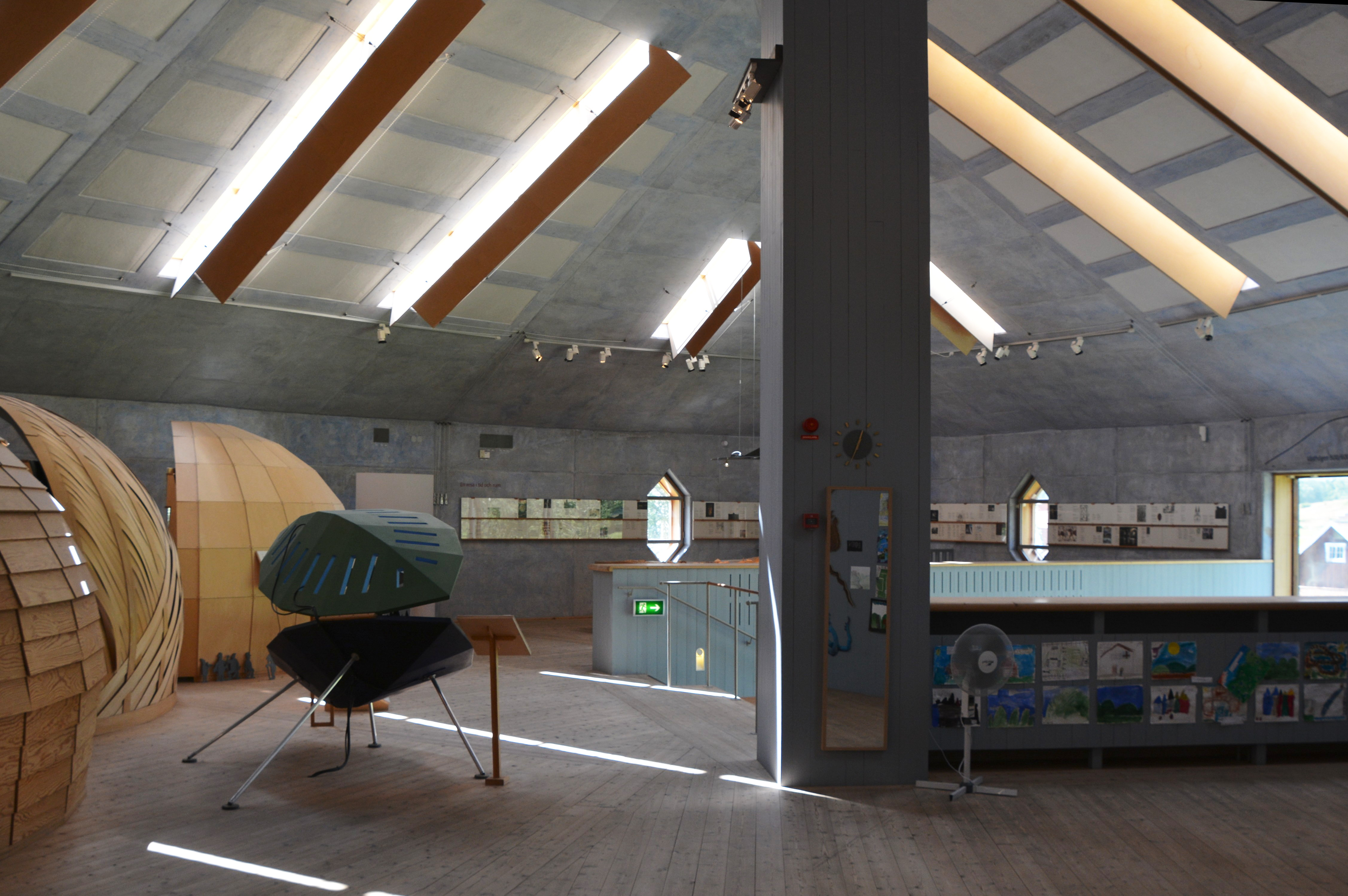
Exhibition hall upstairs

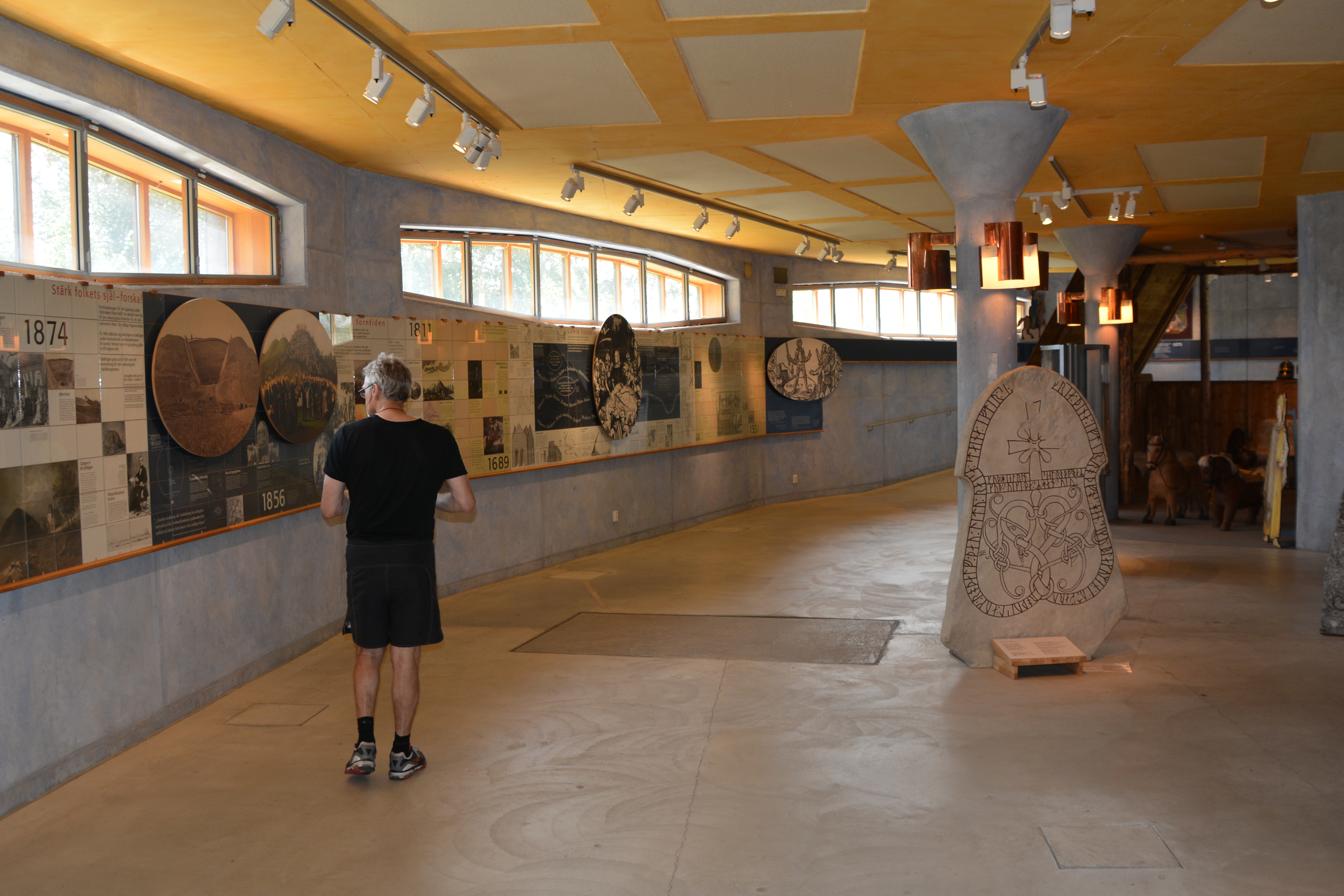
Exhibition hall downstairs

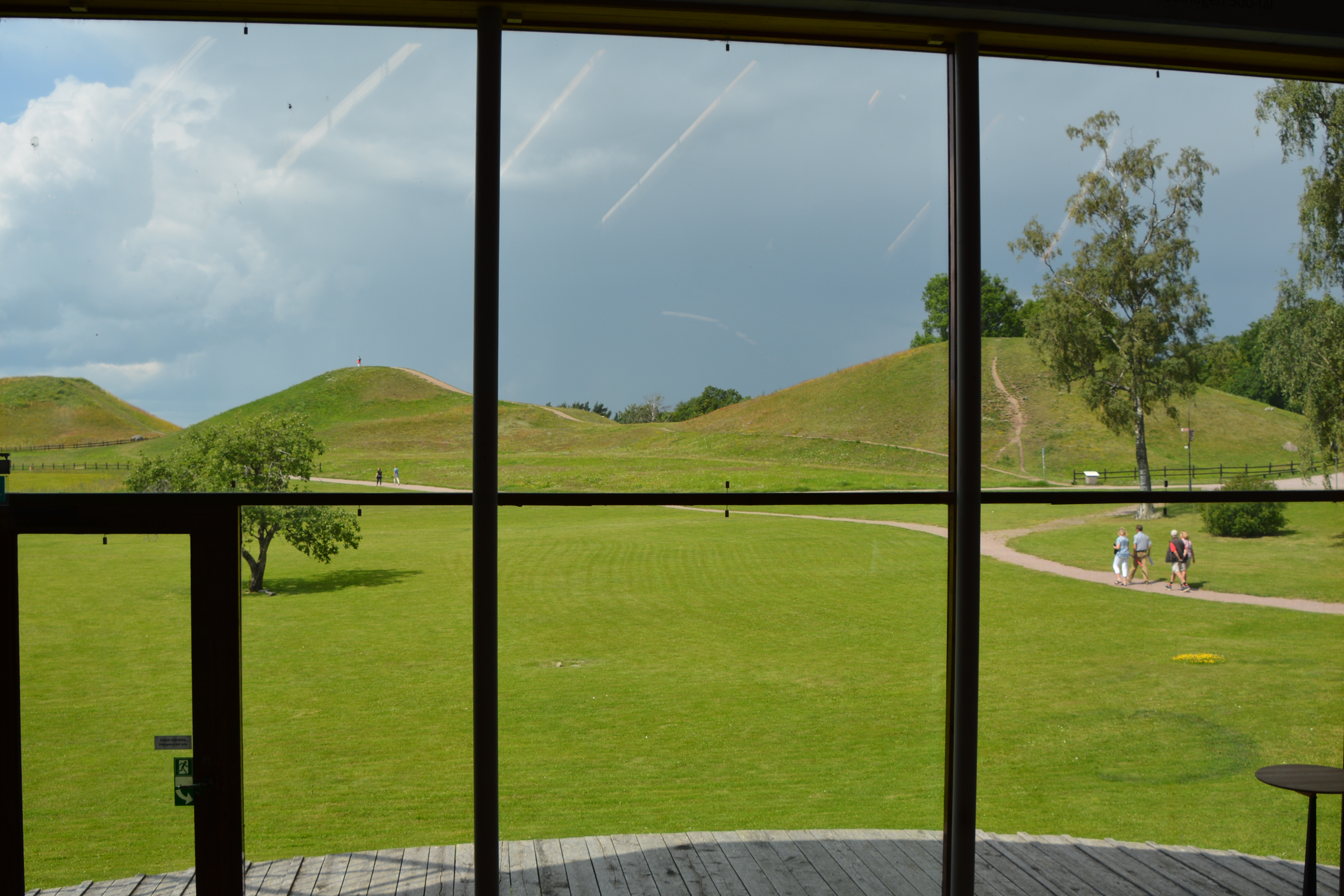
View of Gamla Uppsala mounds

== See also ==
- List of runestones
