= Eugene Maslov =

Russian billiards coach

Yevgeny Valentinovich Maslov (Russian: Евгений Валентинович Маслов; 1945 – 2 November 2011), anglicized as Eugene, was a Russian billiards coach. He trained several notable players and coaches. His students included Diana Mironova, George Maslov and Vadim Berdyshev.

Maslov died on 2 November 2011 aged 66.
