= Luigi Belloli =

Italian Catholic bishop (1923–2011)

- Bishop of the Diocese of Anagni-Alatri (emeritus)
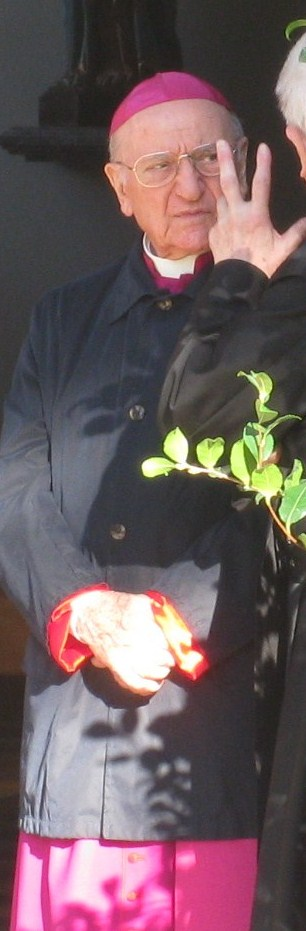
- Church: Catholic Church
- See: Roman Catholic Diocese of Anagni-Alatri
- In office: 1978–1999
- Predecessor: Umberto Florenzani
- Successor: Francesco Lambiasi
- Previous post: Prelate

Orders
- Ordination: 15 June 1946

Personal details
- Born: 25 July 1923 Inveruno, Italy
- Died: 5 November 2011 (aged 88) Inveruno

Luigi Belloli (25 July 1923 – 5 November 2011) was an Italian Prelate of the Catholic Church.

Luigi Belloli was born in Inveruno, Italy, ordained a priest by Cardinal Alfredo Ildefonso Schuster on 15 June 1946. Belloli was appointed bishop of the Diocese of Anagni-Alatri on 7 December 1987 and ordained on 6 January 1988. Belloli would retire from Anagni-Alatri on 6 March 1999.

Belloli died in his hometown of Inveruno on 5 November 2011.

== See also ==
- Diocese of Anagni-Alatri
