= Martin Schroyens =

Belgian footballer

Personal information
- Date of birth: 16 February 1930
- Date of death: 26 November 2011 (aged 81)

International career
Years	Team	Apps	(Gls)
1952	Belgium	3	(0)

Martin Schroyens (16 February 1930 – 26 November 2011) was a Belgian footballer. He played in three matches for the Belgium national football team in 1952.
