= Čestmír Vejdělek =

Čestmír Vejdělek (Czech pronunciation: [ˈtʃɛstmiːr ˈvɛjɟɛlɛk]; October 8, 1925 – November 14, 2011) was a Czechoslovak writer and former editor. In the years 1951-1967 he served as the director of the publishing house Mlada fronta. In 1967 he became director of the State Publishing House children's book (later a publishing house called Albatros). Due to politics from 1972 to 1977 he worked as a laborer. In 1977 he emigrated to the then Federal Republic of Germany, where he worked as a writer and publicist. He was involved in the exile magazine Listy. He is also the author of several science fiction novels.

He was largely a literary writer, but his Návrat z ráje (Return from Paradise) is of some interest to science fiction. It has been described as a complex dystopia concerning a computer-ruled society.

== Bibliography ==
- The Encyclopedia of Science Fiction, page 292
