= Esperanza Pérez Labrador =

Cuban-born Argentine human rights activist

Esperanza Catalina Pérez de Labrador (1922 – November 13, 2011) was a Cuban-born Argentine human rights activist and leading member of the Mothers of the Plaza de Mayo. Labrador began her advocacy on behalf of victims of the Dirty War after her husband, Victor Labrador, and her son, 28-year-old Palmiro, were killed in the Dirty War during the 1970s. Another son, Miguel, disappeared and was never seen again.

Esperanza Pérez Labrador was born in Camagüey, Cuba, to Spanish parents. Her mother died while giving birth and her father, unable to take care of her, gave her up to a Cuban family, the Mestrils. Despite objections from the Mestrils and Esperanza Pérez, her father regained custody of her seven years later. She moved with her father to Spain and then immigrated to Argentina in 1950. She married a Spanish husband, Víctor Labrador.

Miguel Ángel Labrador, her 25-year-old youngest son, left home on September 13, 1976, towards the beginning of the Dirty War, and was never seen again. Just two months later, Labrador's husband, Víctor, their 28-year-old son, Palmiro Labrador, and his friend, Edith Graciela Koatz, were killed on November 10, 1976.

Devastated, but determined to find out what happened to her family, Esperanza Perez Labrador held a vigil outside the headquarters of General Leopoldo Galtieri, who commanded government sponsored death squads. At one point, Labrador grabbed Galtieri's uniform and publicly shouted "¡Asesino, criminal!" to him. The actions of Labrador reportedly prompted Spanish judge Baltasar Garzón to open a criminal case against perpetrators of the Dirty War and the Argentinian dictatorship in 1996.

Esperanza Pérez Labrador moved to Madrid, Spain, where she lived with her daughter, Manoli. She died in Madrid on November 13, 2011, at the age 89.
