= Paul Seitz =

Vietnamese prelate of the Catholic Church (1919–2011)

Paul-Léon Seitz
- Bishop Diocese of Kontum (Emeritus)
- Church: Roman Catholic Church
- See: Diocese of Kontum
- In office: 1952–1975
- Predecessor: Jean-Liévin-Joseph Sion
- Successor: Alexis Phạm Văn Lộc
- Previous post(s): Priest

Orders
- Ordination: 4 July 1937 by Georges-Marie de Jonghe d'Ardoye
- Consecration: 3 October 1952 by John Jarlath Dooley

Personal details
- Born: 22 December 1906; Le Havre, France
- Died: 23 February 1984 (aged 77); Paris, France

Paul-Léon Seitz (22 December 1906 - 23 February 1984) was a French bishop in the Catholic Church. He was ordained as a bishop in 1952 and named as the titular bishop of the church's Catula titular see. From 1960 to 1975, he served as the Bishop of Kontum, a Central Highlands region of Vietnam known for its Montagnard tribes.

Seitz was dedicated to medical and social welfare for the Montagnaard people. He was active in fundraising efforts on behalf of the tribespeople, securing donations from England and the United States.

During the Vietnam War, Seitz sought relief for the many thousands of refugees that were displaced by the Viet Cong.
