= Bernd and Reiner Methe =

Handball referees

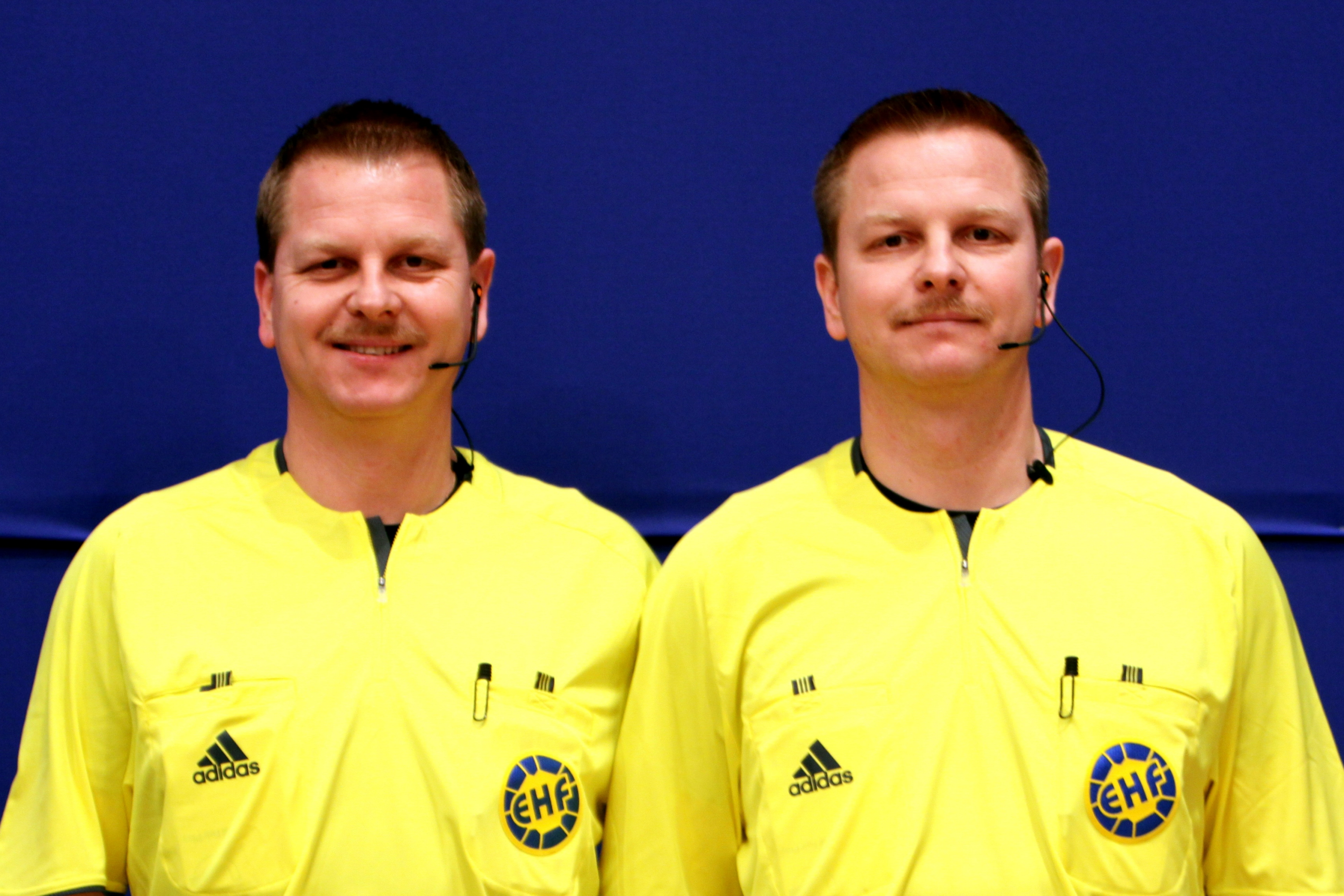
- Bernd Methe with Reiner Methe
- Born: 1 June 1964
- Died: 11 November 2011 (aged 47); Between Empfingen and Haigerloch, Baden-Württemberg
- Occupation: Handball referee
- Years active: 1988–2011

Bernd and Reiner Methe (1 June 1964 – 11 November 2011) were German twins and handball referees. They refereed for the German Handball-Bundesliga and in international competitions until their deaths in a car crash in November 2011. Their highest profile match was the final of the 2010 European Men's Handball Championship.

== Biography ==
The Methe twins were born in 1964. Bernd was married to Susanne and Reiner to Petra on the same day. Bernd had one child and Reiner two. They lived 50 meters apart from each other in the town of Vellmar and both worked for Mercedes-Benz in Kassel.

=== Refereeing careers ===
In 1987 the brothers took up refereeing, officiating as a pair from 1988. The brothers reached Handball-Bundesliga level in 1993. Between 1993 and 2011 they took charge of 670 national league matches.

The Methe brothers began refereeing international handball in 1998, refereeing all of their matches together. They refereed 206 international matches.

They refereed the 2010 European Men's Handball Championship Final between Croatia and France.

=== Deaths ===
The Methe brothers died in a car crash on Bundesstraße 463 between Empfingen and Haigerloch, Baden-Württemberg. They were travelling to a Handball-Bundesliga match between HBW Balingen-Weilstetten and SC Magdeburg. The Mercedes-Benz E-Class car they had collected the day before collided with a furniture truck. Local prosecutors announced that they were investigating the cause of the crash, including the involvement of another vehicle. The match they were due to officiate was cancelled after they did not arrive.
