= Enric Garriga i Trullols =

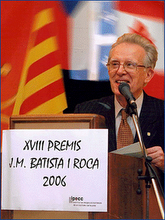
- Born: May 31, 1926; Barcelona, Spain
- Died: November 17, 2011 (aged 85); Barcelona, Spain

Enric Garriga i Trullols (May 31, 1926 – November 17, 2011) was a Spanish Catalan independentist and activist for the Occitan Nation. Trullols served as the founder and president of several Catalan organizations, including the Cercle d'Agermanament Occitano-Català (CAOC) and the Institut de Projecció Exterior de la Cultura Catalana (IPECC).

Trullols began his career as a chemical engineer. He participated in the Congreso de Cultura Catalana from 1975 to 1977. Trullols became further involved with the Catalan independence movement when he joined the Socialists' Party of Catalonia in preparation for the 1977 elections.

In the mid-1970s, Trullois co-founded the Institut de Projecció Exterior de la Cultura Catalana (IPECC), and later served as the institute's president until his death in 2011. Under Trullois, the IPECC spearheaded the construction of monuments to Catalan national heroes around the world, including Belgium, Germany and Argentina. In 1977, Trullois founded the Cercle d'Agermanament Occitano-Català (CAOC), which promoted relations between Catalan and Occitan cultural institutions and activists. He also promoted the preservation and use of the Aranese dialect in Val d'Aran, Catalonia, and southern France.

Enric Garriga i Trullols died in Barcelona on November 17, 2011, at the age of 85.
