= Diana Mironova =

Russian billiards player

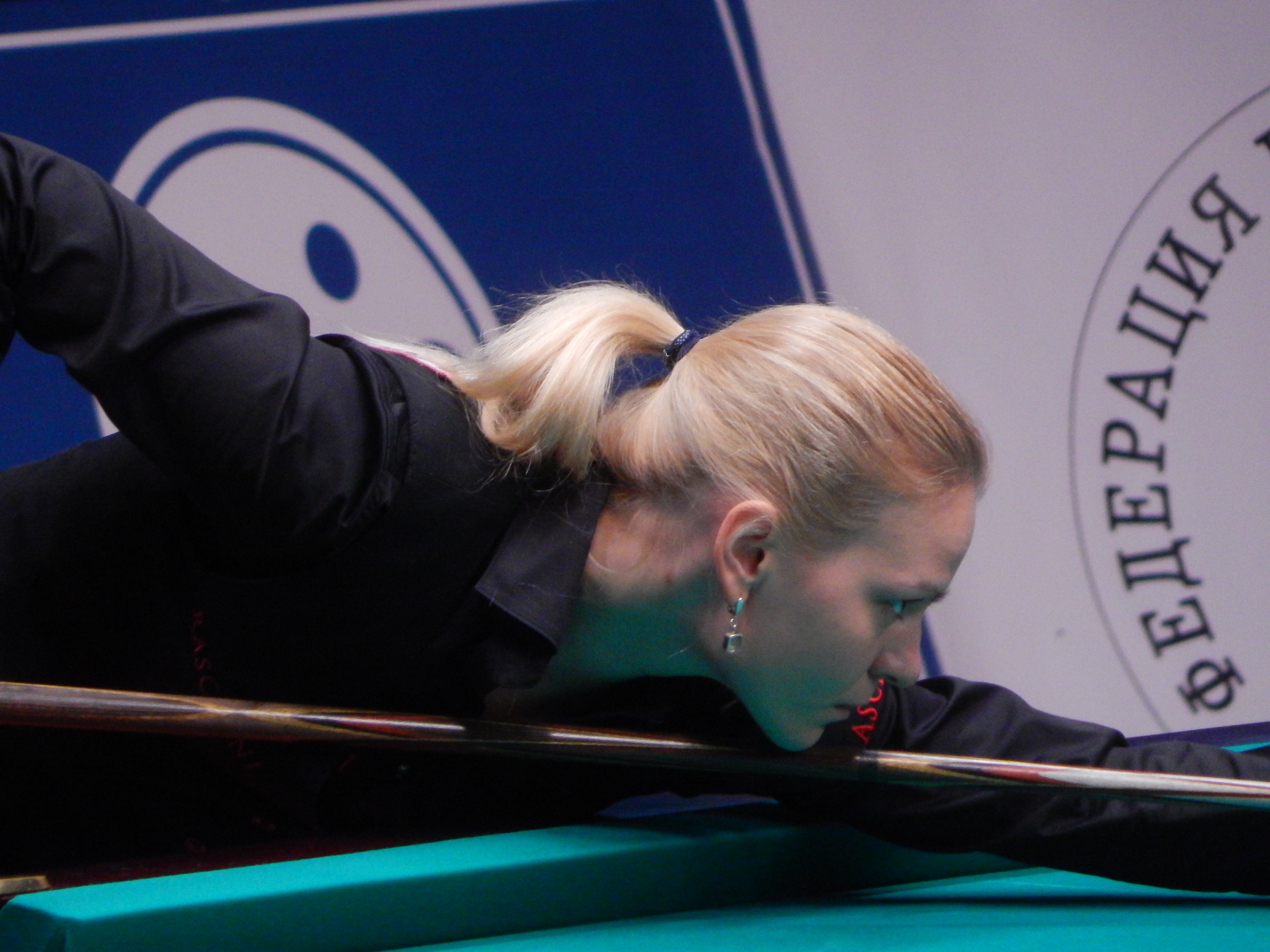

Personal information
- Born: 9 May 1996 (age 29)

Sport
- Country: Russia
- Sport: Russian billiards
- Coached by: Sergey Baurov

Achievements and titles
- World finals: 9

Diana Ildarovna Mironova (Russian: Диана Ильдаровна Миронова, 9 May 1996, Moscow) is a Russian billiards player, the nine-time World champion in Russian pyramid.

== Career ==
Diana became a billiards player at the age of six, although her father sent Diana to a billiards group two years before. The main coach of Diana Mironova is Sergey Baurov. Mironova won her first World title in 2010.

== Links ==
- Media related to Diana Mironova at Wikimedia Commons
- A profile at the Moscow Unite of Billiards
