= Ruslan Akhtakhanov =

Chechen poet and academic (c. 1953–2011)

- Born: 14 March 1953 Znamenskoye, Soviet Union
- Died: 16 November 2011 (aged 58) Moscow, Russia
- Occupation: Poet, Academic

Ruslan Abuevich Akhtakhanov (Russian: Руслан Ахтаханов; c. 1953 – 16 November 2011) was a Chechen poet and academic.

== Early life ==
Akhtakhanov was born in Znamenskoye, Chechen Republic.

== Career and views ==
Akhtakhanov was a professor and vice-rector at the Modern Humanitarian Academy in Moscow and a poet. He was an outspoken opponent of Chechen separatism and a supporter of Chechnya's president Ramzan Kadyrov.

He was a member of the Russian Union of Writers.

== Death and burial ==
Akhtakhanov was shot and killed in Moscow in 2011 by an unknown assailant. He was 58. His body was buried in his hometown, Znamenskoye, on 17 November 2011.
