= Alexis Phạm Văn Lộc =

Vietnamese prelate of the Catholic Church (1919–2011)

The Most Reverend Alexis Phạm Văn Lộc
- Bishop of Kon Tum
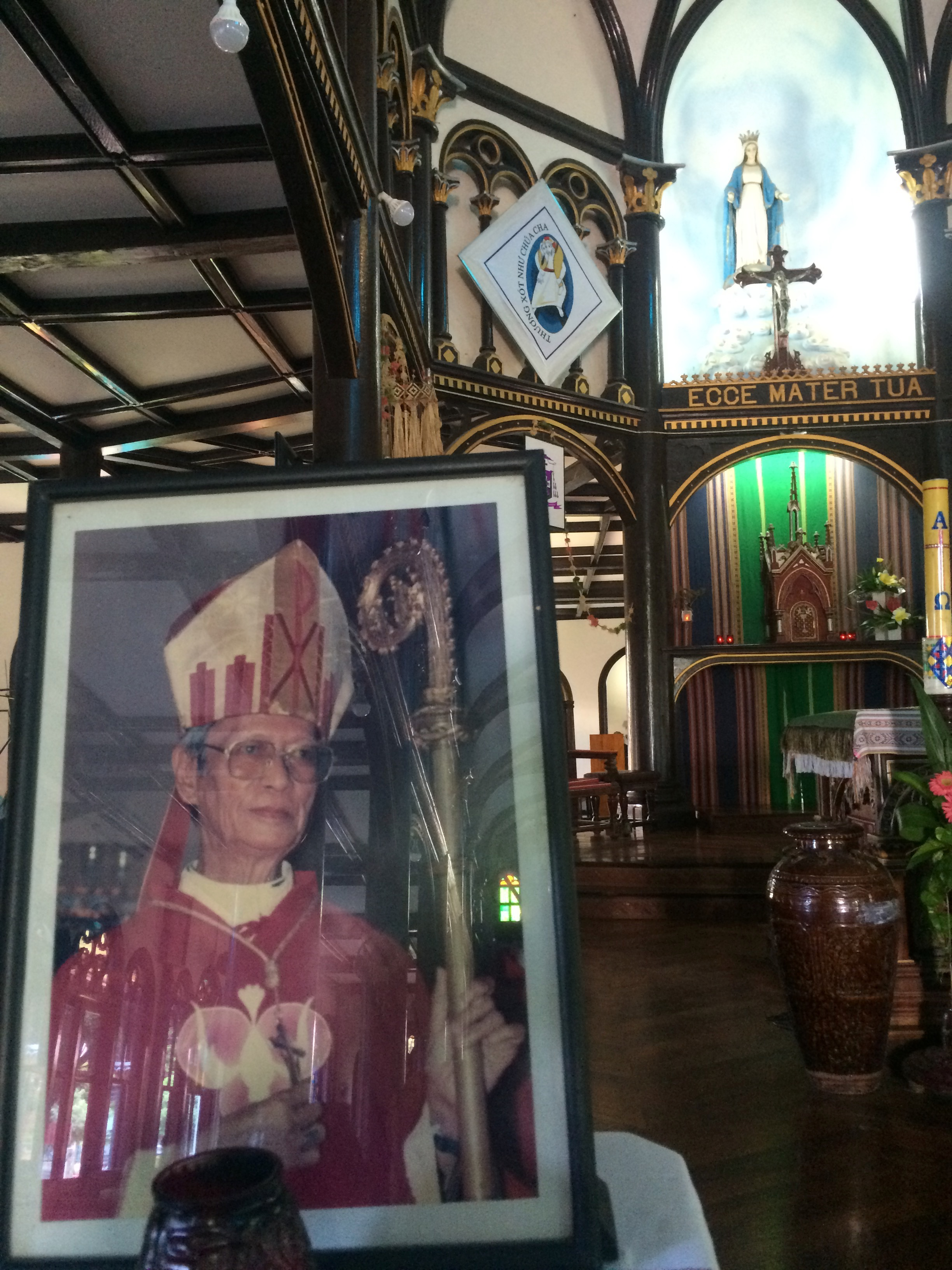
- Photo of Alexis Pham Van Loc inside the Kontum Cathedral
- Church: Catholic
- Province: Huế
- See: Kon Tum
- Appointed: 27 March 1975 (as Coadjutor)
- Installed: 2 October 1975
- Term ended: 8 April 1995
- Predecessor: Paul Léon Seitz MEP
- Successor: Pierre Trần Thanh Chung
- Previous post: Priest

Orders
- Ordination: 21 August 1951 by Jean-Baptiste Urrutia MEP
- Consecration: 27 March 1975 by Paul Léon Seitz MEP

Personal details
- Born: 17 March 1919 Huế, French Indochina
- Died: 17 November 2011 (aged 92) Kon Tum, Việt Nam

Alexis Phạm Văn Lộc (17 March 1919 – 17 November 2011) was a Vietnamese Bishop of the Catholic Church.

Lộc was born in Huế and ordained a priest on 21 August 1951. He was appointed coadjutor bishop of the Diocese of Kontum, as well as titular bishop of Respecta, on 27 March 1975, and ordained bishop on the same day. He succeeded Paul-Léon Seitz as Bishop of Kontum on 2 October 1975 and retired on 8 April 1995.
