= Noel Baker =

Australian rules footballer (1933–2011)

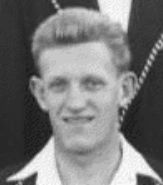

Personal information
- Full name: Noel Baker
- Born: 22 December 1933
- Died: 20 November 2011 (aged 77)
- Original team: Mentone Grammar
- Height: 179 cm (5 ft 10 in)
- Weight: 80.5 kg (177 lb)

Playing career^{1}
Years	Club	Games (Goals)
1953, 1955	Melbourne	8 (0)
- ^{1} Playing statistics correct to the end of 1955.

Noel Baker (22 December 1933 – 20 November 2011) was an Australian rules footballer who played with Melbourne in the Victorian Football League (VFL).
