= Jean-Paul Randriamanana =

Roman Catholic bishop

Jean-Paul Randriamanana (June 27, 1950 – November 9, 2011) was the Roman Catholic titular bishop of Paria in Proconsolare and auxiliary bishop of the Roman Catholic Archdiocese of Antananarivo, Madagascar.

Ordained in 1979, Randriamanana was named bishop in 1999, dying in office.
