= Dennis Alexander =

English footballer (1935–2011)

Personal information
- Full name: Dennis Leslie Alexander
- Date of birth: 19 February 1935
- Place of birth: Nottingham, England
- Date of death: 11 November 2011 (aged 76)
- Position: Inside forward

Youth career
- –1955: Nottingham Forest

Senior career*
Years	Team	Apps	(Gls)
1955–1957	Nottingham Forest	20	(4)
1958–1959	Brighton & Hove Albion	0	(0)
1958–1959	Gateshead	17	(1)
1959–1961	Ilkeston Town	84	(23)
1961–19??	Sutton Town		
- Long Eaton United
- Belper Town

Managerial career
- Long Eaton United (player-manager)
- * Club domestic league appearances and goals

Dennis Alexander (1935–2011) was an English footballer who played as an inside forward.

Alexander started his career at Nottingham Forest, progressing from the youth team before making his first team debut in 1955. Alexander scored four goals in 20 league appearances for Forest before a brief spell at Brighton & Hove Albion, in which he did not make an appearance. Alexander then signed for Gateshead in 1958, going on to score a single goal in 17 league appearances. Alexander went on to play non-league football with Ilkeston Town, Sutton Town, Long Eaton United (where he was player-manager) and Belper Town.

== Sources ==
- "Post War English & Scottish Football League A–Z Player's Transfer Database".
- "The Independent Ilkeston Football Website".
