= Charles Hoeflich =

American banker (1914–2011)

- Born: April 4, 1914
- Died: November 28, 2011 (aged 97)
- Education: University of Pennsylvania
- Known for: President of Univest Bank

Charles H. Hoeflich (April 4, 1914 – November 28, 2011) was the former Vice President of the Philadelphia National Bank, former president of Univest bank and a philanthropist.

== Life ==
He attended the University of Pennsylvania to study business, but only after accepting a scholarship to the Philadelphia College of Art. After graduating from Wharton, The University of Pennsylvania's school of business, Hoeflich dreamed of working at the Philadelphia National Bank. After he was hired, he spent the next twenty-five years working at the Philadelphia National Bank (PNB); Only taking an intermission during World War II to serve as a member of the Airtransport Command. Hoeflich became vice president of Philadelphia National Bank in 1951 and served this position until he left to become president of Souderton Bank in 1962.

Hoeflich along with Victor Milione, William F. Buckley Jr, were the founding members of Intercollegiate Studies Institute (ISI).

Hoeflich was a devout Roman Catholic, having converted to the faith in the 1960s from the Mennonite Church. He was an avid parishioner at St. John the Baptist Church in Ottsville, Pennsylvania. He was also a significant benefactor to the Fatima Retreat House located in Bedminster, Pennsylvania.

Mr. Hoeflich believed in growing and supporting local businesses such as the Crawford Broadcasting Company of Philadelphia, whose owner, Donald B. Crawford, came to the bank in a final attempt to secure a loan to save his radio stations. Crawford had been turned down by numerous financial institutions before coming to see Hoeflich, who agreed to loan him the money to stave off bankruptcy and save a local business.

Hoeflich's philanthropic endeavors were numerous. He was a founding director of the Human Rights Foundation, Intercollegiate Studies Institute, and Penn Foundation. According to these organizations, Hoeflich's continued support and counsel for these charities were essential to their growth and continuation. His passion for giving back to the community continues today with the entire proceeds from this estate sale benefitting Biblical Theological Seminary, Grand View Hospital, Intercollegiate Studies Institute, and Penn Foundation. He often read three books at a time of various genres and read the New York Times daily. He enjoyed collecting Americana antiques and art, paintings and horticulture.

Hoeflich's love of American history and Americana was evident in his collection of antiques. He was an avid collector of early American stoneware, baskets, redware, and furniture, especially unique and rare pieces from Colonial-era Pennsylvania. The two-day sale features nearly 1,000 items from the 18th-century farmhouse in Bedminster, Pennsylvania, known as "Elderberry Farm," that Hoeflich called home for half a century.

Alderfer Auction & Appraisal presented the auction of the Americana Collection from the estate of Charles H. Hoeflich on June 8–9, 2012.

=== Death ===
Charles Hoeflich died on November 28, 2011, at the age of ninety-seven.

== Career ==
While President of Souderton Bank, now known as Univest, Hoeflich enhanced the banks portfolio from $14 million in commercial loans and $2.2 million in trust assets into one that represented $2 billion in commercial paper and a $1 billion trust function. Even after retirement Hoeflich continued to serve on Soudertons board of trustees.

== Foundations and committees ==
- The Penn Foundation
- The Human Rights Foundation
- The Intercollegiate Studies Institute (ISI)(board member)
- The Lamb Foundation (board member)
- The Bedminster Zoning Board (chairman)
- The Bank Marketing Association (fmr. president)
- The Republican Presidential Task Force
- The Union League Club in Philadelphia
- The Heritage Foundation

== Awards ==
- Presidential citation (USAAF) 1946
- Citizen of the Year award (Federal Bar Association) 1960
- Lifetime Achievement award (the Intercollegiate Studies Institute) 2000
