= Carl Nyrén =

Swedish architect

Carl Nyrén (11 November 1917 – 6 November 2011) was a Swedish architect.

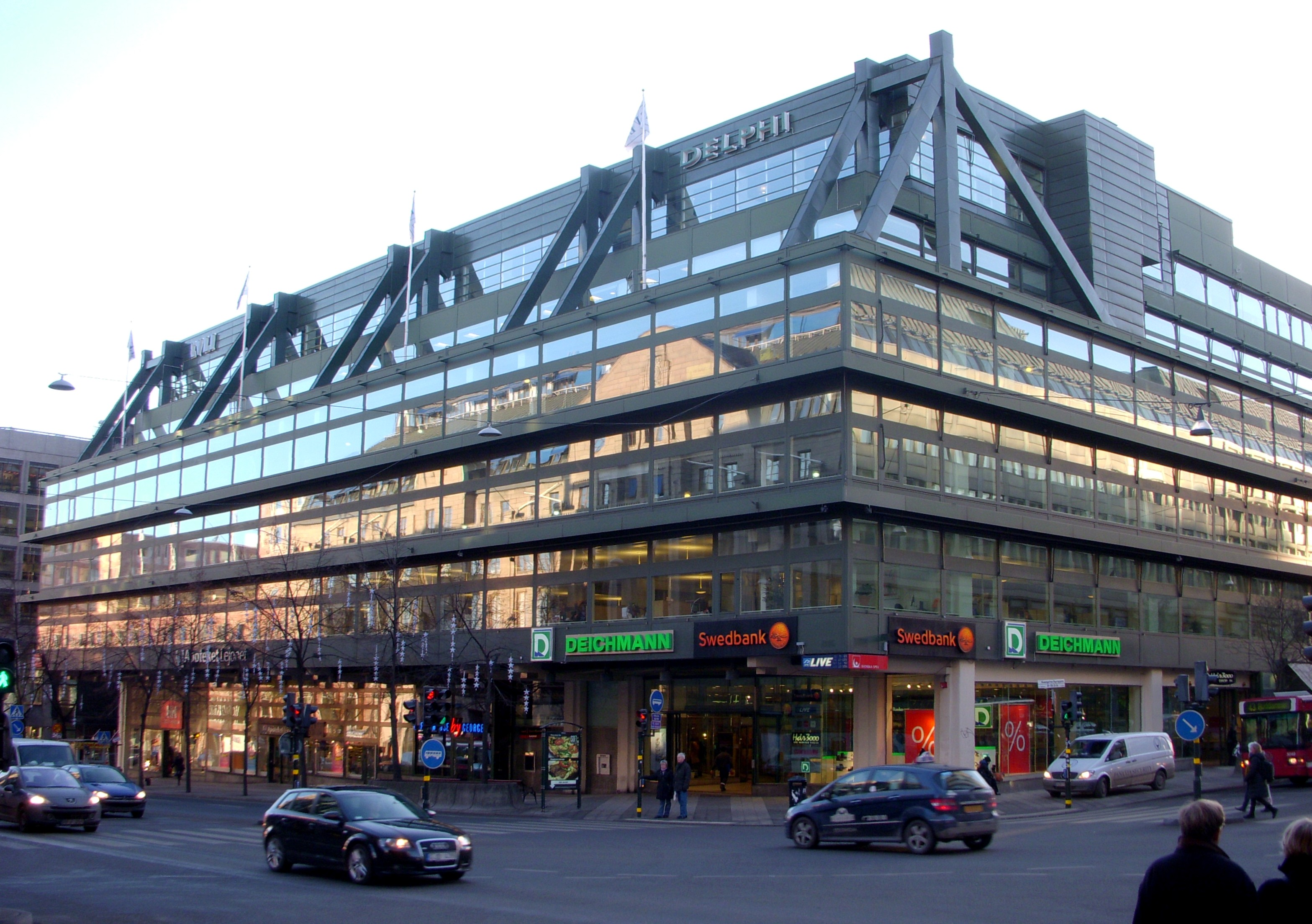
Sparbankshuset Stockholm

== Biography ==
Nyrén was born in Jönköping, Sweden. Nyrén was the son of Johan Albert and Gertrud Nyrén and grew up in Hovslätt as the youngest of six children. He graduated from the KTH Royal Institute of Technology in Stockholm during 1942. He was first employed by modernist architect Paul Hedqvist. Nyrén was initially influenced by the modernism of Gunnar Asplund (1885–1940). Later in the 1960s, developed towards structuralistic architecture.

During the last two decades of his career, his buildings have were characterized by a romantic, humanistic style.

His office, Nyréns Arkitektkontor AB was founded in 1948. The firm employs architects, interior designers and construction engineers. It remains one of Sweden's leading architectural firms.

Carl Nyrén died on November 6, 2011, five days before what would have been his 94th birthday.

== Buildings ==
- School of Economics at University of Gothenburg, 1952
- Faculty of Education, Malmö University, 1963 and 1973
- Arrhenius Laboratory at Stockholm University, 1973
- Sparbankshuset, Stockholm, 1973-1975
- Gottsunda Church, Uppsala, 1980
- Uppsala City Library, 1986
- Extension of the Jönköping County Museum, 1991
- "Artisten", education facility for music and theater, University of Gothenburg, 1992
- Vitlycke Museum, Tanum, 1999
- Gamla Uppsala museum, Uppsala, 2000
- Komedianten, Varberg, 2012
