= Seppo Sanaksenaho =

Finnish politician (1938–2011)

Seppo Sanaksenaho (5 May 1938 – 1 November 2011) was a Finnish politician who served as the mayor of Vaasa from 1997 to 2001.

Sanaksenaho was born in Oulu, Finland, in 1938. He earned an engineering degree from the Helsinki University of Technology, which now forms part of Aalto University. Sanaksenaho received a master's degree in engineering from Pennsylvania State University in the United States.

Sanaksenaho worked as an engineer for the cities of Porvoo and Helsinki during his early career. He served as the deputy mayor of Vaasa from 1979 to 1996, before becoming the city's Mayor in 1997.

Seppo Sanaksenaho died on 1 November 2011, at the age 73.
