= Sydney Andrew =

English industrial chemical engineer

- Sydney Percy Smith Andrew 1976, from The Royal Society

Sydney Percy Smith Andrew FRS (1926–2011) was an English industrial chemical engineer. His whole career was with Imperial Chemical Industries (ICI), subsequently ICI Agricultural Division, at Billingham, County Durham, England.
