= Georgi Movsesyan =

Russian composer

Georgi Viktorovich Movsesyan (Russian: Гео́ргий Ви́кторович Мовсеся́н; 2 August 1945 – 7 November 2011) was a Russian composer of Armenian descent.

== Biography ==
Movsesyan was born in Kharkov, Ukraine, into a family of artists. He graduated from the Gnessin State Musical College in 1964.

Movsesyan is Merited Artist of the Russian Federation (1995) and People's Artist of Russia (2001).

The first song, "Roads", was written in 1965. In 1969, he was an actor of the Mosconcert association, soloist and concertmaster of the music studio.

He is mostly known for his songs "Beryoza", "Moi goda", "Olympiada", "Nachalo" performed by Iosif Kobzon, Lev Leshchenko, Anna German, Vakhtang Kikabidze and others.

He died at the age of 67 on November 7, 2011 in Moscow, as a result of a heart attack.
