= Guo Tao (general) =

Chinese general (1926–2011)

Guo Tao (Chinese: 郭涛; pinyin: Guō Tāo; February 1926 − 3 November 2011) was a lieutenant general (zhong jiang) of the People's Liberation Army of China. He served as deputy commander of the Nanjing Military Region.

Guo was born in February 1926 in Wei County, Hebei, China. He joined the army in July 1941, and the Chinese Communist Party in November 1945. He fought in many wars and battles including the Huaihai Campaign, the Korean War, and the Vietnam War. He attained the rank of lieutenant general in 1988, and served as deputy commander of the Nanjing Military Region for seven years. Guo died in Nanjing, Jiangsu, China on 3 November 2011, at the age of 85.
