= Franco Chillemi =

Italian voice actor (1942–2011)

- Born: 19 July 1942; Catania, Italy
- Died: 5 November 2011 (aged 69); Rome, Italy
- Occupations: Actor; voice actor; dialogue writer
- Years active: 1970–2011
- Mother: Grazia Di Marzà

Franco Chillemi (19 July 1942 – 5 November 2011) was an Italian actor and voice actor.

== Biography ==
Born in Catania, Chillemi began his career in the early 1970s making appearances in at least three films, but he was more popular to the Italian public as a voice dubber. He was best known for dubbing characters for Italian dubbed Disney films, most notably Governor Ratcliffe in Pocahontas and the 1998 sequel as well as the Archdeacon in The Hunchback of Notre Dame.

In Chillemi's live action roles, he dubbed Oliver Ford Davies, Vittorio Duse, Robert Loggia and James Earl Jones in at least one their movies.

=== Personal life ===
Chillemi was the son of film actress Grazia Di Marzà.

== Death ==
Chillemi died in Rome on 5 November 2011 at the age of 69.

== Filmography ==
- Hell in the Aegean (Sti mahi tis Kritis, 1970)
- Hours of Terror (Ore di terrore, 1971)
- Testa in giù, gambe in aria (1972)

== Dubbing roles ==
=== Animation ===
- Governor Ratcliffe in Pocahontas, Pocahontas II: Journey to a New World
- Archdeacon in The Hunchback of Notre Dame
- Don Ira Feinberg in Shark Tale
- Cassim in Aladdin and the King of Thieves
- Ranjan's father in The Jungle Book 2
- "Vlad" in Anastasia
- Tony in Lady and the Tramp (1997 redub)
- Forte in Beauty and the Beast: The Enchanted Christmas

=== Live action ===
- Sio Bibble in Star Wars: Episode I – The Phantom Menace
- Don Tommasino in The Godfather Part III
- Jim Kalla in The Second Civil War
- Father Monet in Joan of Arc
- Arresting Officer in 101 Dalmatians
- Master at Arms in Titanic
- Frenchy in Goodfellas
- Frank Costello in Bugsy
- Dog Kelly in The Quick and the Dead
