= Diocese of Kon Tum =

Roman Catholic diocese in Vietnam

Coordinates: 14.3453°N 108.0132°E

Diocese of Kon Tum Dioecesis Kontumensis Giáo phận Kontum

Catholic
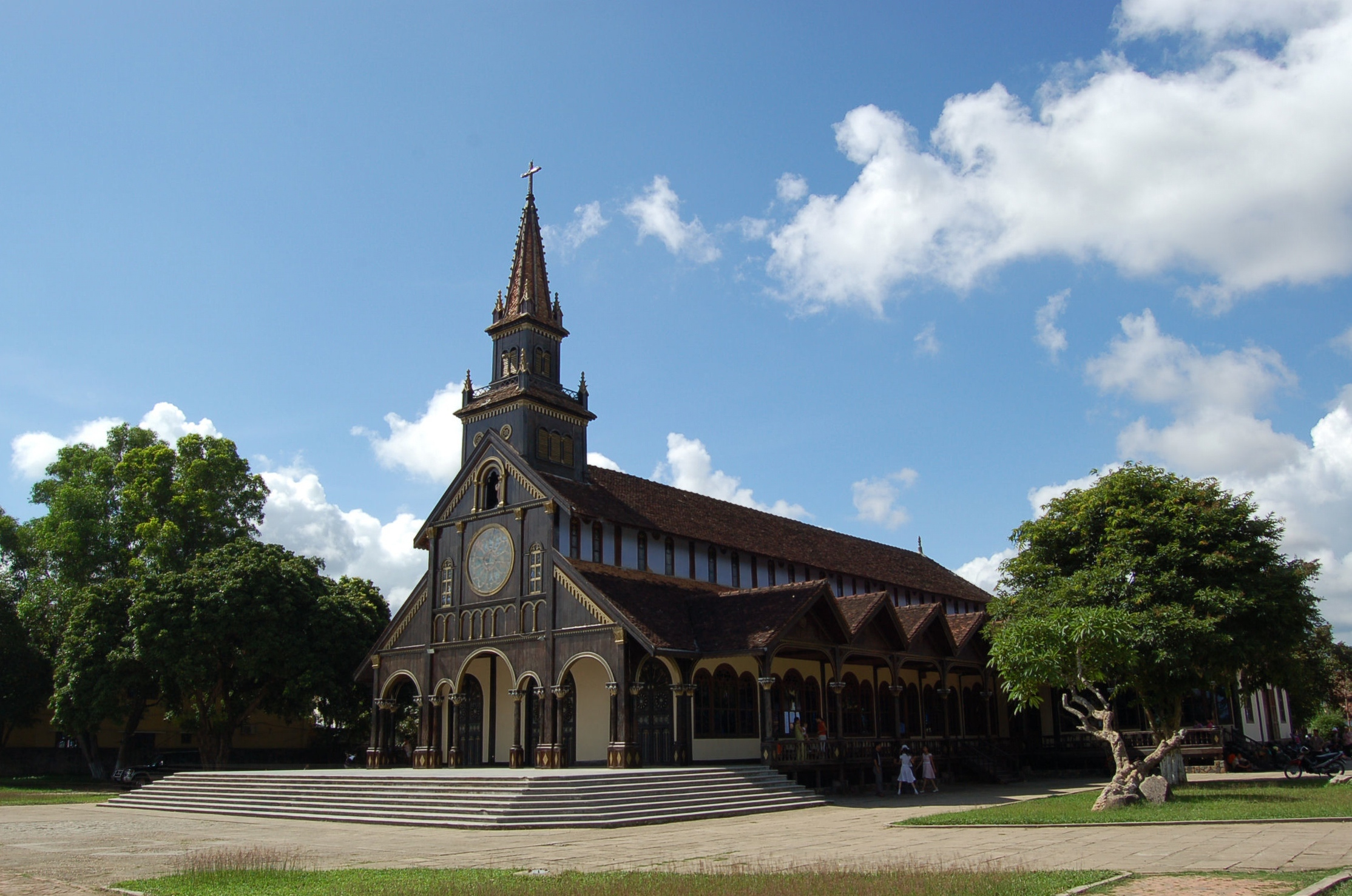
- Kontum Cathedral

Location
- Country: Vietnam
- Ecclesiastical province: Huế
- Metropolitan: Huế

Statistics
- Area: 25,187 km^{2} (9,725 sq mi)
- Population: Total; Catholics: (as of 2022); 2,138,500; 394,274 (18.4%)
- Parishes: 143

Information
- Denomination: Catholic
- Sui iuris church: Latin Church
- Rite: Roman Rite
- Established: January 18, 1932 (as Vicariate Apostolic of Kontum); November 24, 1960 (as Diocese of Kontum)
- Cathedral: Cathedral of the Immaculate Conception in Kon Tum
- Patron saint: Saint Étienne-Théodore Cuenot
- Secular priests: 103

Current leadership
- Pope: Leo XIV
- Bishop: Aloysius Gonzaga Nguyễn Hùng Vị
- Metropolitan Archbishop: Joseph Ðặng Ðức Ngân
- Bishops emeritus: Michael Hoàng Đức Oanh

Website
- giaophankontum.com

Diocese of Kon Tum (Latin: Dioecesis Kontumensis) is a Roman Catholic diocese of Vietnam around the city of Kon Tum. The bishop since 2015 is Aloysius Gonzaga Nguyễn Hùng Vị. More than 16% of the million persons living in its area are Roman Catholics. Many of them belong to ethnic minorities.

The diocese covers an area of 25,728 km^{2} of central Vietnam. It is a suffragan diocese of the Archdiocese of Huế. It was erected as a Vicariate Apostolic on January 18, 1932. On November 24, 1960, it was elevated to a diocese. In 1967, some of the territory was split off to form the new Diocese of Ban Mê Thuột.

== Ordinaries ==
=== Vicar Apostolic of Kontum (1933-1960) ===
Vicar Apostolic		Period in office	Status	Reference
1	Bishop Martial-Pierre-Marie Jannin, M.E.P.	January 10, 1933 – July 16, 1940	Died in office	
2	Bishop Jean-Liévin-Joseph Sion, M.E.P.	December 23, 1941 – August 19, 1951	Died in office	
3	Bishop Paul-Léon Seitz, M.E.P.	June 19, 1952 – November 24, 1960	Remains as Bishop of Kontum.	

=== Bishop of Kontum (1960-present) ===
Bishop		Coat of Arms	Period in office	Status	Reference
1	Bishop Paul-Léon Seitz, M.E.P.		November 24, 1960 – October 02, 1975	Resigned	
2	Bishop Alexis Phạm Văn Lộc		October 02, 1975 – April 08, 1995	Resigned	
3	Bishop Pierre Trần Thanh Chung		April 08, 1995 – July 16, 2003	Resigned	
4	Bishop Michel Hoàng Ðức Oanh		July 16, 2003 – October 07, 2015	Resigned	
5	Bishop Luy Gonzaga Nguyễn Hùng Vị		October 07, 2015 – present	Current Bishop	

Coadjutor Bishops of Kontum (1975-1995)

Coadjutor Bishop		Period in office	Reference
1	Bishop Alexis Phạm Văn Lộc	March 27, 1975 – October 02, 1975	
2	Bishop Pierre Trần Thanh Chung	March 26, 1981 – April 08, 1995	
