= Södermanland runic inscription 140 =

Viking Age runic inscription in Sweden

Coordinates: 58°55′25.0″N 17°03′15.1″E

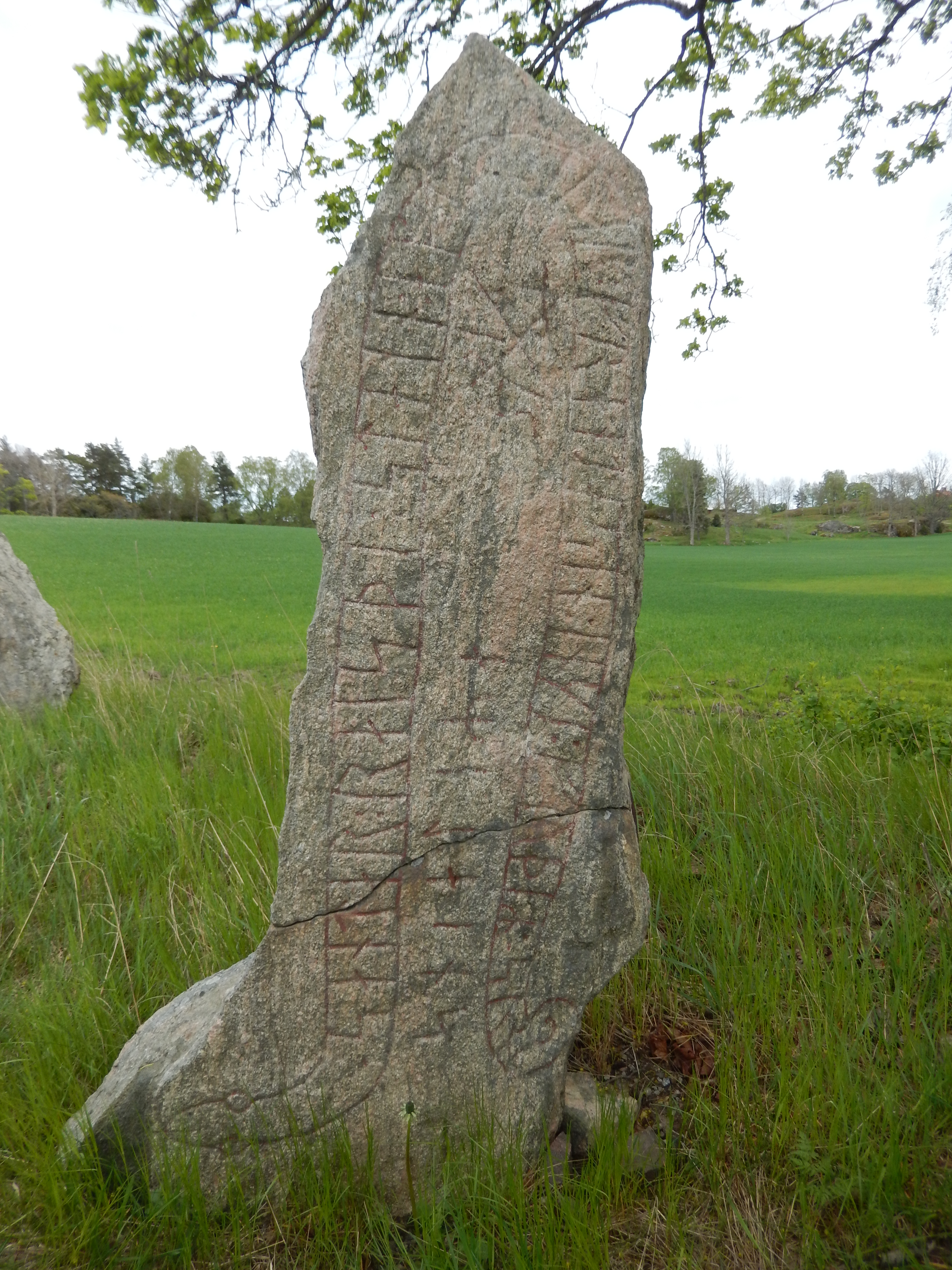
Sö 140

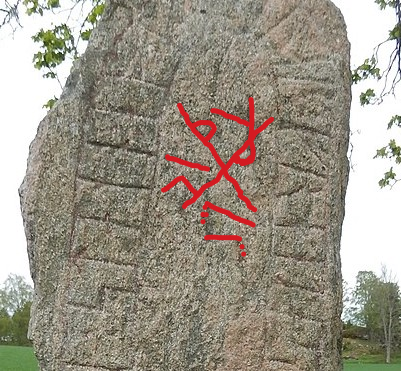
The runic cross, based on Bianchi 2010, p. 125

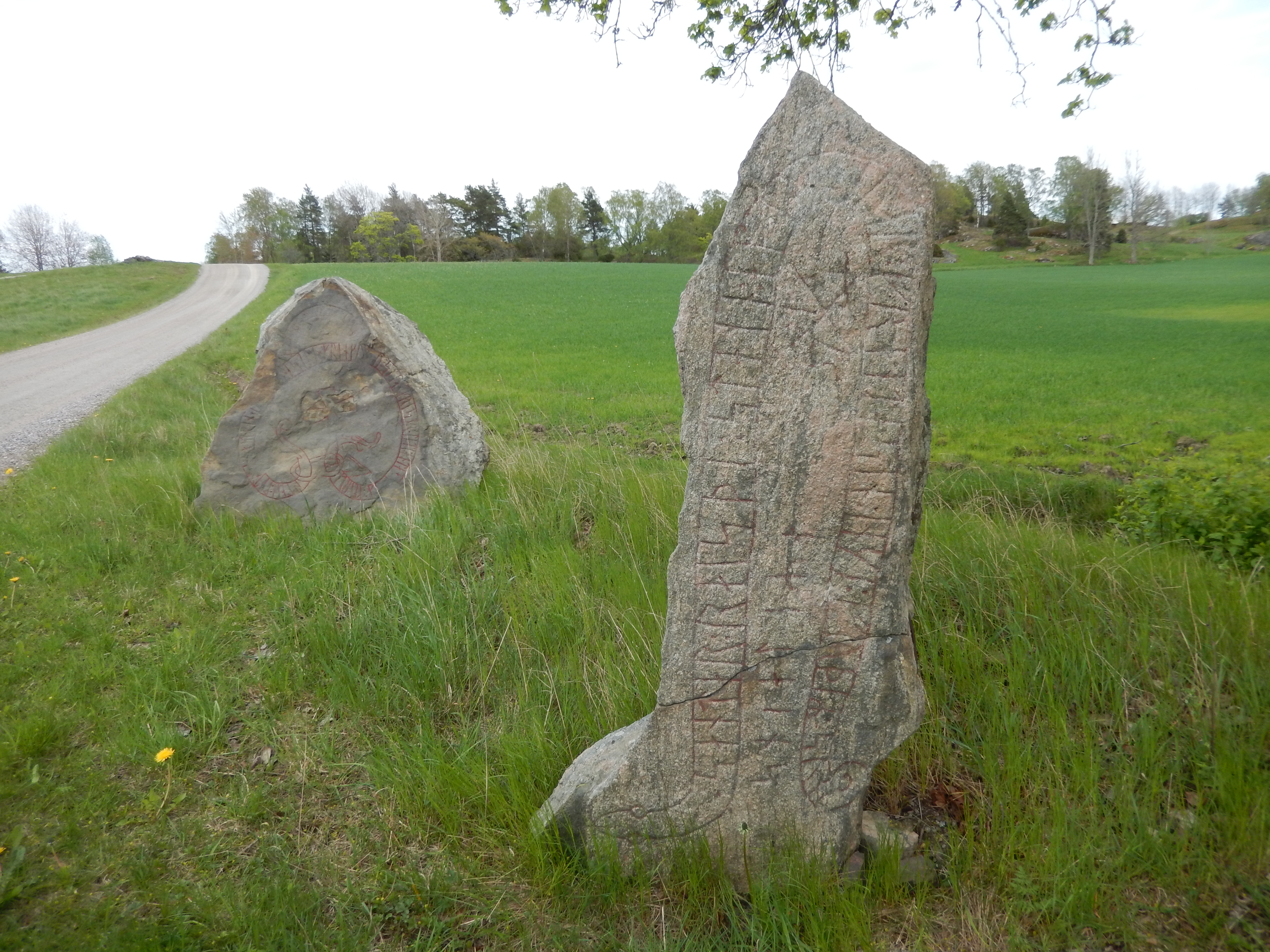
Sö 139 and Sö 140

Södermanland runic inscription 140 (Sö 140) is a Viking Age runestone inscribed in Old Norse with the Younger Futhark runic alphabet. It and Sö 139 stand close together on the south side of the road next to the brook at Korpbro, between Lid and Aspa in Ludgo parish, Nyköping Municipality, in Södermanland, but Sö 140 was found broken and has been re-erected. A cross in the centre of the stone formed by five bind runes has been variously interpreted as an invocation of Thor or as part of the inscription.

== Description ==
The stone was discovered in 1899 in a field south of Sö 139; it was broken in two pieces. In 1903, it had been repaired with three iron cramps on either side and was erected some 40 paces south of the other runestone, but nowadays, it stands 3.5 m WSW of the other stone. The stone is 2.03 m tall, of which 1.67 m are above ground, and it is 75 cm wide. The style of the runestone is a categorized as Fp. The runic inscription is well preserved and has no damaged runes. The inscription ends in the centre of the stone, where there are five bind runes in the form of a cross, as well as three loosely placed ones. The message of the runic cross is contested.

== Bind runes ==
Erik Brate noted that the runestone lacks a Christian cross and read the last runes as siþi þur, which he interpreted as Siði Þorr, "Thor, make it right" meaning "May Thor safeguard". The verb has also been taken as a reference to seiðr, that is, "May Thor work magic", with the same intention. Brate interpreted the runic cross as a pagan statement against the newly arrived Christian faith, and this has led to the stone becoming one of the most commonly cited runic inscriptions in popular science publications. The inscription has been discussed by scholars such as Henrik Williams (1996) and Anders Hultgård (1992, 1998), but in spite of the fact that Elias Wessén (1935) considered it untenable, the interpretation was not seriously challenged until 2010. A more recent interpretation reads the runes as "in Sweden" instead.

According to Bianchi's new interpretation (2010), the runic cross should be read i siþiuþu, which would allow a coherent reading of the inscription as Ængi føðiʀ sun sniallara í Svéþiúðu, meaning "No-one will bear a more able son in Sweden". This means that the runic inscription contains a similar message to the nearby Sö Fv1948;289, which says Urðu da[uði]ʀ [í] Dan[mar]ku, vá[ʀ]u ríkiʀ á Rauningi ok sniallastiʀ í Svéþiúðu meaning "(They) died in Denmark, were powerful in Rauningi and the ablest in Sweden."

The lack of a u rune (the semi-vowel w) between the s and the i is not unique but is found on several other runestones, such as DR 370 (sartr for Svartr), G 134 (where the verb svikva is spelled siku, suiki and suiu) and U 954 (where the same verb is written seik. Moreover, there are a few later occurrences of Svéþiúð in Old Swedish where the semi-vowel is missing.

The new reading of Sö 140 has been accepted as a more secure reading than Brate's by the Scandinavian Runic-text Data Base published by Uppsala University.

== Inscription ==
There is a long-standing practice of writing transliterations of the runes in Latin characters in boldface and transcribing the text into a normalized form of the language with italic type. This practice exists because the two forms of rendering a runic text have to be kept distinct. By not only showing the original inscription but also transliterating, transcribing and translating, scholars present the analysis in a way that allows the reader to follow their interpretation of the runes. Every step presents challenges, but most Younger Futhark inscriptions are considered easy to interpret.

In transliterations, : and · represent common word dividers, while ¶ represents that the inscriptions continues in a different place on the stone. §P and §Q introduce two alternative readings of an inscription that concern multiple words.

Other special signs are þ and ð, where the first one is the thorn letter which represents a voiceless dental fricative as th in English thing. The second letter is eth which stands for a voiced dental fricative as th in English them. The ʀ sign represents the yr rune.

: santar : raisþi : stain : eftiʀ : iuar : franta sin : inki : fuþiʀ : sun · snialiʀa ¶ siþi þur
{} Sandarr {} ræisþi {} stæin {} æftiʀ {} Ioar/Ivar, {} frænda sinn. {} Ængi {} føðiʀ {} sun {} sniallara. {} Siði(?) Þorr(?).
Sandarr raised the stone in memory of Jóarr/Ívarr, his kinsman. No-one will bear a more able son. May Þórr(?) safeguard(?)

: santar : raisþi : stain : eftiʀ : iuar : franta sin : inki : fuþiʀ : sun · snialiʀa ¶ i siþiuþu
{} Sandarr {} ræisþi {} stæin {} æftiʀ {} Ioar/Ivar, {} frænda sinn. {} Ængi {} føðiʀ {} sun {} sniallara {} i Sveþiuðu.
Sandarr raised the stone in memory of Jóarr/Ívarr, his kinsman. No-one will bear a more able son in Sweden.

== Sources ==
- Antonsen, Elmer H. (2002). Runes and Germanic Linguistics. Mouton de Gruyter. ISBN 3-11-017462-6.
- Scandinavian Runic-text Database, Sö 140
- Marco Bianchi. RUNOR SOM RESURS//Vikingatida skriftkultur i Uppland och Södermanland, 2010
- McKinnell, John; Simek, Rudolf; Düwel, Klaus (2004). "Gods and Mythological Beings in the Younger Futhark". Runes, Magic and Religion: A Sourcebook (PDF). Vienna: Fassbaender. pp. 116–33. ISBN 3900538816.
- Elias Wessén, Erik Brate. Sveriges runinskrifter. Vol. 3, Södermanlands runinskrifter. 1924–1936. Stockholm: Kungliga Vitterhets Historie och Antikvitets Akademien. p. 106.
