= Södermanland runic inscription 139 =

Viking Age runestone

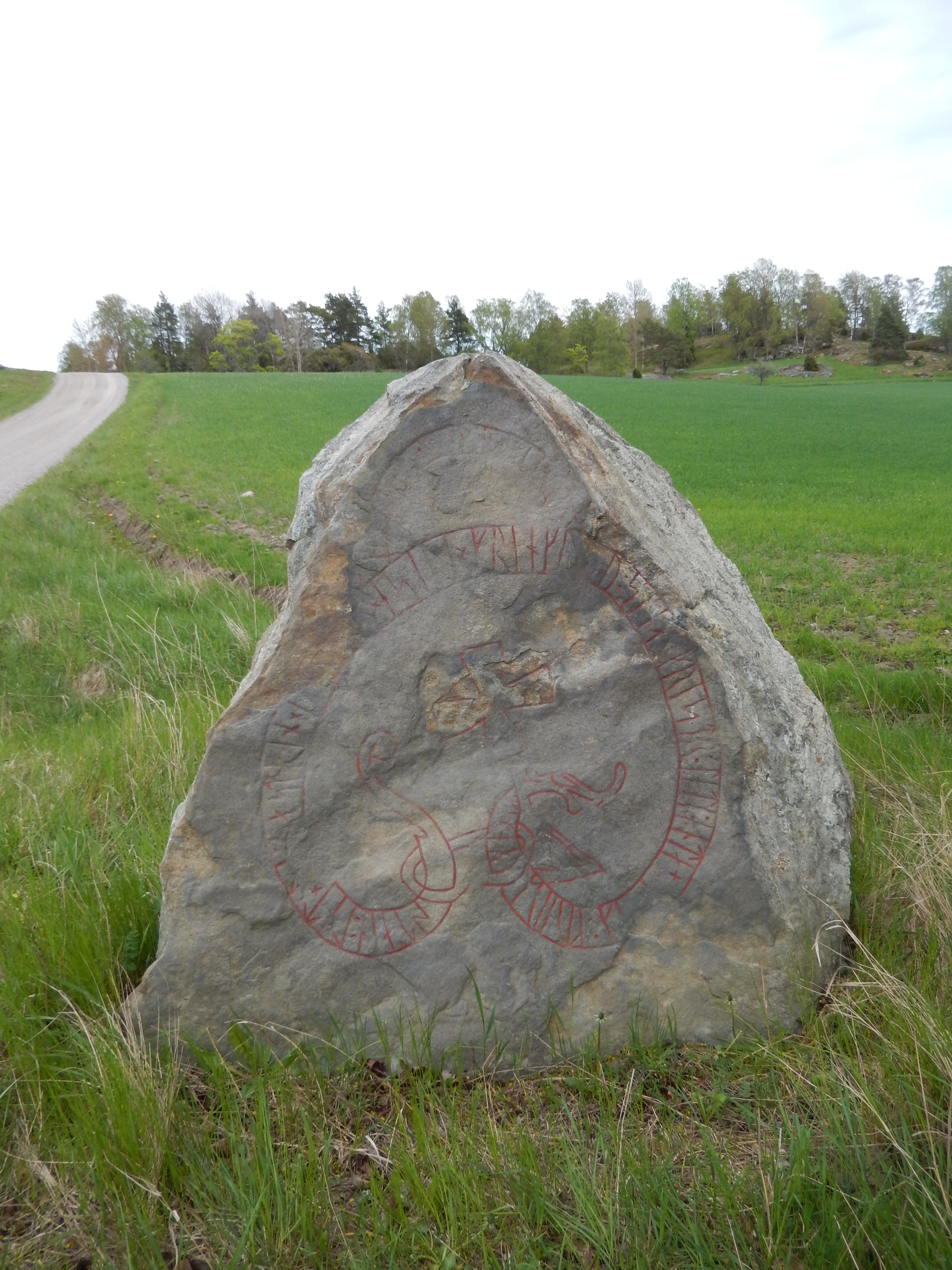
Sö 139

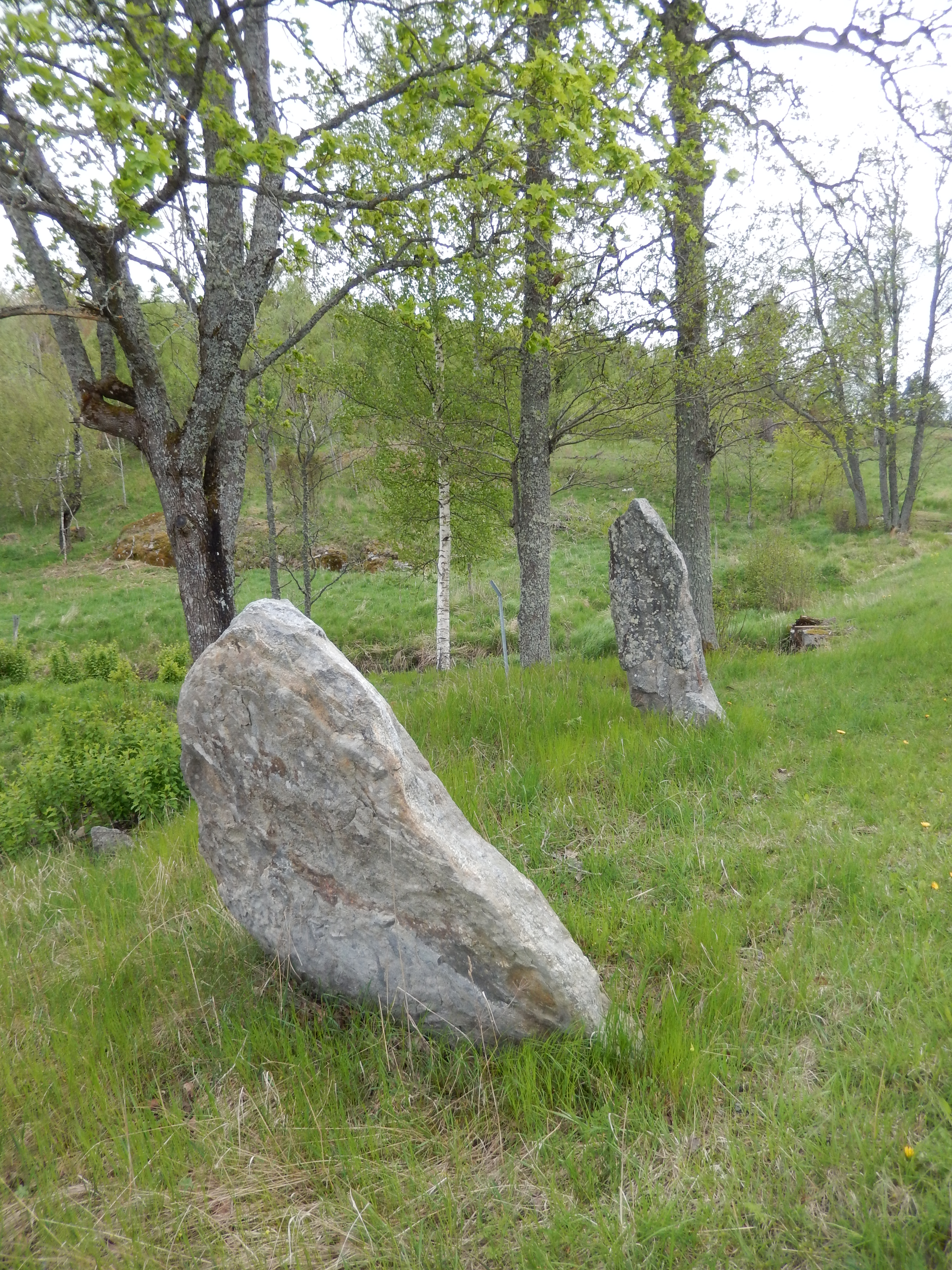
Sö 139 next to Sö 140

Sö 139 is a Viking Age runestone in granite inscribed in Old Norse with the Younger Futhark runic alphabet. It is located 3.5 m east-north-east of Sö 140 along the road between Lid and Aspa in Ludgo parish, in Nyköping Municipality, in Södermanland. Both stones are placed at the southern side of the road next to the brook at Korpbro. It is 1.48 m tall and 1.36 m wide. The style is tentatively categorized as Pr3. It is unusual because it was raised in memory of a woman.

== Inscription ==
stain : lit × raisa stain × þ... ... × esiþi × frinkunu × sina × kristr : liti : anta + ...(a)ʀ : kunuʀ koþraʀ k-...-...-- · [a](u)k : fiþr [·] þiʀ + ristu × ru
Stæinn {} let {} ræisa stæin {} þ[annsi at](?) {} Æshæiði, {} frændkunu {} sina. {} Kristr {} letti {} anda {} [henn]aʀ(?), {} kunuʀ goðraʀ. ... {} ok {} Fiðr {} þæiʀ {} ristu {} runaʀ.
"Steinn had this stone raised in memory of(?) Ásheiðr, his kinswoman. May Christ relieve her spirit, the good wife. ... and Finnr, they carved the runes."

== Sources ==
"Sö 139". Scandinavian Runic-text Database (2020 ed.). Department of Scandinavian Languages, Uppsala University. 2020-12-03.

- Elias Wessén, Erik Brate. Sveriges runinskrifter. Bd 3, Södermanlands runinskrifter. 1924–1936. Kungliga Vitterhets Historie och Antikvitets Akademien. Stockholm.
