= Runestones at Aspa =

Set of historic runestones in Sweden

Coordinates: 58.9266°N 17.09916°E

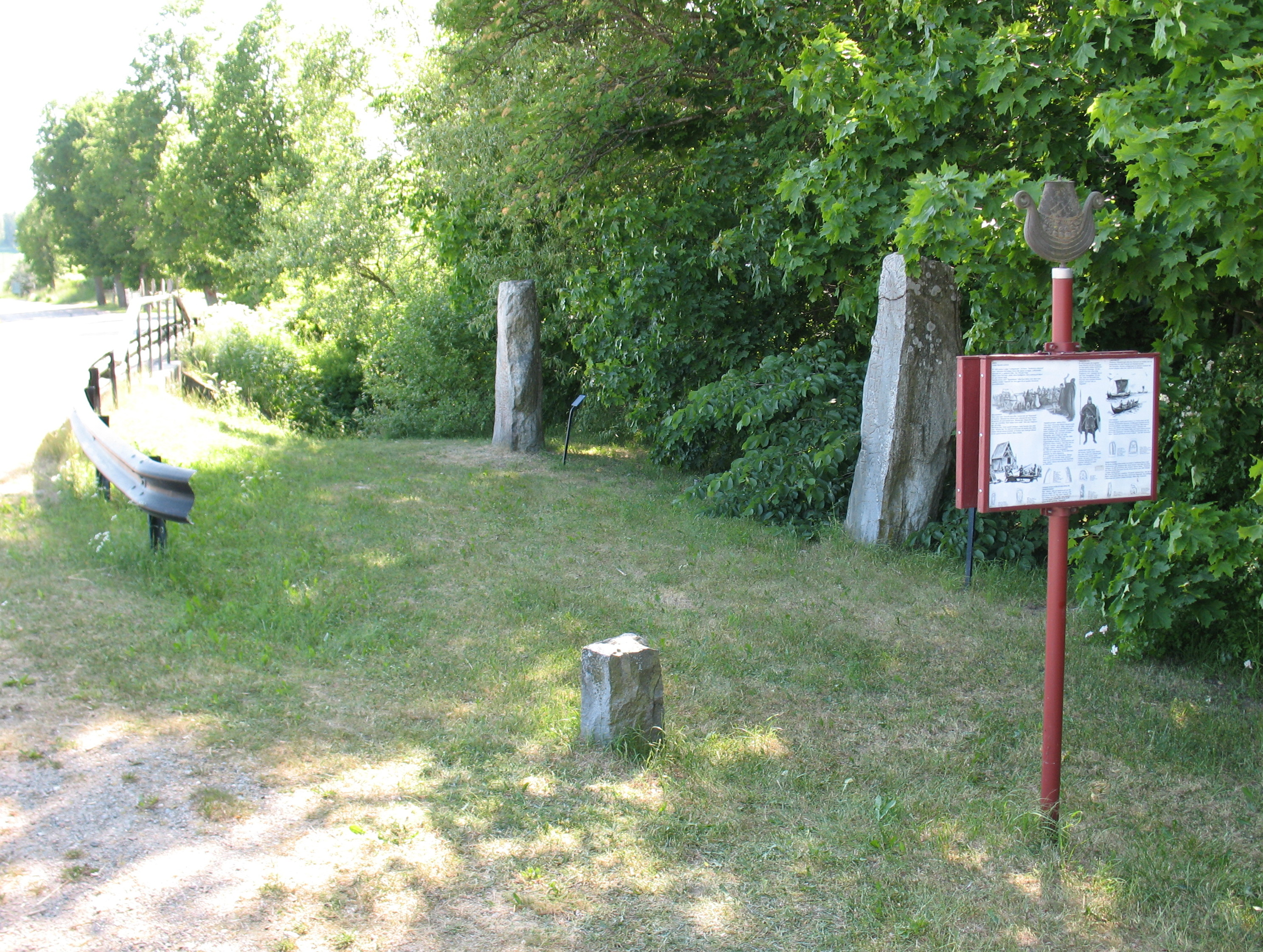
Sö Fv1948;289 and Sö 141 at Aspa bridge

The Runestones at Aspa are a set of four runestones located at Aspa, about six kilometers north of Runtuna, Södermanland, Sweden, where a road has passed a creek since prehistoric times. One of the stones, Sö Fv1948;289, is the oldest surviving native Scandinavian source that mentions the Kingdom of Sweden beside the runestones DR 344 and DR 216. Another stone, Sö 137, was apparently raised in memory of a Viking who had spent time in the west.

== Tingshögen and Eriksgata ==
Aspa was the location of the local assembly called the Tingshögen for the Rönö Hundred administrative area until 1600, and the newly elected king passed the stones during his Eriksgata. The Eriksgata was the traditional journey of the newly elected medieval Swedish kings through the important provinces to have their election confirmed by the local assemblies. The actual election took place at the Stone of Mora in Uppland. Runestones at other locations that tradition holds were associated with the Eriksgata include U 793 at Ulunda and Vg 4 at Stora Ek. Originally there were several runestones and standing stones erected at the Tingshögen, but today only a few remain, and some of these were recovered from having been reused as construction materials at a bridge.

== Sö Fv1948;289 ==
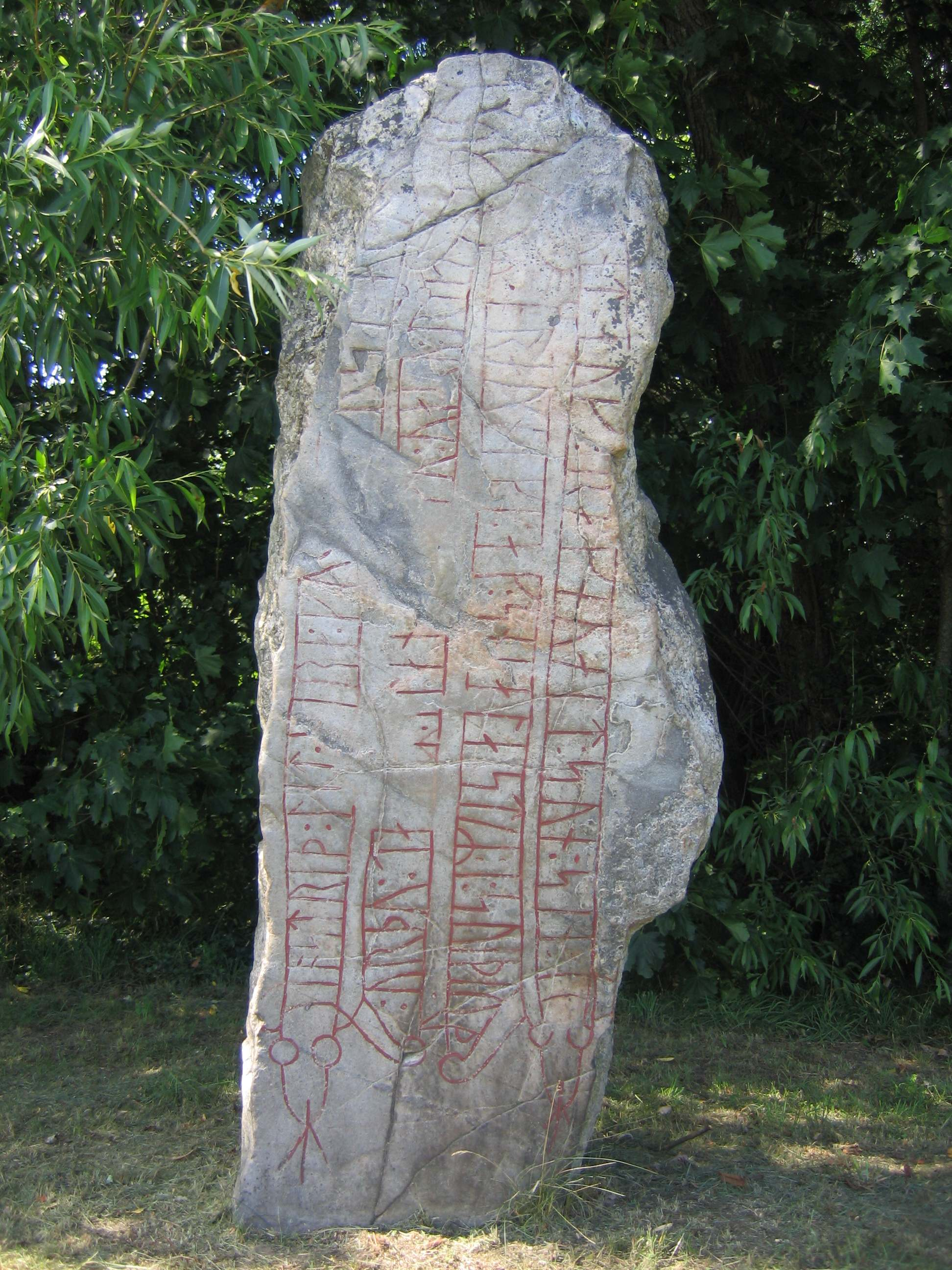
The runestone Sö Fv1948;289.

The inscription on this stone consists of tightly bound columns of text within bands that end in snake heads, and may be indicative of the influence of earlier Danish inscriptions on decorated runestones in Sweden. This granite runestone, which is 2.07 meters in height, is classified as being carved in runestone style Fp, which is the classification for inscriptions with bands that end in animal heads. It was raised in memory of a two men who died in Denmark. The runic text says that they were the ablest men in Sweden. The runestone was found in 1937 during trench work near a bridge and was moved adjacent to Sö 141. Originally, the stone was probably located at the Tingshögen, and later reused at the bridge. The Södermanland runic inscription 140 ends with a similar message.

The Rundata designation for this Södermanland inscription, Sö Fv1948;289, refers to the year and page number of the issue of Fornvännen in which the runestone was first described.

=== Inscription ===
==== Latin transliteration ====
ostriþ : lit : -ira : ku(m)... ...usi ÷ at : anunt ÷ auk : raknualt : sun : sin ÷: urþu : ta...ʀ : - (t)an...-...(k)u : ua-u : rikiʀ : o rauniki : ak : snialastiʀ : i : suiþiuþu

==== Old Norse transcription ====
Astrið let [g]æra kum[bl þa]usi at Anund ok Ragnvald, sun sinn. Urðu da[uði]ʀ [i] Dan[mar]ku, va[ʀ]u rikiʀ a Rauningi ok sniallastiʀ i Sveþiuðu.

==== English translation ====
Astrid had this memorial made after Anund and Ragnvald, her son. (They) died in Denmark, were powerful in Rauningi and the ablest in Sweden.

== Sö 136 ==
Runestone Sö 136 was documented during the surveys of runestones conducted in the late 17th century, but has since been lost. The inscription, however, is known from records. It is classified as having been carved in runestone style Pr1.

=== Inscription ===
==== Latin transliteration ====
[: suain : iuk : sluia * þaiʀ : raisþu : ---... ... ...-nu * at : faþur : sin : hirsi * uksniauin ian uas : unt hifni bistr]

==== Old Norse transcription ====
Svæinn ok Sloði(?) þæiʀ ræisþu ... ... ... at faður sinn, hærsi(?) hugsniallan(?). Hann vas und hifni bæztr.

==== English translation ====
Sveinn and Slóði(?), they raised ... ... ... in memory of their father, an able-minded(?) chieftain(?) He was the best under heaven.

== Sö 137 ==
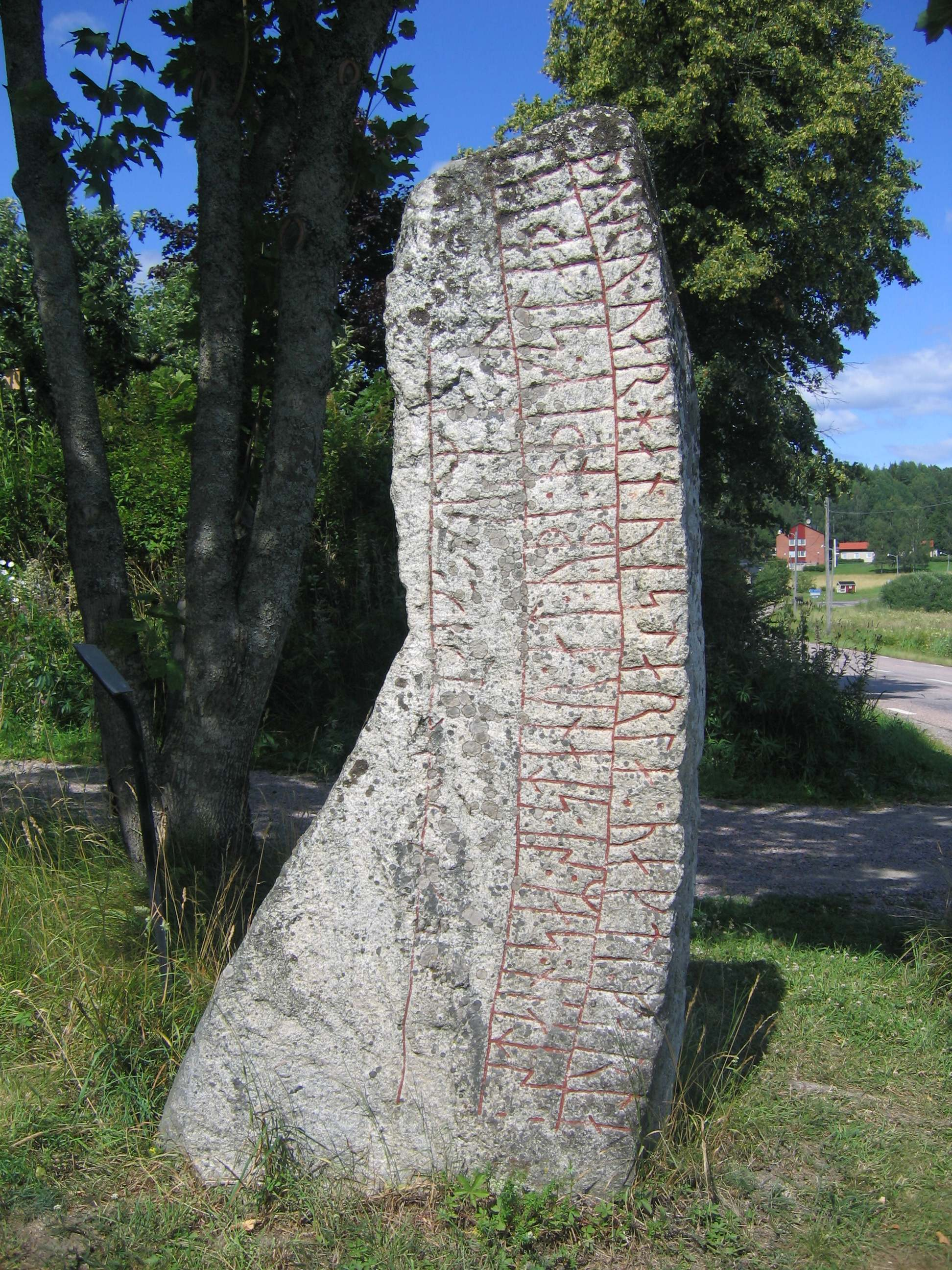
Side B of Sö 137.

This granite runestone, which is 2 meters in height, is classified as being carved in runestone style RAK, which is the classification for inscriptions with bands that are straight and do not end in animal heads. It was engraved with both long-branch runes and staveless runes. In the last row all the words but the last one were written with staveless runes. Sö 137 is also considered to be one of the Viking runestones. The runic inscription emphasizes that the stone was originally located at the Tingshögen.

=== Inscription ===
==== Latin transliteration ====
A þura : raisþi : stin : þ--si at : ubi : buanti : sin
B : stain : saʀ:si : stanr : at : ybi : o þik*staþi : at ¶ : þuru : uar : han : uestarla : uakti : karla ¶ [sa þar] * sunr þaþ * raknasuatau(k)i(f)maʀ[sua]

==== Old Norse transcription ====
A Þora ræisþi stæin þ[ann]si at Øpi, boanda sinn.
B Stæinn saʀsi standr at Øpi a þingstaði at Þoru ver. Hann vestarla væknti(?) karla, sa þaʀ sunʀ það. ...

==== English translation ====
A Þóra raised this stone in memory of Œpir, her husbandman.
B This stone stands in memory of Œpir, on the Assembly-place in memory of Þóra's husband. He armed(?) (his) men in the west. The son saw this there ...

== Sö 138 ==
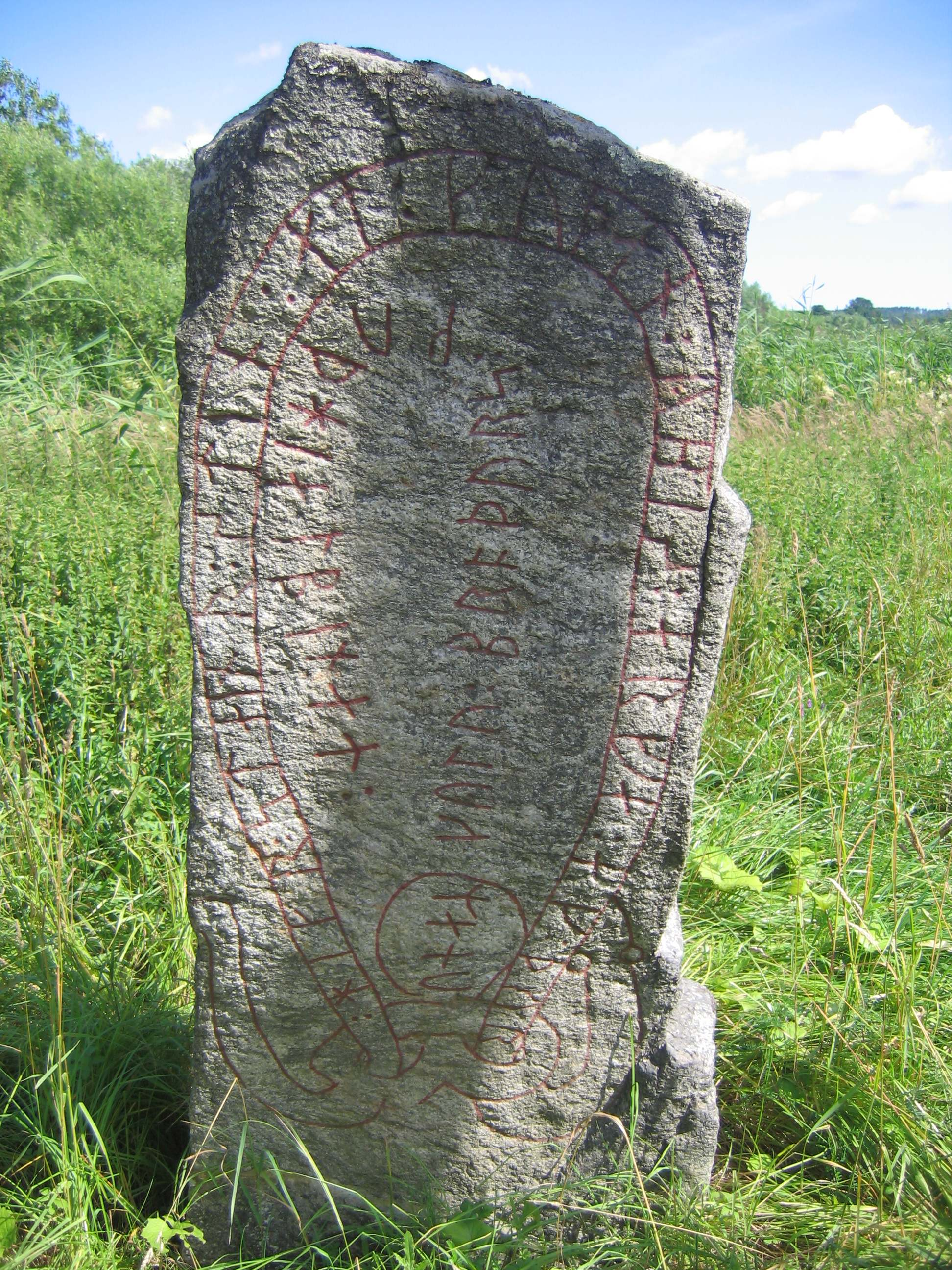
Sö 138.

This granite runestone, which is 2.1 meters in height, is classified as being carved in runestone style Fp. Similar to Sö 138, it has runic text written in the present tense, and was probably originally located at the Tingshögen.

=== Inscription ===
==== Latin transliteration ====
: hiar : stainr : stin : at : kuþan : ybis : arfa : ak : þurunaʀ kylu : broþurs : kuþ hialbin : at :

==== Old Norse transcription ====
Hier stændr stæinn at goðan Øpis arfa ok Þorunnaʀ, Gyllu broðurs. Guð hialpin and.

==== English translation ====
Here stands the stone in memory of Œpir's and Þórunnr's good heir, Gylla's brother. May God help (his) spirit.

== Sö 141 ==
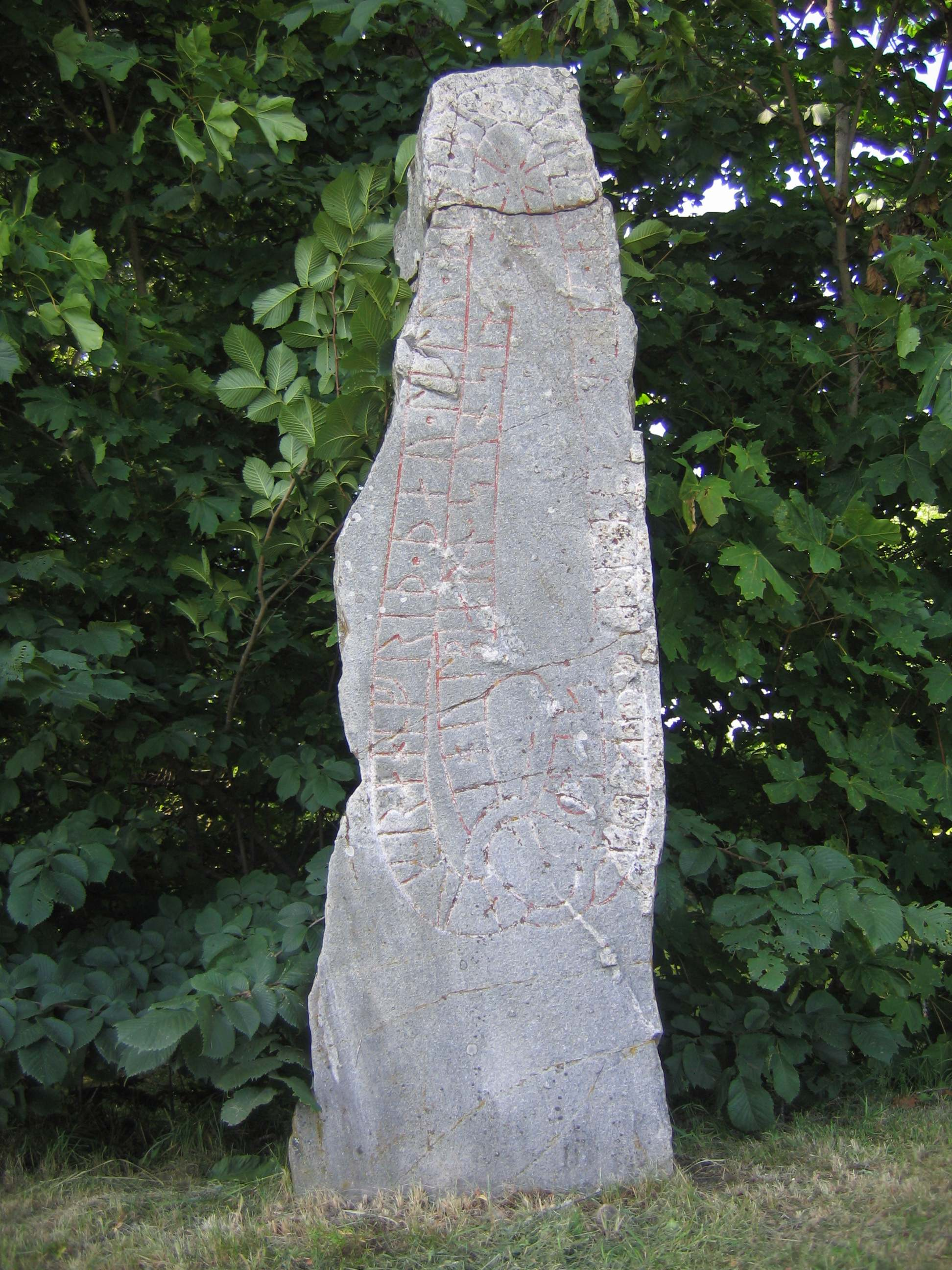
Sö 141.

This granite runestone was raised by two parents in memory of their son and has a Christian cross near the top of the inscription. The reference to bridge-building in the runic text is fairly common in runestones during this time period. Some are Christian references related to the soul passing the bridge into the afterlife. At this time, the Catholic Church sponsored the building of roads and bridges through the use of indulgences in return for the church's intercession for the soul of the departed. There are many examples of these bridge stones dated from the 11th century, including runic inscriptions Sö 101, U 489, and U 617.

=== Inscription ===
==== Latin transliteration ====
sloþi auk * rahnfriþ * þau * litu * biþi * bro * k(i)ara * a... * (s)...in * ra-(s)n * eftiʀ ihulbiarn * sun sin *

==== Old Norse transcription ====
Sloði ok Ragnfriðr þau letu baði bro gæra o[k] s[tæ]in ræ[i]sa æftiʀ Igulbiorn, sun sinn.

==== English translation ====
Slóði and Ragnfríðr, they both had the bridge made and the stone raised in memory of Ígulbjôrn, their son.

== Gallery ==
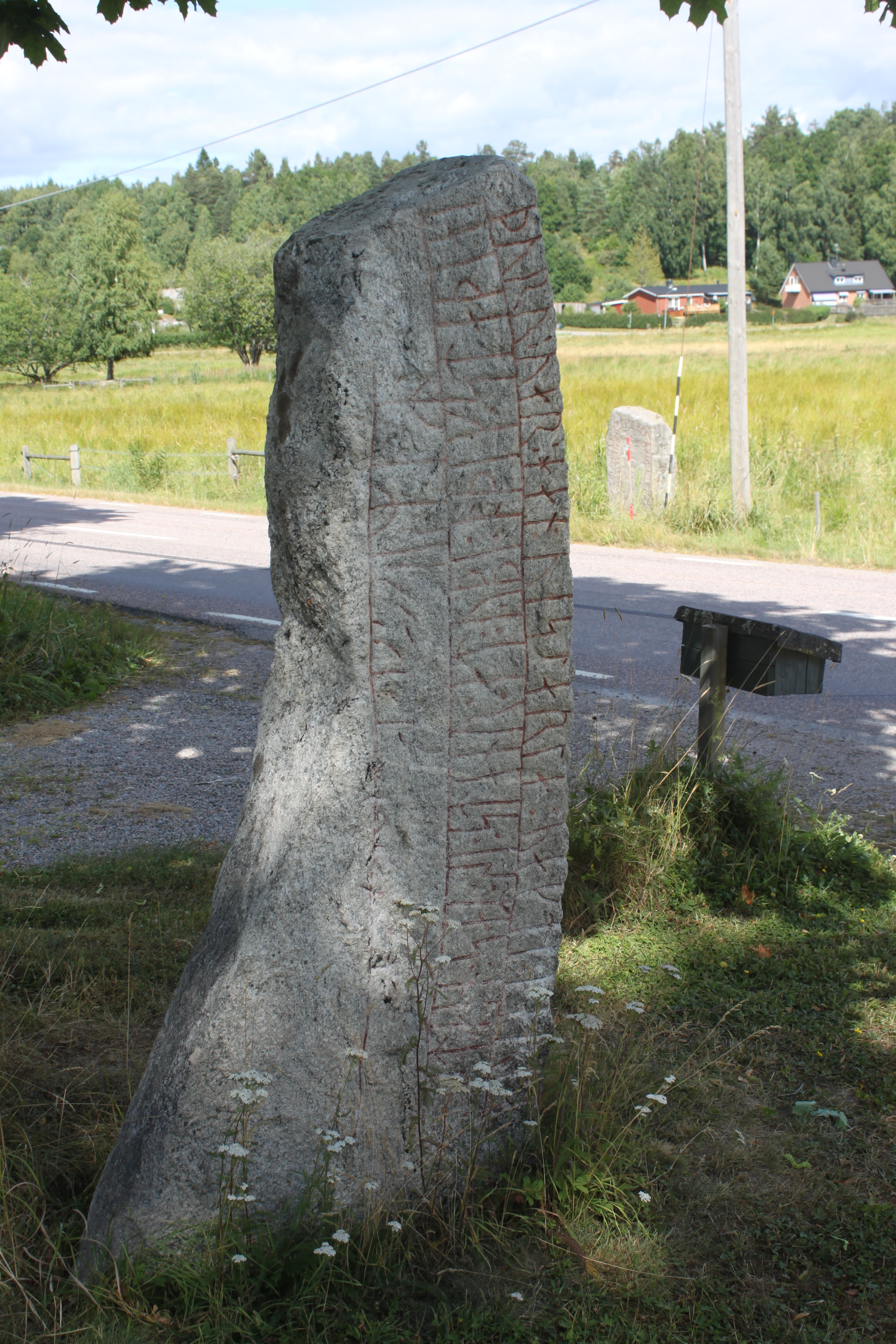
Side B of Sö 137.

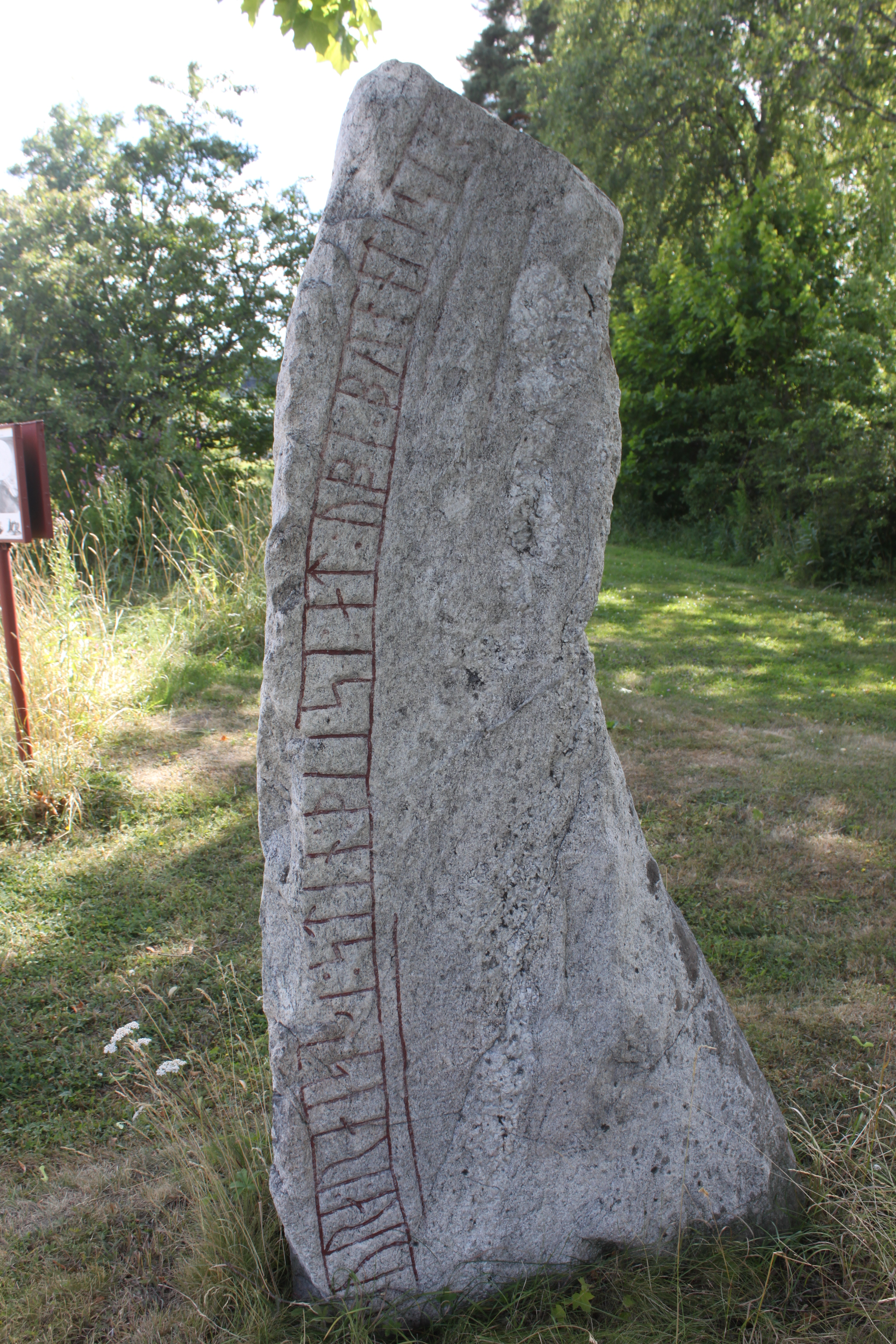
Side A of Sö 137.

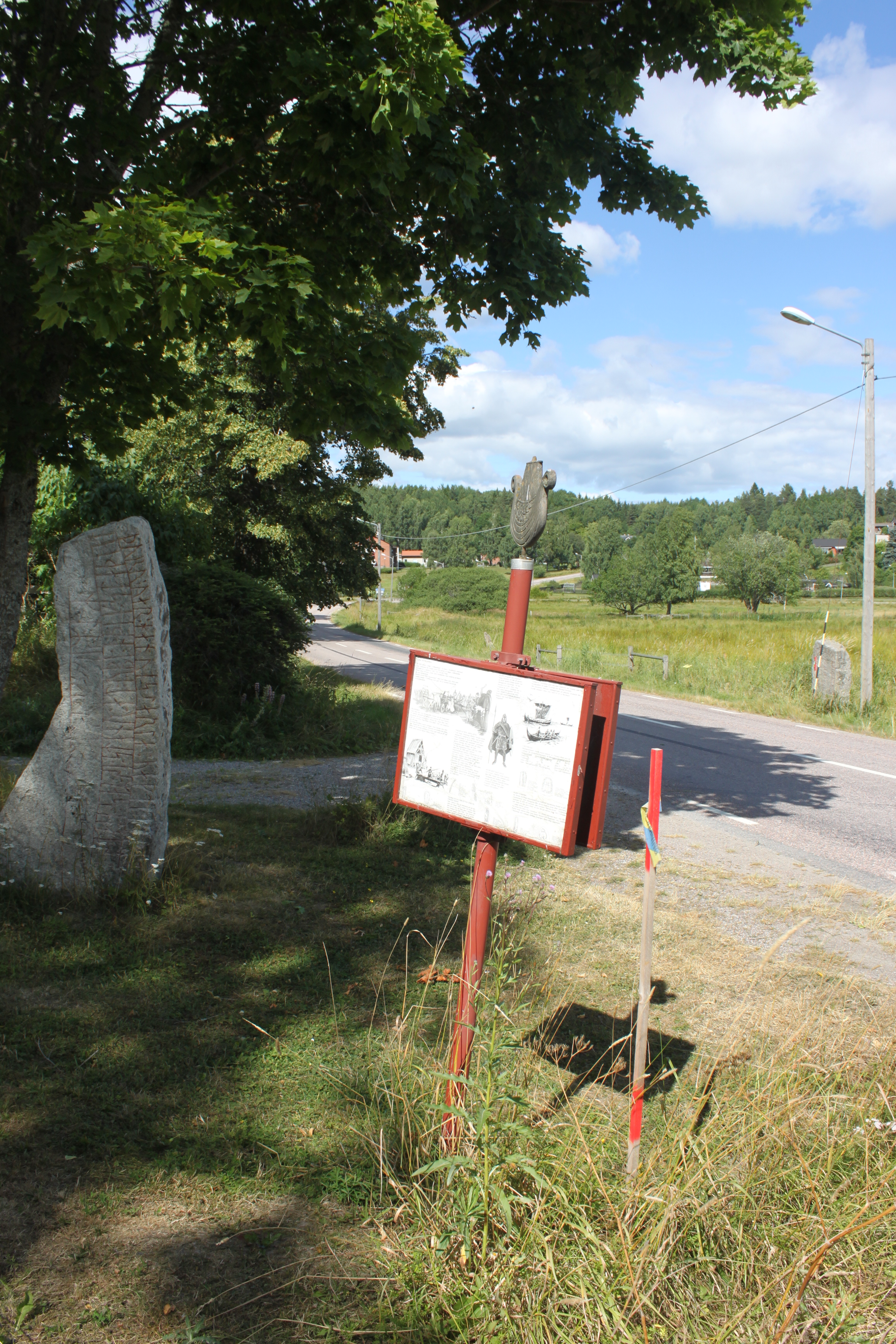
Sö 137 and Sö 138.

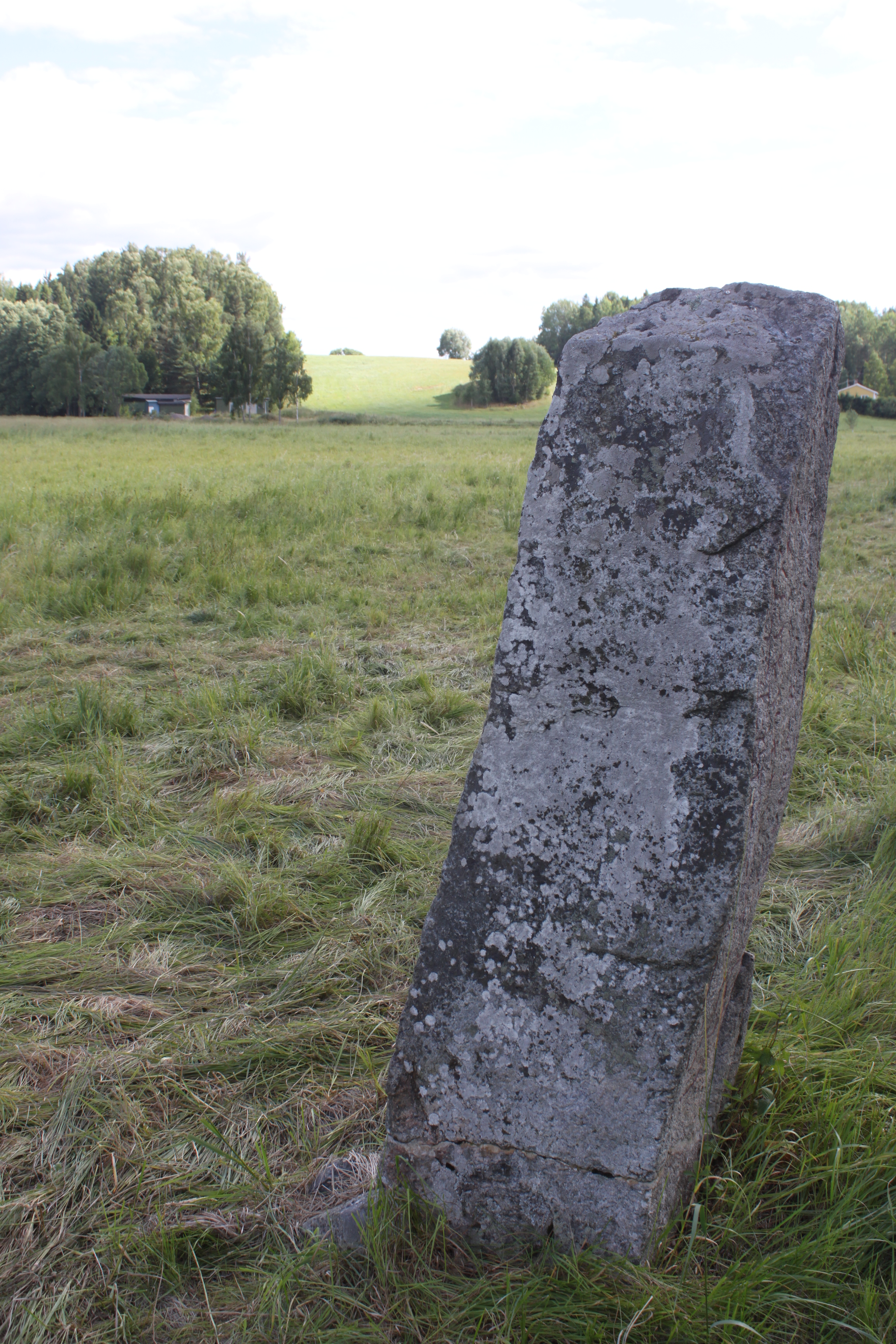
Side of Sö 138.

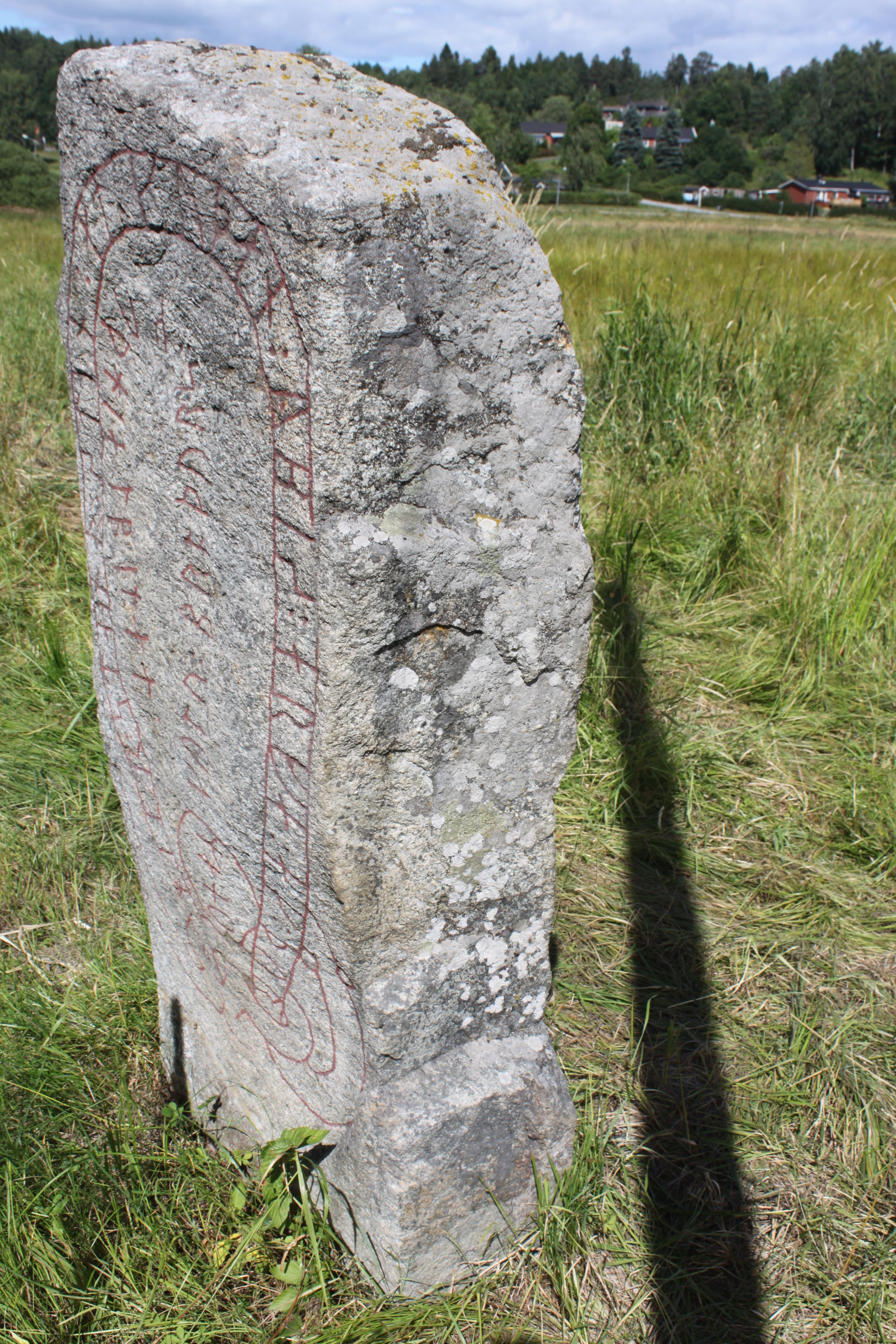
Side of Sö 138.

== See also ==
- List of runestones
