= Simris Runestones =

11th-century runestones in Scania, Sweden

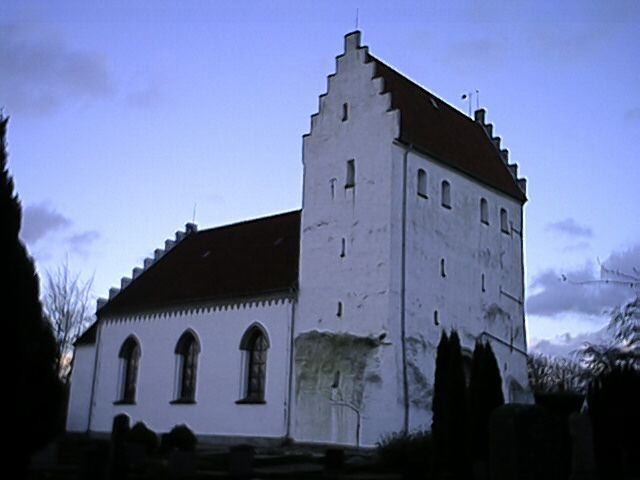
The church of Simris where the runestones were found.

The Simris Runestones are two 11th-century runestones located at the vicarage of Simris, near Simrishamn, in southeasternmost Scania, Sweden. They were rediscovered in a church wall in 1716 during a restoration of the church. Although the territory was Danish at the time, they were made in the Swedish style of Uppland. One of the stones is notable in being one of the earliest native Scandinavian documents that mention Sweden.

== DR 344 ==
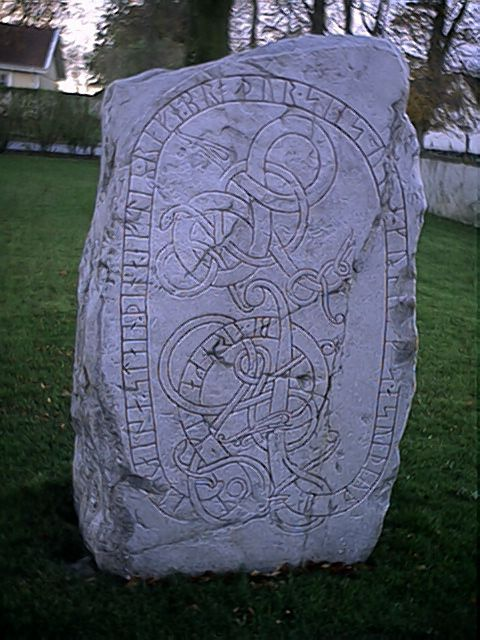
DR 344.

This runestone is dated to the second half of the 11th century as it is carved in runestone style Pr4, which is also known as Urnes style, and includes a design using serpent with its head depicted as seen from the side. Based on stylistic, linguistic, and rune-selection grounds, it has long been considered to have been made by a Swedish runemaster. It is made of sandstone and is 1.7 meters in height. This runestone was raised by Bjôrngeirr in memory of a brother called Hrafn ("Raven") who served a lord named Gunnulfr in Sweden. This runestone, together with the runestones Sö Fv1948;289 and DR 216, is one of the earliest native Scandinavian documents that mention Sweden.

=== Transliteration of the runes into Latin characters ===
* biarngaiʀ × lit (*) raisa * stain * þina * eftiʀ * rafn * broþur * sin * su(i)n * kun(u)--s * a suiþiuþu

=== Transcription into Old Norse ===
Biarngeʀ let resa sten þænna æftiʀ Rafn, broþur sin, swen Gunu[lf]s a Sweþiuþu.

=== Translation in English ===
Bjôrngeirr had this stone raised in memory of Hrafn, his brother, Gunnulfr's lad in Sweden.

== DR 345 ==
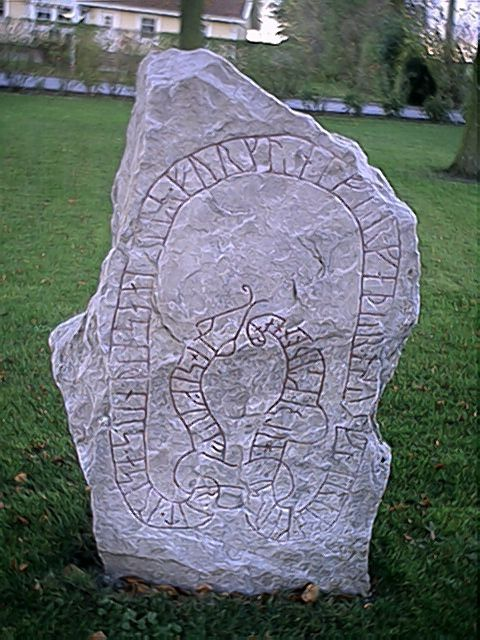
DR 345.

This runestone is dated to the first half of the 11th century and it is runestone style Fp and features text within a serpent with its head depicted as seen from overhead. The stone is made of sandstone and is 1.5 meters in height. Similar to DR 344, the runic inscription has long been considered to have been carved by a Swedish runemaster. It is believed to honor one of Canute the Great's warriors. Canute was king in Denmark from 1018 to 1035. The two other names mentioned in the runic text, Sigreifr and Forkunnr, are personal names familiar in Sweden but not in Denmark during the Middle Ages, supporting the attribution of Swedish influence.

=== Transliteration of the runes into Latin characters ===
× sigrif¶r : let * resa * sten : þensa : aiftiʀ * forkun : if--r * faþur : osulfs : triks : knus ¶ * hilbi : kuþ : on : hans

=== Transcription into Old Norse ===
Sigrefʀ let resa sten þænsa æftiʀ Forkun <if--r>,/æf[ti]ʀ faþur Asulfs, drængs Knuts. Hialpi Guþ ond hans.

=== Translation in English ===
Sigreifr had this stone erected in memory of Forkunn <if--r>,/ in memory of the father of Ásulfr, Knútr's valiant man. May God help his spirit.

== See also ==
- List of runestones
