= Uppland Runic Inscription 954 =

Runestoen in Uppland, Sweden

The Uppland Runic Inscription 954 is a Viking Age runestone engraved in Old Norse with the Younger Futhark runic alphabet. It was found by Johannes Bureus, but it has disappeared. It was located near Danmark Church in Uppsala Municipality. The style is possibly Pr1.

== Inscription ==
[× þʀu : aʀrukr : fretr : ri--u : s... ...-r : helka : bruþr : sin : en : sasur : trab : han : ouk : kaþ · niþiks:uerk : seik : felka : sin : kuþ : helb : hut : has ×]
{} Þau(?) {} Øyrikʀ(?)/Au(ð)rikʀ(?) {} frændr {} ræi[st]u {} s[tæin æfti]ʀ {} Hælga, {} broður {} sinn. {} En {} Sassurr {} drap {} hann {} ok {} gærði {} niðingsverk, {} svæik {} felaga {} sinn. {} Guð {} hialp {} and {} hans. {}
"Eyríkr(?)/Auðríkr(?) and his kinsmen, they raised the stone in memory of Helgi, their brother. And Sassurr killed him and made (= did) a villainous deed, betrayed his partner. God help his spirit."

== See also ==
- List of runestones
