= List of Beowulf characters =

This is a list of Beowulf characters. Beowulf is an Old English heroic epic poem. Its creation dates to between the 8th and the 11th centuries, the only surviving manuscript dating to circa 1010. At 3183 lines, it is notable for its length. It has reached national epic status in England (although its setting is Scandinavia, not the British Isles). There are a great many characters in Beowulf ranging from historical people such as Hygelac to supernatural beings such as the dragon.

== Characters ==
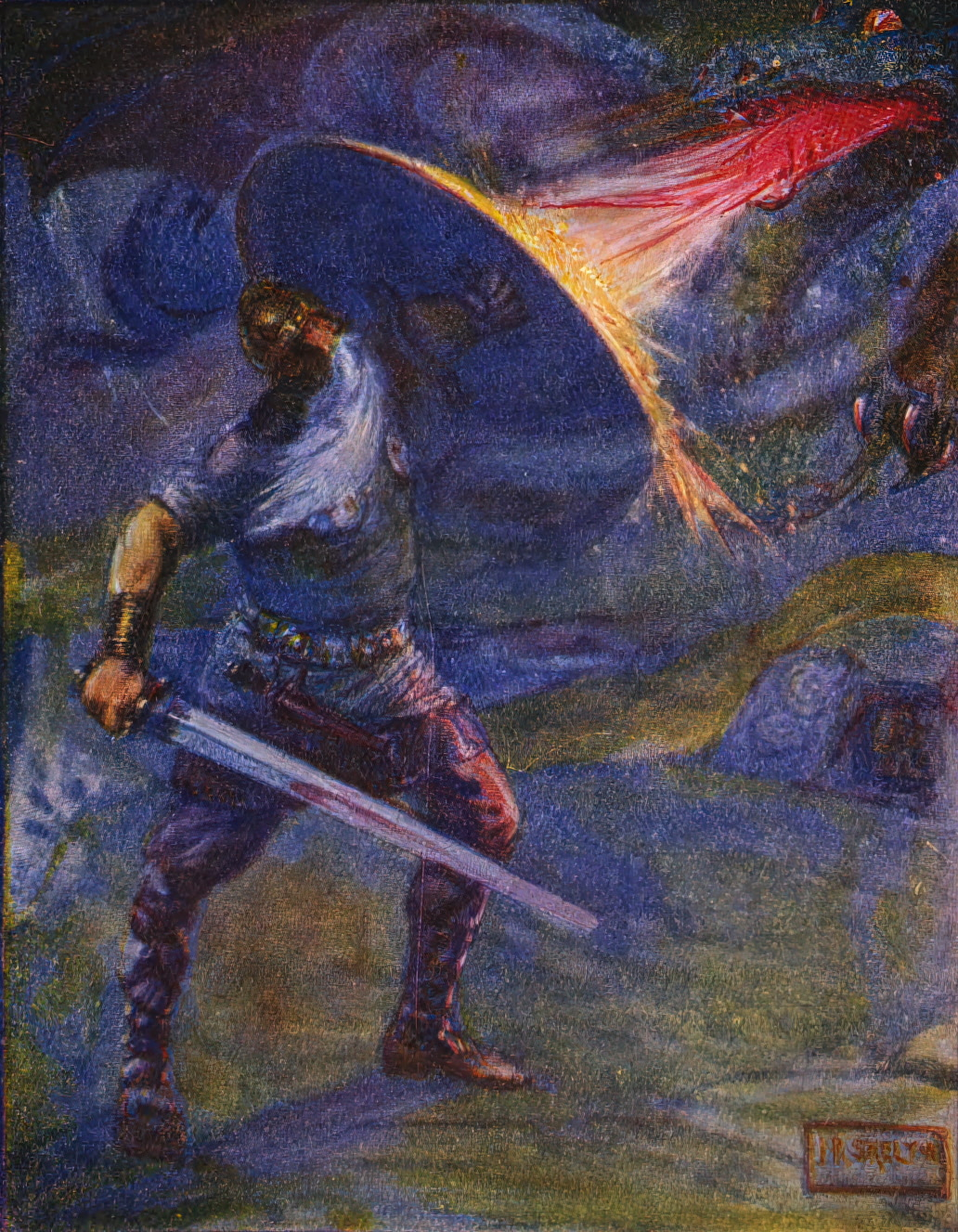
Beowulf fights the dragon, by J. R. Skelton, 1908

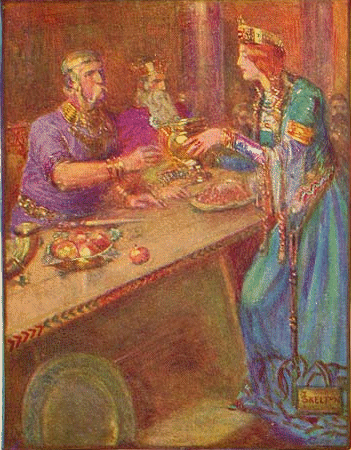
Queen Wealhþeow as hostess of the banquet, by J. R. Skelton, 1908

- Ælfhere – a kinsman of Wiglaf and Beowulf.
- Æschere – Hroðgar's closest counselor and comrade, killed by Grendel's mother.
- Banstan – the father of Breca.
- Beow or Beowulf – an early Danish king and the son of Scyld, but not the same character as the hero of the poem
- Beowulf – son of Ecgtheow, and the eponymous hero of the Anglo-Saxon poem.
- Breca – Beowulf's childhood friend who competed with him in a swimming match.
- Cain – biblical character described as an ancestor of Grendel who is infamous for killing his brother Abel, the first murder. Killing one's kin was the greatest sin in Anglo-Saxon culture.
- Dæghrefn – a Frankish warrior killed by Beowulf.
- The Dragon – beast (Old English: wyrm) that ravages Beowulf's kingdom and which Beowulf must slay at the end of the poem. It is the cause of Beowulf's death.
- Eadgils – a Swedish king also mentioned extensively in the Norse sagas.
- Eanmund – a Swedish prince, and the brother of Eadgils.
- Ecglaf – Unferð's father.
- Ecgþeow – Beowulf's father who belonged to the Swedish Wægmunding clan. He joined the Geats after having been banished for killing the Wulfing Heaðolaf, and married a Geatish princess.
- Ecgwela – an earlier Danish king.
- Elan – possibly an incomplete name for Hroðgar's sister; see Yrsa, below.
- Eofor – the "boar". A Geatish warrior who avenged the death of Hæþcyn by slaying Ongenþeow during the Swedish-Geatish wars. He was recompensed with the daughter of king Hygelac.
- Eomær – son of king Offa of Angel
- Eormenric – a semi-legendary Gothic king of the 3rd and 4th centuries, mentioned by Roman historians.
- Finn – a Frisian lord whose tale picks up where the Finnsburg Fragment ends.
- Fitela – a Germanic hero.
- Folcwalda – the father of Finn.
- Freawaru – the daughter of King Hroðgar and Queen Wealhþeow and wife of Ingeld, king of the Heaðobards.
- Froda – king of the Heaðobard's and father of Ingeld. He also appears in Norse tradition.
- Garmund – the father of Offa of Angel.
- Grendel – an eoten and one of three antagonists (along with Grendel's mother and the dragon).
- Grendel's mother – one of three antagonists (along with Grendel and the dragon). Sometimes referred to as Hag.
- Guðlaf – a warrior in Hnæf's retinue.
- Healfdene – Hroðgar's father and predecessor, also prominent in Norse tradition.
- Hama – a Germanic hero
- Halga – Hroðgar's brother. He is hardly mentioned in Beowulf but he is a prominent character in Norse tradition.
- Hæþcyn – the son of the Geatish king Hreðel.
- Hæreð – the father of Hygd, queen of the Geats.
- Heaðolaf – a Wulfing killed by Beowulf's father Ecgþeow.
- Heardred – the son of Hygelac, king of the Geats, and his queen Hygd.
- Heming – a kinsman of Garmund.
- Hengest – a Danish lord who attacked the Frisians to avenge Hnæf.
- Heorogar - Hroðgar's brother and predecessor.
- Heoroweard – Heorogar's son; Hroðgar's nephew. According to Norse tradition, his attempt to become king would cause the end of the Scylding clan.
- Herebeald – the son of the Geatish king Hreðel. Beowulf was his nephew. Herebeald was killed with an arrow by his brother Hæþcyn in a hunting accident, which caused their father Hreðel to die from grief. His story may correspond to the myth of Baldr's death in Norse mythology.
- Heremod – an early Danish king.
- Hereric – a relative of Heardred
- Hildeburh – the daughter of the Danish king Hoc and the wife of the Finn, king of the Frisians.
- Hnæf – the son of the Danish lord Hoc and brother of Hildeburh. He was killed by Finn.
- Hoc – a Danish lord and the father of Hildeburh and Hnæf.
- Hondscio – a Geatish warrior. He is killed and devoured by Grendel, right before Beowulf fights and defeats the monster.
- Hreðel – king of the Geats.
- Hreðric and Hroðmund – the two sons of Hroðgar.
- Hroðgar – king of the Danes; married to Wealhþeow. Also prominent in Norse tradition.
- Hroðulf (also known as Hrólfr Kraki) – Hroðgar's nephew, but more prominent in Norse tradition.
- Hygd – queen of the Geats; the wife of King Hygelac.
- Hygelac – king of the Geats; the husband of Hygd. Existence attested by other sources. Death during the poem dated to c 516.
- Ingeld – a Heaðobard lord; married to Freawaru, daughter of Hroðgar. He also appears in Norse tradition.
- Merewing – a Frankish king.
- Modþryð – a princess, later queen, who punished inferiors who looked her directly in the eye; later marries, and is reformed by, Offa of Angel.
- Offa of Angel – a king of the Angles who also appears in Norse tradition.
- Ohthere – king of the Swedish house of Scylfings, and also mentioned in Norse tradition. The father of Eadgils and Eanmund, and the brother of Onela.
- Onela – king of the Swedish house of Scylfings, and also mentioned in Norse tradition. The brother of Ohthere.
- Ongenþeow–- king of Sweden. Slew the Geatish king Hæþcyn, but was himself killed by Eofor, during the Swedish-Geatish wars.
- Oslaf – a warrior in Hnæf's retinue.
- Scyld – (Scyld Scēfing) warrior king who founded the ruling house in Denmark.
- Sigemund – a legendary Germanic hero whom Beowulf is compared to.
- Swerting – the grandfather of Hygelac.
- Unferð – a thegn of the Danish lord Hroðgar.
- Wæls – the father of Sigemund
- Wayland Smith – a smith of Germanic legend who forged Beowulf's breastplate.
- Wealhþeow – queen of the Danes; married to Hroðgar.
- Weohstan – the father of Wiglaf and a Swedish warrior fighting for Onela. He also appears to be mentioned in a stanza in the Prose Edda.
- Wiglaf – Beowulf's relative. A Swedish warrior of the Waegmunding clan who helps Beowulf slay the dragon.
- Wondred – the father of Eofor and Wulf.
- Wulf – the brother of Eofor.
- Wulfgar (wolf + spear) – the herald of Hroðgar, renowned for his great wisdom.
- Yrmenlaf – younger brother of Æschere.
- Yrs(e) – a character borrowed from Norse tradition that appears in some translations (e.g., Burton Raffel) and commentaries, as an emendation of a corrupt line (62) where Hroðgar's sister is mentioned. His sister is, however, named Signy in Norse tradition (Skjöldunga saga and Hrólfr Kraki's saga), whereas Yrsa was Halga's daughter and lover with whom he had Hroðulf.

== Tribes and clans ==
Beowulf tribes and locations. See also Scandza for Scandinavia's political fragmentation in the 6th century.

- Brondings – the people of Breca.
- Danes – a tribe having their centre on the island of Zealand.
- Geats – a tribe whose centre was in modern Västergötland.
- Finns – Balto-Finnic peoples inhabiting Finland and Estonia.
- Franks – a powerful Germanic tribe on the Continent.
- Frisians – a tribe led by Finn living along the eastern shores of the North Sea.
- Gifðas – the Gepids, a tribe which had migrated to the Balkans by the time of Beowulf. They are mentioned in connection with Swedes and Danes, and it has been suggested that Beowulf refers to the people of Östergötland.
- Heathobards, or Heaðo-beardnas – a clan or tribe at war with the Danes.
- Helmings – the people of queen Wealhþeow. Widsith mentions Helm as the leader of the Wulfings.
- Hetware – a tribe part of the Franks, or allied with them.
- Hugas – a name for the Franks or for a group of their allies.
- Heaðoræmas – a tribe named Heaðoreamas appears in Widsith, and reamas agrees with ON Raumar which positions the tribe in what is today south-eastern Norway.
- Ingwins – a name used for the Danes and which means "friends of Ing (Freyr)".
- Jutes (Eotenas) – a tribe living in modern Jutland, and who took part in the migration to England.
- Merewioingas, i.e. Merovingians – the ruling Frankish dynasty, by metonymy used to refer to the Frankish nation as a whole.
- Sceadugenga – Shadow-Walkers.
- Scylding – the ruling clan in Denmark, by metonymy also used to refer to the Danish nation as a whole.
- Scylfing – the ruling clan in Sweden, by metonymy also used to refer to the Swedish nation as a whole.
- Swedes – a tribe who had their centre in modern Uppland.
- Wægmundings – a Swedish clan to which belonged Beowulf, Ecgþeow and Wiglaf. Wiglaf is called "the last of the Wægmundings".
- Wendlas – the people of Vendsyssel, the northernmost part of Jutland.
- Wulfing – the clan of Heaðolaf and possibly Wealhþeow. Old Norse sources describe them as the lords of Östergötland.

== Sources ==
- Modern English translation by John Lesslie Hall
- Old English edition edited by James Albert Harrison and Robert Sharp
- Nerman, Birger (1925). "Det svenska rikets uppkomst".
- Porter, Dorothy (Summer–Autumn 2001). "The Social Centrality of Women in Beowulf: A New Context". The Heroic Age: A Journal of Early Medieval Northwestern Europe, heroicage.org, Issue 5. Archived from the original on 2006-08-19.
- Ståhl, Harry (1976), Ortnamn och ortnamnsforskning, Uppsala: Almquist & Wiksell, ISBN 91-20-04466-6
