= Swedish–Geatish wars =

Semi-legendary 6th-century battles

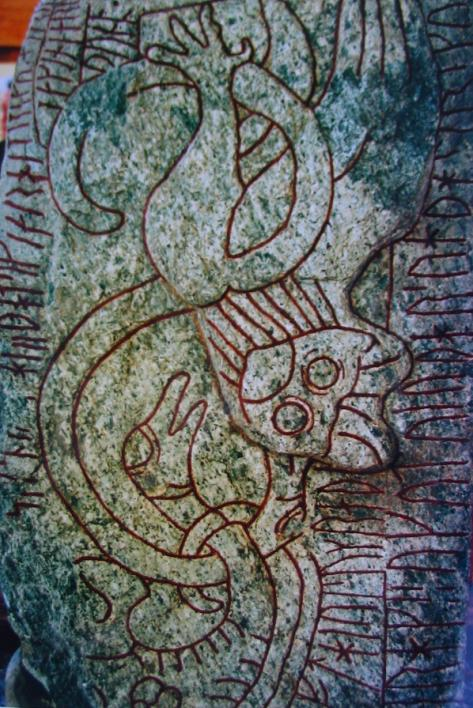
The famous Sparlösa Runestone raised in the Geatish heartland, in Västergötland, mentions a great battle, the names Eric and Alrik and the father who resided in Uppsala. Possibly a memorial to Swedish royalty, who had won a great battle.

The Swedish–Geatish wars refer to semi-legendary 6th-century battles between Swedes and Geats that are described in the Anglo-Saxon epic Beowulf. Little has survived of such battles in the Norse sagas, and later 11th-century/13th-century wars between Swedes and Geats, notably involving the Geatish clans House of Stenkil and House of Sverker, are referred to as Swedish civil wars.

== The first war in Beowulf ==
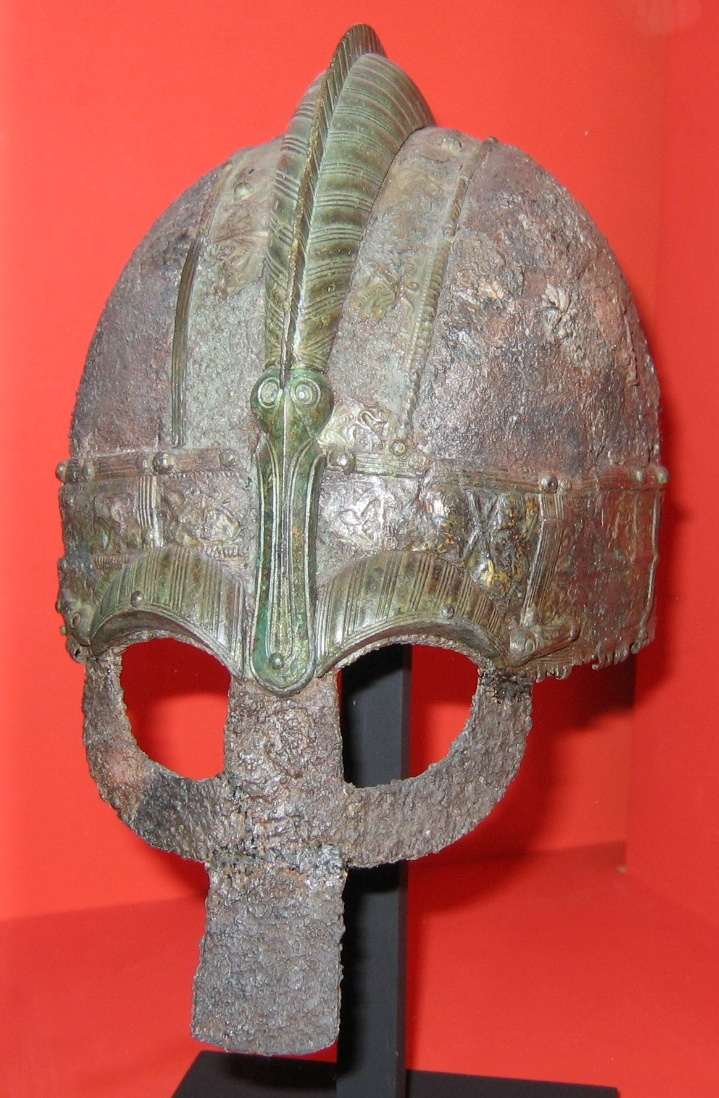
Vendel-era helmet, at the Swedish Museum of National Antiquities.

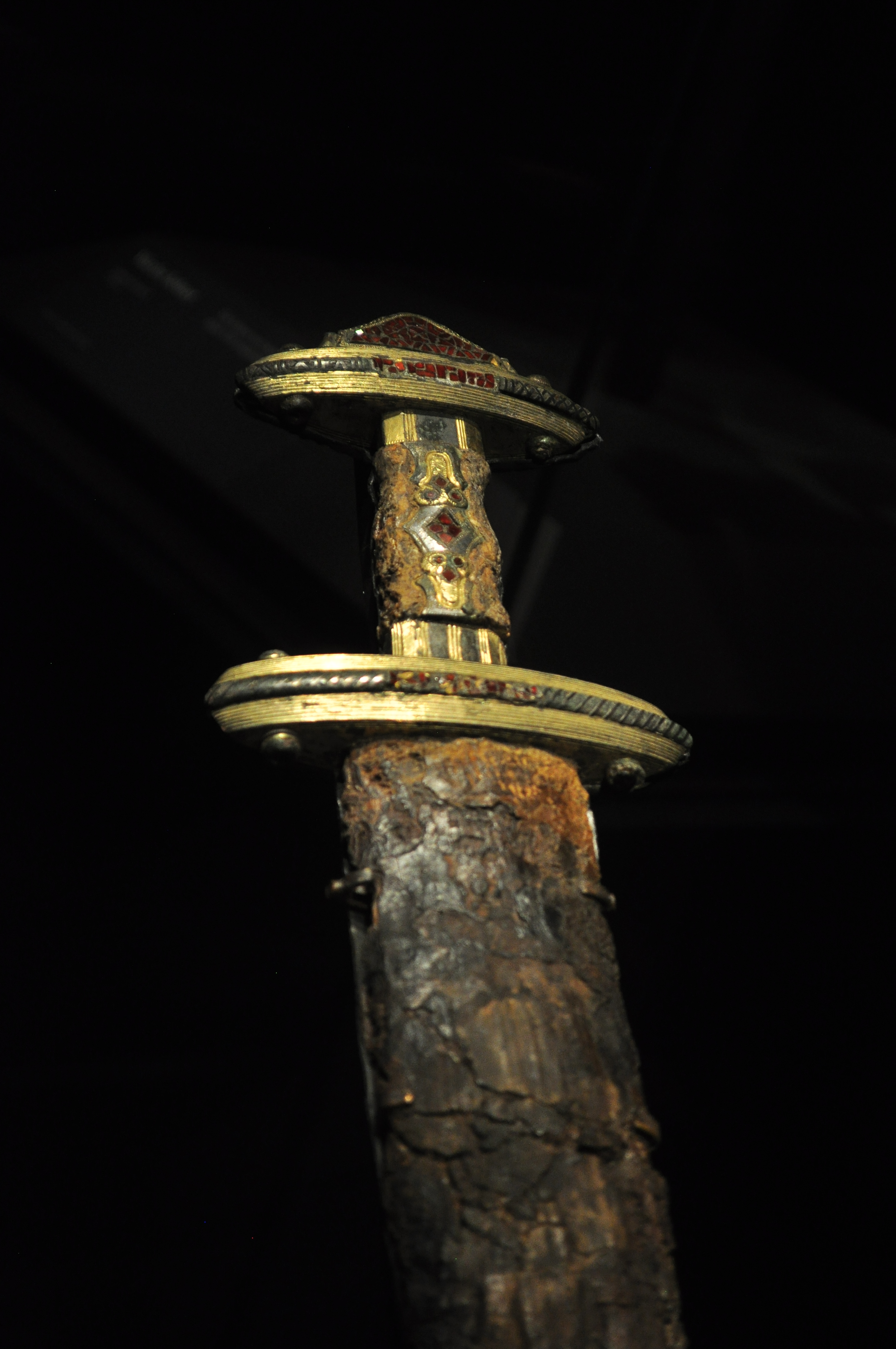
Vendel-era sword from Valsgärde.

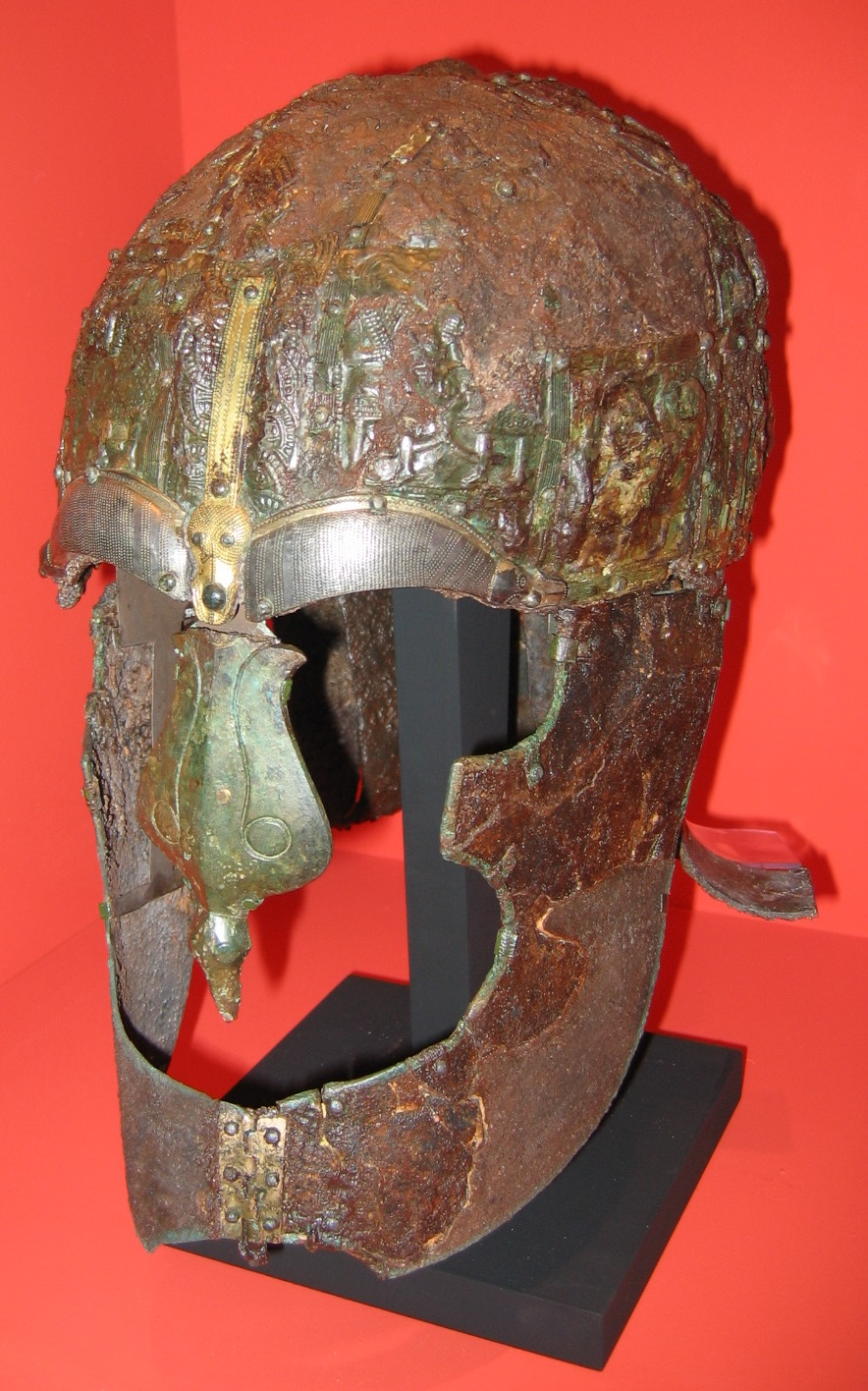
A Vendel-era Spangenhelm at the Swedish Museum of National Antiquities.

The Anglo-Saxon epic relates that the Swedes did not keep the peace when the Geatish king Hreðel had died, because the Swedish king Ongenþeow's sons (i.e. Ohthere and Onela) had grown up and were eager to fight. Lines 2472–2478 read:

Þa wæs synn and sacu · Swēona ond Ġēata,
ofer wīd wæter · wrōht ġemǣne,
herenīð hearda, · syððan Hrēðel swealt,
oð ðe him Ongenðeowes · eaferan wǣran
frome fyrdhwate, · frēode ne woldon
ofer heafo healdan, ac ymb Hrēosna Beorh
eatolne inwitscear · oft ġefremedon.

Translation:

There was strife and struggle 'twixt Swede and Geat
o'er the width of waters; war arose,
hard battle-horror, when Hrethel died,
and Ongentheow's offspring grew
strife-keen, bold, nor brooked o'er the seas;
pact of peace, but pushed their hosts
to harass in hatred by Hreosnabeorh.

The Geats, under their new king Hæþcyn, captured the Swedish queen, but old king Ongenþeow saved her at a hill fort called Hrefnesholt, although they lost her gold. Ongenþeow killed Hæþcyn and besieged the Geats at Hrefnesholt. The Geats were, however, rescued by Hygelac, Hæþcyn's brother, who arrived the next day with reinforcements. Having lost the battle, but rescued his queen, Ongenþeow and his warriors returned home. Lines 2946–2951:

Wæs sīo swātswaðu · Swēona ond Ġēata,
wælrǣs weora · wīde ġesȳne,
hū ðā folc mid him · fǣhðe tōwehton.
Ġewāt him ðā se gōda · mid his gædelingum,
frōd felaġeōmor · eorl Ongenþīo
fæsten sēċean, · ufor onċirde;

Translation:

The bloody swath of Swedes and Geats
and the storm of their strife, were seen afar,
how folk against folk the fight had wakened.
The ancient king with his atheling band
sought his citadel, sorrowing much:
Ongentheow earl went up to his burg.

However, the war was not over. Hygelac, the new king of the Geats, attacked the Swedes. Lines 2959b–2960:

Þā wæs ǣht boden
Swēona lēodum, · seġn Hiġelāces
freoðowong þone · forð oferēodon,
syððan Hrēðlingas · tō hagan þrungon.

Translation:

Yet after him came
with slaughter for Swedes the standards of Hygelac
o'er peaceful plains in pride advancing,
till Hrethelings fought in the fenced town.

The Geatish warriors Eofor and Wulf Wonreding fought together against the hoary king Ongenþeow. Wulf hit Ongenþeow's head with his sword so that the old king bled over his hair, but the king hit back and wounded Wulf. Then, Eofor retaliated by cutting through the Swedish king's shield and through his helmet, giving Ongenþeow a death-blow. Eofor took the Swedish king's helmet, sword and breastplate, and carried them to Hygelac. When they came home, Eofor and Wulf were richly awarded, and Eofor was given Hygelac's daughter. Because of this battle, Hygelac is referred to as Ongenþeow's slayer.

== The second war in Beowulf ==
In Sweden, both Ongenþeow and Ohthere were apparently dead as Onela was king, and Ohthere's two sons, Eanmund and Eadgils, sought refuge with Heardred, Hygelac's successor as king of the Geats. This caused Onela to attack the Geats. During the battle, Eanmund was killed by Onela's champion Weohstan and Heardred was killed as well. Onela returned home and Beowulf became king of the Geats.

Eadgils, however, survived, and, later, Beowulf helped him avenge Eanmund by slaying Onela, an event which also appears in Scandinavian sources, as the Battle on the Ice of Lake Vänern (although no Geatish involvement is remembered or mentioned).

== The foreboding of a third war in Beowulf ==
As Wiglaf sat beside the dead king Beowulf, he spoke of a new war with the Swedes that would surely come. Lines 2999–3007a:

Þæt ys sīo fǣhðo · ond se fēondscipe,
wælnīð wera, · ðæs ðe iċ wēn hafo,
þē ūs sēċeað tō · Swēona lēoda,
syððan hīe ġefricgeað · frēan ūserne
ealdorlēasne, · þone ðe ǣr ġehēold
wið hettendum · hord ond rīċe
æfter hæleða hryre, · hwate Scilfingas,
folcrēd fremede, · oððe furður ġēn
eorlscipe efnde.

Translation:

Such is the feud, the foeman's rage,
death-hate of men: so I deem it sure
that the Swedish folk will seek us home
for this fall of their friends, the fighting-Scylfings,
when once they learn that our warrior leader
lifeless lies, who land and hoard
ever defended from all his foes,
furthered his folk's weal, finished his course
a hardy hero.

== Aftermath ==
According to a Scandinavian legend written down in the 13th century, in the Ynglinga saga, a 7th-century Geatish king named Algaut was invited to his son-in-law, the Swedish king Ingjald, at Uppsala. During the night, he was burned to death together with a number of other invited kings. Ingjald then extended his rule to include the Geatish heartland in Västergötland, whereas the East Geats in Östergötland preserved their independence. The Geats and the other Scandinavians were later united by Ivar Vidfamne.

Sögubrot af nokkrum fornkonungum says that after Ivar's death, the kingdom was split between Harald Wartooth and Sigurd Hring. Harald ruled Denmark and the East Geats, whereas Sigurd Hring ruled Sweden and the West Geats. These and many sources describe how these two kings met in the legendary and enormous Battle of the Brávellir (c. 750), where Sigurd Hring was victorious and became the king of both Swedes, Geats and Danes. From this battle and onwards, all of Geatland is described as part of the Swedish kingdom.

In the 12th century, Geatish tribal independence was but a memory as the Danish chronicler Saxo Grammaticus noted in his Gesta Danorum (book 13) that the Geats had no say in the election of the king, only the Swedes. It says even more of their loss of independence that when the Law of the West Geats was put to paper, in the 13th century, the law stated that the election and the deposing of the king rested with the Swedes and not with the Geats.

In 1442, the law of the Swedish, Norwegian and Danish king Christopher of Bavaria declared that the merging of Geatland into the Swedish kingdom took place in a distant pagan time.

== Bibliography ==
- Lundström, I. (1972). Viking, viking. Forntidsdröm och verklighet. Statens historiska museum, Stockholm. p. 6.
- Nerman, B. (1925). Det svenska rikets uppkomst. Stockholm.
