= Heardred =

Heardred (Proto-Norse *Harðurāðaz), died c. 530, is the son of Hygelac, king of the Geats, and his queen Hygd, in Beowulf. After Hygelac's death, in Frisia, Hygd wants to make Hygelac's nephew Beowulf, king of Geatland, as she fears that the young Heardred won't be able to defend his people. Beowulf, however, declares his trust in the young man and Heardred is proclaimed king.

However, further north in Sweden (then restricted to Svealand), the Swedish king Ohthere dies and is succeeded by his younger brother Onela. Ohthere's sons Eadgils and Eanmund flee to the Geats and are received by Heardred. This makes Onela attack the Geats to neutralize his nephews, and to avenge his father Ongentheow, who had been killed by the Geats. During the battle Heardred is killed. Eanmund is slain by his kinsman Weohstan.

Heardred is succeeded by his cousin Beowulf, who avenges Eanmund by helping Eadgils kill Onela, an event which also appears in Scandinavian sources.

Hrethlings

Swerting (Note: The relationship between Swerting and Hreðel is not clear from the poem. He may also have been his father, or his brother-in-law.)
daughter	Hreðel
Herebeald	Hæþcyn	Hygelac	daughter	Ecgþeow
Hygd	Beowulf
Heardred	daughter	Eofor

Notes

Legendary titles
Preceded by Hygelac	(legendary) King of the Geats	Succeeded by Beowulf
