= Hygd =

Mention of Hygd in Beowulf

Hygd, introduced in line 1925 of the poem Beowulf, is married to of King Hygelac of Geatland. She is the daughter of Hæreth.

After Beowulf defeats Grendel and Grendel's mother, he and his men returned to their native country, where they are received by Hygelac and Hygd. Hygd is beautiful, wise, courteous, and attentive. She pours mead in the drinking horns of the warriors thus fulfilling (in the same vein as Wealhþeow, the queen of Denmark) the important role of hostess and cup-bearer in the poem. The poet juxtaposes this virtue with the vice of Queen Modþryð (who appears in line 1932).

Beowulf gives her three horses and a magnificent torc (the Brosing, i.e. Brisingamen, the necklace of the goddess Freyja) that he received from Wealhþeow.

Hygd shows her wisdom and love for the Geatish people when her husband falls in the raid in Frisia against the Franks. Instead of securing the throne for her own offspring, she offers it to Beowulf as she considers her son Heardred to be too inexperienced to defend Geatland against the Swedes. Beowulf, however, talks in favour of young Heardred and convinces her to proclaim him King of the Geats instead.

Two Swedish princes, Eadgils and Eanmund, arrive and ask for protection as their uncle Onela had usurped the Swedish throne. Heardred graciously offers them his protection, which leads to a Swedish invasion in which Heardred is slain. The Swedish warrior Weohstan kills Eanmund, and Beowulf can no longer refuse Hygd's offer of kingship.

Hrethlings

Swerting (Note: The relationship between Swerting and Hreðel is not clear from the poem. He may also have been his father, or his brother-in-law.)
daughter	Hreðel
Herebeald	Hæþcyn	Hygelac	daughter	Ecgþeow
Hygd	Beowulf
Heardred	daughter	Eofor
