= Ecgþeow =

Character in Beowulf

Ecgþēow (pronounced [ˈedʒθeːow]), Edgetho (Proto-Norse *Agiþewaz), or Ecgtheow is a character in the Anglo-Saxon epic Beowulf. He is not mentioned outside the Bēowulf manuscript, and it is not known whether he was based on a real person. He belonged to a probably Swedish family (an ätt, see Norse clans) called the Waegmundings. He married the daughter of Hreðel, king of the Geats, and was the father of Bēowulf.

His name could be read as eċġ + þēow, "edge-servant" (that is, sword-thane); alternatively, if his name was a compound of the ancient bahuvrihi type as were many other Germanic heroic names, it would indicate proficiency with the sword, meaning literally, "whose servant is the sword".

He is first mentioned in Bēowulf at lines 262–266, when Beowulf tells the coast-guard that "My father was known to everyone," calls him a "noble battle-leader", and says that he died after living through "many winters" and that he is remembered well by wise men everywhere.

At lines 372–375, Hroðgar, the Danish king, recalls Ecgtheow, remembering that he married King Hreðel's only daughter.

At lines 456–472, Hroðgar recalls the story of how Ecgtheow once came to him for help: he had slain Heaðolaf, a man from another tribe called the Wulfings (probably the rulers of the East Geats). One of the Germanic ways of resolving a blood feud was either to pay a wergild (Anglo-Saxon, "man-price") or to be banished. Either Ecgþēow's people could not pay a wergild, or the Wulfings refused to accept it from them; so Ecgþeow had to leave home. He went to Dane-Land; Hrōðgār paid the wergild, and Ecgþeow swore oaths of friendship to him.

The Wulfings were probably the same as the Wylfings mentioned in Widsith, and according to Widsith one of their lords was Helm. Hroðgar married Wealhþeow, a Helming lady, who thus likely belonged to the Wulfings, and this may explain why Ecgþeow went to Dane-Land particularly. Hroðgar may have been able to use his family ties to persuade the Wulfings to accept the wergild and end the feud.

Hroðgar interprets Beowulf's journey as a son's gratitude for what Hrōðgār had done for Beowulf's father.

At lines 2428–2429 we learn that the young Bēowulf was fostered and raised in the home of Hreðel starting when he was seven years old; Ecgþēow may have died by then, or the family may just have been following a custom.

At lines 2813–2815 we learn that the thane Wiglaf is a Waegmunding; therefore his father Weohstan was in some way related to Ecgþeow.

The Hrethlings (Kings of the Geats), according to Beowulf

Swerting (Note: The relationship between Swerting and Hreðel is not clear from the poem. He may also have been his father, or his brother-in-law.)
daughter	Hreðel ♕	Hæreð
Herebeald	Hæþcyn ♕	Hygelac ♕	Hygd	daughter	Ecgþeow
Heardred ♕	daughter	Eofor	Beowulf ♕
