= Grendel (novel) =

1971 novel by John Gardner

- First edition 1971 cover
- Author: John Gardner
- Cover artist: Emil Antonucci
- Language: English
- Genre: European mythology Fantasy novel Postmodern literature
- Publisher: Alfred A. Knopf (USA) & Gollancz (UK)
- Publication date: 1971
- Publication place: USA
- Media type: Print (Hardback & Paperback)
- Pages: 174 (hardback edition USA); 144 (paperback edition UK)
- ISBN: 0-394-47143-1 (hardback edition USA) & ISBN 0-575-07582-1 (paperback edition UK)
- OCLC: 161732
- Dewey Decimal: 813/.5/4
- LC Class: PZ4.G23117 Gr PS3557.A712

Grendel is a 1971 novel by the American author John Gardner. It is a retelling of part of the Old English poem Beowulf from the perspective of the antagonist, Grendel. In the novel, Grendel is portrayed as an antihero. The novel deals with finding meaning in the world, the power of literature and myth, and the nature of good and evil.

In a 1973 interview, Gardner said, "In Grendel I wanted to go through the main ideas of Western civilization – which seemed to me to be about ... twelve? – and go through them in the voice of the monster, with the story already taken care of, with the various philosophical attitudes (though with Sartre in particular), and see what I could do, see if I could break out." On another occasion, he noted that he used Grendel to "represent Sartre's philosophical position" and that "a lot of Grendel is borrowed from sections of Sartre's Being and Nothingness".

Grendel has become one of Gardner's most renowned and acclaimed works. Several editions of the novel contain pen and ink line drawings of Grendel's head, by Emil Antonucci. Ten years after publication, the novel was adapted into the 1981 animated film Grendel Grendel Grendel.

== Background ==
The basic plot derives from Beowulf, a heroic poem of unknown authorship written in Old English and preserved in a manuscript dating from around AD 1000. The poem deals with the heroic exploits of the Geat warrior Beowulf, who battles three antagonists: Grendel, Grendel's mother and, later in life, an unnamed dragon. Gardner's retelling, however, presents the story from the existentialist view of Grendel, exploring the history of the characters before Beowulf arrives. Beowulf himself plays a relatively small role in the novel, but he is still the only human hero that can match and kill Grendel. The dragon plays a minor part as an omniscient and bored character, whose wisdom is limited to telling Grendel "to seek out gold and sit on it"; his one action in the novel is to endow Grendel with the magic ability to withstand attacks by sword (a quality Gardner found in the original).

Gardner himself explained that his Grendel character is modeled on Jean-Paul Sartre, with whom Gardner claimed to have a love-hate relationship: "He's a horror intellectually, figuratively, and morally, but he's a wonderful writer and anything he says you believe, at least for the moment, because of the way he says it ... What happened in Grendel was that I got the idea of presenting the Beowulf monster as Jean-Paul Sartre, and everything that Grendel says Sartre in one mood or another has said."

== Plot ==
In the opening scene, Grendel briefly fights with a ram when frustrated with its stupidity. He then mockingly asks the sky why animals lack sense and dignity; the sky does not reply, adding to his frustration. (Note: Joseph Tuso argued that the scene parodies the opening of Chaucer's Canterbury Tales, marking for instance the ram as a reference to Chaucer's astrological ram, in line 8.) Grendel then passes through his cave and encounters his mute mother before venturing out into the night where he attacks Hrothgar's mead hall, called "Hart" in Grendel. Later, Grendel reminisces about his early experiences in life, beginning with his childhood days of exploring the caves inhabited by him, his mother and other creatures with whom he is unable to speak. He goes on to recount an experience from his childhood, in which he found himself painfully wedged in a tree and threatened by humans, only to be saved by his mother.

During Hrothgar's rise to power, a blind poet appears at the doors of Hart, whom Grendel calls "the Shaper". (Note: A literal translation of the word Scop.) He orates a myth in which the ancient warrior Scyld Shefing seduces Grendel. Though the story is fabricated, Grendel, listening from afar, is moved by it, and is frustrated by his emotional engagement with the Shaper's untrue stories.

When Grendel returns to his cave, he fails to communicate with his mother, leaving him feeling isolated. He floats down a subterranean river to a dragon's cave. The omniscient dragon discusses with Grendel the oratory power of the Shaper. The dragon and Grendel have a philosophical disagreement about the dragon's existential nihilism, and Grendel exits the cave angry and confused.

While listening to the Shaper, Grendel is spotted by sentries from Hart. In the fight that ensues, Grendel discovers that the dragon enchanted him, leaving him impervious to weapons. Realizing his power, he begins attacking Hart. Grendel is challenged by a thane named Unferth, whom Grendel simply mocks and refuses to fight. Grendel awakens a few days later to realize that Unferth has followed him to his cave in an act of heroic desperation. Grendel continues to mock Unferth until the thane faints from exhaustion, then takes him back to Hart to live out his days in frustrated mediocrity, thereby depriving him of the heroic death which he desired.

In the second year of his conflict with the humans of Hart, Grendel notes that his raids have destroyed the esteem of Hrothgar, allowing a rival noble named Hygmod to gain power. Fearing deposition, Hrothgar assembles an army to attack Hygmod and his people, the Helmings. Instead of a fight, Hygmod offers his sister Wealtheow to Hrothgar as a wife after a series of negotiations. The beauty of Wealtheow moves Grendel as the Shaper had once before, impeding the monster from attacking Hart. Eventually, Grendel decides to kill Wealtheow, since she threatens the ideas explained by the dragon. Upon capturing her, he realizes that killing her and not killing her would be equally meaningless acts, and he retreats, knowing that by not killing Wealtheow, he has once again confounded the logic of humanity and religion.

Later, Grendel watches as Hrothgar's nephew Hrothulf develops, through dialogue with a peasant named Red Horse, his understanding of the two classes in Danish society: thegns and peasants. Red Horse incites in Hrothulf a revolutionary spirit.

Grendel watches a religious ceremony and is approached by an old priest named Ork, who thinks that Grendel is their main deity, the Destroyer, and engages him in conversation. When three other priests approach and chastise Ork, Grendel flees, overwhelmed with a vague dread.

Watching the Danes, Grendel hears a woman predict the coming of an illustrious thegn and then witnesses the death of the Shaper. Returning to his cave, his mother seems agitated. She manages to make one unusual unintelligible word, which Grendel discounts, and then goes to the Shaper's funeral. Later, in the cave, he wakes up with his mother still making word-like noises, and once again feels a terrible foreboding.

Grendel reveals that fifteen travellers have come to Denmark from overseas. The visitors, who reveal themselves to be Geats ruled by Hygelac, have an uneasy relationship with the Danes. Upon their arrival, Grendel notices the firm nature of their leader, Beowulf, and the fact that his lips do not move in accordance with his words, and sees a great lust for violence in Beowulf's eyes, indicating to Grendel that he is insane.

At nightfall, Grendel attacks. When he believes that all the men are sleeping, he breaks into the hall and eats one man. The second man he grabs turns out to be an alert Beowulf. They wrestle furiously, during which Beowulf appears to become a flaming, dragon-like figure and repeats many of the ideas that the dragon espoused to Grendel. Beowulf rips off Grendel's arm, causing the monster to flee. Grendel proceeds to fall into an abyss (whether or not Grendel jumps is left up to the perception of the reader), and dies wondering if what he is feeling is joy.

== Characters ==
Gardner includes all featured characters from the original poem in his novel, but greatly changes many roles. Beowulf himself, for example, appears only in the last portion of the novel and has little dialogue or interaction with other characters. The author also introduces a handful of incidental minor characters.

- Grendel – the main protagonist and self-described monster, given the narrator's voice in the novel.
- Grendel's mother – another antagonist from Beowulf who lives in an underwater cave with her son. Unlike her son, she is incapable of speech and holds no curiosity of the world outside her cave.
- Beowulf – a Geatish hero who ultimately kills Grendel. He is never referred to by name in the novel. He is given qualities similar to the dragon.
- Hrothgar – warrior and king of the Danes.
- The Shaper – a blind harpist and storyteller in Hrothgar's court. He creates the Danes’ image of Grendel as a threat by telling fictional stories.
- The Shaper's assistant – the young apprentice who replaces the Shaper upon his death.
- Unferth – a Scylding warrior who challenges but fails to defeat Grendel.
- Wealtheow – queen of the Danes and wife to Hrothgar.
- Hrothulf – Hrothgar's orphaned nephew.
- Freawaru – Hrothgar's teenage daughter.
- Hygmod – King of the Helmings and Wealtheow's brother.
- The dragon – an ancient, omniscient beast guarding a vast hoard of treasure to whom Grendel goes for advice. It possibly is a figment of Grendel's imagination. It is also possible the dragon was meant to be the same dragon that appeared in the epic poem Beowulf as he does reference how he has foreseen his own death at the hands of a human, he also alludes that his death would be the end of his kind implying that he is the last dragon.
- Red Horse – Hrothulf's elderly advisor.
- Ork – an old and blind Scylding priest.

=== Portrayal of Grendel ===
The Pulitzer Prize-winning author Jane Smiley suggests that Gardner uses Grendel as a metaphor for the necessity for a dark side to everything; where a hero is only as great as the villain he faces. Using Grendel's perspective to tell at least part of the story of Beowulf in more contemporary language allows the story to be seen in a new light not only in terms of the point of view but also brings it into the modern era.

Where Grendel is portrayed mainly as a physical creature in the original work, here a glimpse into his psyche is offered. Grendel lives in isolation and loneliness with his mother, who in her old age is unable to provide any real companionship to her child. As the only being of his kind, he has no one to relate to and feels the need to be understood or have some connection. Grendel has a complex relationship with the humans who hate and fear him. He feels that he is somehow related to humanity and despite his desire to eat them, he can be moved by them and their works. His long life grants him the ability to act as a witness to how their lives transpire and their behavior and logic bewilders him. He is cursed to a life of solitude, also being portrayed as having eternal life, which furthers his plight and loneliness as he can only fall in battle and he is immune to all human weapons. He is only freed from his tormented life through his encounter with Beowulf.

== Reception ==
D. Keith Mano praised Grendel lavishly in The New York Times Book Review, writing, "John Gardner's Grendel is myth itself: permeated with revelation, with dark instincts, with swimming, riotous universals. The special profundity of Gardner's vision or visions is so thought-fertile that it shunts even his fine poet's prose to a second importance". Another Times reviewer, Richard Locke, declared the novel "an extraordinary achievement – very funny, original and deft, altogether lovable, poignant, rich with thought and feeling". Kirkus Reviews also reviewed Grendel favorably, saying, "Gardner demonstrates his agility at juggling metaphysical notions while telling a diverting tale."

The book was nominated for the 1972 Mythopoeic Award for best novel.

It was given special mention by Diana Athill in her memoir Stet, covering her decades as an editor with UK publisher André Deutsch. "Having to read Beowulf almost turned me against Oxford, so when a New York agent offered me this novel I could hardly bring myself to open it. If I hadn't, I would have missed a great pleasure – a really powerful feat of imagination."

== Film adaptations ==
An Australian-produced animated movie, Grendel Grendel Grendel, based on Gardner's novel, was released in 1981, in limited quantities on VHS. The film features the voice of Peter Ustinov as Grendel and, like the novel, is related from Grendel's point of view. It is animated, in color, and runs roughly 90 minutes. In 2004, the soundtrack to the film, by Bruce Smeaton, was released on the 1M1 Records label.

In 2024 The Jim Henson Company announced that it was developing a live-action adaptation, directed by Robert D. Krzykowski, with the title character being voiced by Jeff Bridges. The film also stars Dave Bautista as Beowulf, Bryan Cranston as King Hrothgar, Thomasin McKenzie as Queen Wealhtheow, Aiden Turner as Unferth, Sam Elliott as the voice of The Dragon, and T-Bone Burnett playing The Shaper and providing songs. John Sayles will be the executive producer.

== Musical adaptations ==
=== Rock ===
In 1982, the British neo-prog band Marillion recorded a 17-minute opus entitled "Grendel" that was based on the book. The song was initially released as a B-side to the 12-inch version of their first single, "Market Square Heroes" (now out of print). The song was also released on the compilation album B'Sides Themselves and the two-disc remastered version of their first album, Script for a Jester's Tear.

The American alternative rock band Sunny Day Real Estate recorded a song called "Grendel" that was based on the book and appeared on their 1994 debut album, Diary.

=== Opera ===
On June 8, 2006, an opera based on the novel was premiered at the Los Angeles Opera. The score was composed by Elliot Goldenthal, with a libretto by Julie Taymor and J. D. McClatchy. Taymor also directed the piece. The part of Grendel was sung by the bass-baritone Eric Owens, the dragon by the mezzo-soprano Denyce Graves, the Shaper by the tenor Richard Croft, Wealtheow by the soprano Laura Claycomb and Unferth by the tenor Jay Hunter Morris. Beowulf, a dancing role, was performed by Desmond Richardson. The opera was produced in New York City during summer 2006 at the New York State Theater as part of the Lincoln Center Festival.

== General and cited sources ==
- Gardner, John (1971). Grendel. Illustrated by Emil Antonucci. New York: Vintage Books. ISBN 0679723110.
- Gardner, John (2010) [1971]. Grendel. Random House. ISBN 978-0-307-75678-7 – via Google Books.
- Hiortdahl, Sandra (2022). Grendel Recast in John Gardner's Novel and Beowulf. Cambridge: Cambridge University Scholars. ISBN 978-1-5275-8468-6.
- Kowalcze, Anna (2003). "Disregarding the Text: Postmodern Medievalisms and the Readings of John Gardner's Grendel". In Swan, Jesse; Richard Utz (eds.). The Year's Work in Medievalism, 2002. The Year's Work in Medievalism Vol. XVII. Eugene, Oregon: Wipf and Stock Publishers. ISBN 9781725241381.
