= Ohthere =

Semi-legendary Swedish king

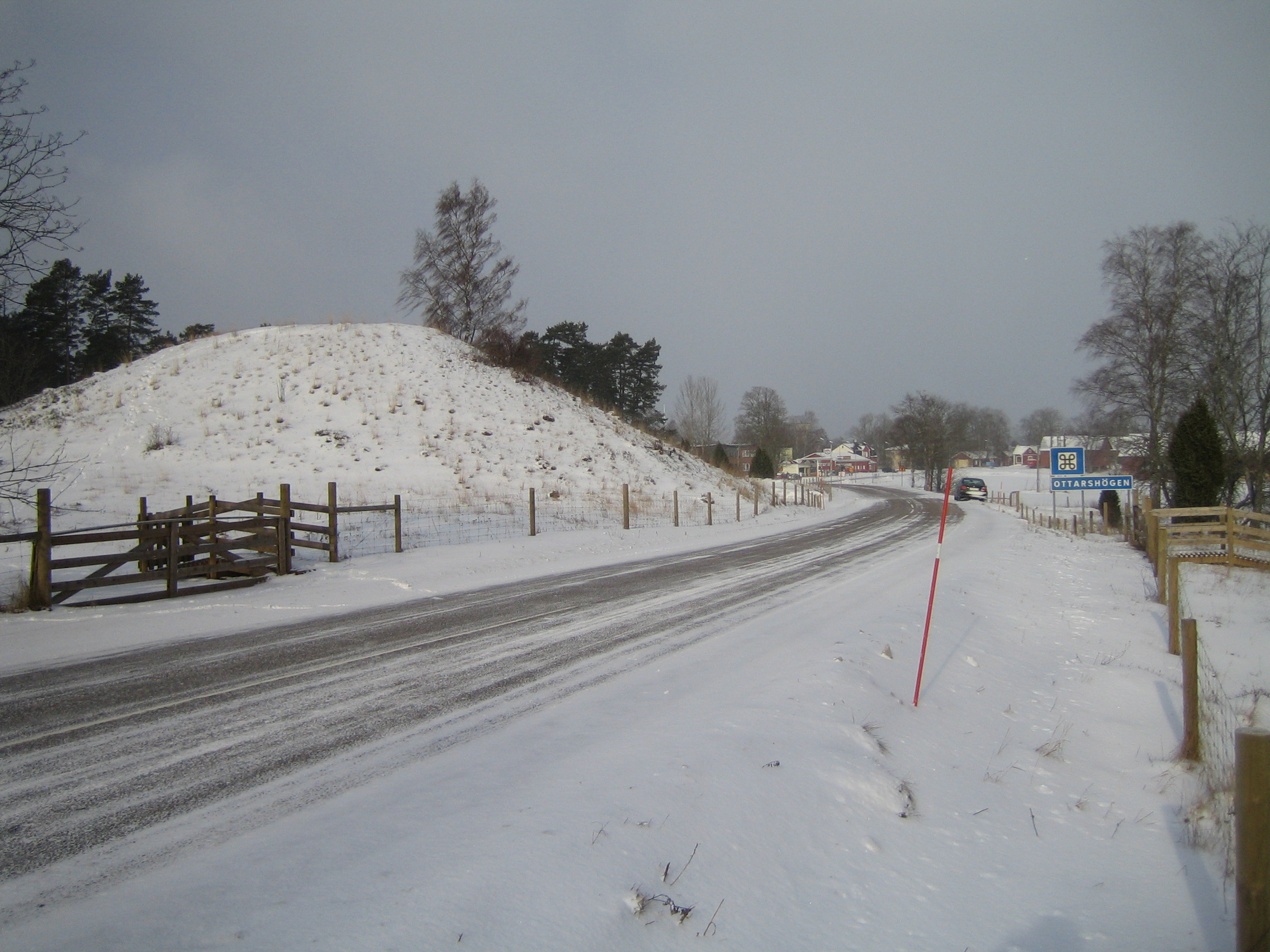
Ohthere's Mound located at Vendel parish, Uppland, Sweden.

Ohthere, also Ohtere (Old Norse: Óttarr vendilkráka, Vendelcrow; in modern Swedish Ottar Vendelkråka), was a semi-legendary king of Sweden of the house of Scylfings, who is said to have lived during the Germanic Heroic Age, possibly during the early 6th century (fl. c. 515 – c. 530).

His name can be reconstructed as Proto-Norse *Ōhta-harjaz or *Ōhtu-harjaz. The harjaz element is common in Germanic names and has a meaning of "warrior, army" (whence English harry); by contrast, the oht element is less frequent, and has been tentatively interpreted as "fearsome, feared".

A prince of the Swedes, Ohthere and his brother Onela conducted successful raids against the Geats after King Hrethel had died. In 515, their father Ongentheow was killed in battle by the Geats, and Ohthere succeeded his father as the king of Sweden. Ohthere led an army against the Geats, and besieged one of their armies. He nearly killed the Geatish king Hygelac but lost many of his forces in the conflict. Ohthere managed to get back to Sweden. In the 520s, Ohthere led a large raid to Denmark and plundered the Danish coast. A Danish army led by two Jarls, however, was waiting for him. Battle broke out. The Danish were reinforced, and Ohthere was killed in the battle. His corpse was taken back to Sweden and buried in an earthwork mound.

== Beowulf ==
In the Old English poem Beowulf, the name of Ohthere appears only in constructions referring to his father Ongenþeow (fæder Ohtheres), mother (Onelan modor and Ohtheres), and his sons Eadgils (suna Ohteres, sunu Ohteres) and Eanmund (suna Ohteres).

When Ohthere and his actions are concerned, he is referred to as Ongenþeow's offspring, together with his brother Onela. The following section deals with Ohthere and Onela pillaging the Geats at the death of their king Hreðel, restarting the Swedish-Geatish wars. Lines 2472–2478:

Þa wæs synn and sacu · Swēona ond Ġēata,
ofer wīd wæter · wrōht ġemǣne,
herenīð hearda, · syððan Hrēðel swealt,
oð ðe him Ongenðeowes · eaferan wǣran
frome fyrdhwate, · frēode ne woldon
ofer heafo healdan, ac ymb Hrēosna Beorh
eatolne inwitscear · oft ġefremedon.

Translation:

There was strife and struggle 'twixt Swede and Geat
o'er the width of waters; war arose,
hard battle-horror, when Hrethel died,
and Ongentheow's offspring grew
strife-keen, bold, nor brooked o'er the seas;
pact of peace, but pushed their hosts
to harass in hatred by Hreosnabeorh.

Later, it is implied in the poem that Ohthere has died, because his brother Onela is king. Ohthere's sons Eadgils and Eanmund fled to the Geats and the wars began anew.

Family tree of the Scyldings (Kings of the Danes), Heathobards and Scylfings (Kings of the Swedes), according to Beowulf

♕ Heremod
♕ Scyld Scefing
♕ Beowulf
♕ Healfdene	♕ Ongentheow
♕ Heorogar	♕ Hrothgar	Wealhtheow	Halga	A daughter	♕ Onela	♕ Ohthere
Heoroweard	Hrethric	Hrothmund	Hrothulf	Froda	Eanmund	Eadgils
Freawaru	Ingeld

== Scandinavian sources ==
Ynglingatal, Ynglinga saga, Íslendingabók, and Historia Norvegiae all present Óttarr as the son of Egill (called Ongenþeow in Beowulf) and as the father of Aðísl/Aðils/athils/Adils (Eadgils).

=== Ynglingatal ===
The oldest Norse source is the 9th century genealogical poem Ynglingatal, preserved in citation in the 13th century Ynglinga saga. Ynglingatal, stanza 15, mentions only that Óttarr was killed by the Danish jarls Vǫttr and Fasti in a place named Vendill:

Fell Óttarr
und ara greipar
dugandligr
fyr Dana vôpnum.
Þann hergammr
hrægum fœti
víðs borinn
á Vendli sparn.
Þau frák verk
Vǫtts ok Fasta
sœnskri þjóð
at sǫgum verða,
at eylands
jarlar Fróða
vígfrǫmuð
of veginn hǫfðu.

‘The valiant Óttarr fell beneath the talons of the eagle before the weapons of the Danes. The battle-vulture [RAVEN/EAGLE], come from afar, trod him with flesh-hung foot at Vendill. I have learned that these deeds of Vǫttr and Fasti became legends for the Swedish people, that the jarls of Fróði from the island had killed the inciter of war [WARRIOR].’

=== Historia Norwegiæ ===
The 12th century Historia Norwegiæ presents a Latin summary of Ynglingatal, older than Snorri's quotation (continuing after Egil):

Cui successit in regnum filius suus Ottarus, qui a suo æquivoco Ottaro Danorum comite et fratre ejus Fasta in una provinciarum Daniæ, scilicet Wendli, interemptus est. Cujus filius Adils [...]

The successor to the throne was his son Ottar, who was assassinated in Vendel, a law province of Denmark, by his namesake, a Danish jarl, and this man's brother, Fasta. His son Adils [...]

Historia Norvegiæ informs us only that Óttarr was killed by the Danish brothers Ottar (his namesake) and Faste in a Danish province called Vendel.

=== Ynglinga saga ===
According to the youngest but most elaborate source, Snorri's 13th century Ynglinga saga, Óttarr refused to pay tribute to the Danish king Fróði for the help that his father had received. When Fróði sent two men to collect the tribute, Óttarr answered that the Swedes had never paid tribute to the Danes and would not begin with him. Fróði gathered a vast host and raided in Sweden, but the next summer he pillaged in the east. When Óttarr learnt that Fróði was gone, he sailed to Denmark to plunder in return and went into the Limfjord where he pillaged in Vendsyssel. Fróði's jarls Vott and Faste attacked Óttarr in the fjord. The battle was even and many men fell, but the Danes were reinforced by local farmers and so the Swedes lost (a version apparently borrowed from the death of Óttarr's predecessor Jorund). The Danes put Óttarr's corpse on a mound to be devoured by wild beasts, and made a wooden crow that they sent to Sweden, with the message that the wooden crow was all that Óttarr was worth. After this, Óttarr was called Vendelcrow (Old Norse: Vendilkráka).

It is only Snorri who uses the epithet Vendelcrow for Óttarr, whereas the older sources Historia Norvegiae and Íslendingabók instead use it for his father Egill. Moreover, only Snorri's work tells the story of Óttarr's death in Vendsyssel, and it is probably his own invention.

== Ohthere's Barrow ==
Ohthere's barrow (Swedish: Ottarshögen) (60°08′N 17°34′E) is located in Vendel parish, Uppland, Sweden. The barrow is 5 metres high and 40 metres wide. In the 17th century, the barrow was known locally as Ottarshögen. The term Hög is derived from the Old Norse word haugr, meaning mound or barrow.

The barrow was excavated in the period 1914–16. It showed the remains of both a man and a woman, and the finds were worthy of a king. The Swedish archaeologist Sune Lindqvist reported that in its centre, there was a wooden vessel with ashes. There were few finds but they were well-preserved. There were some decorative panels similar to those found in the other Vendel era graves nearby. A comb with a case was found, as well as a golden Roman coin, a solidus, dated to be no later than 477. It had been perforated and was probably used as decoration, but it showed signs of wear and tear and had probably been worn for a longer time. Lindqvist stated that the identification of the barrow as that of Ohthere could not receive more archaeological confirmation than those provided by the excavation.

== See also ==
- Óttar of Dublin

== Notes ==
Ohthere House of Yngling
Preceded by Ongenþeow	Legendary king of Sweden	Succeeded by Onela or Eadgils
