= Wægmunding =

Swedish clan

The Wægmundings were a prominent probably Swedish clan (an ätt, see Norse clans) in Beowulf. A name such as Wægmunding meant "belongs to Wægmund", i.e. they were the descendants of a man named Wægmund. This was the normal way of naming a Germanic clan (e.g. Sigurd the Völsung, descendant of king Völsung, Folkung [descendants of Folke] and Yngling [descendants of Yngvi-Freyr]).

Members:

- Wægmund (the ancestor of the clan)
- Ælfhere (seems to have been a distinguished member of the clan as Wiglaf is described as his kinsman)
- Ecgþeow (joined the Danes and the Geats as he was banished for slaying a man from another clan)
- Beowulf (son of Ecgþeow and the hero of the epic by his name)
- Weohstan (Swedish champion and slayer of his fugitive countryman prince Eanmund)
- Wiglaf (the last of the Wægmundings and son of Weohstan. He fought with Beowulf against the dragon)

The story of this clan in Beowulf is that Ecgþeow slew a man, Heaðolaf, from another clan, the Wulfings (probably the rulers of the less known East Geats). As the Wægmundings would not or could not pay the expected wergild, Ecgtheow was banished and sought refuge among the Danes. The Danish king Hrothgar paid the wergild and had Ecgþeow swear an oath. Later, Ecgþeow served the Geats and distinguished himself enough to marry the Geatish king Hreðel's daughter, with whom he had the son Beowulf.

During the Swedish-Geatish wars, Ecgþeow's close relative, Weohstan, fought on the Swedish side for Onela, and killed Onela's nephew Eanmund. The fact that these characters are described as Wægmundings explains why the Swedish warrior Wiglaf became the companion of Beowulf although his father had fought against the Geats. Since Ecgþeow, Beowulf's father, was a close relative of Weohstan, Wiglaf's father, it is not surprising that Wiglaf (after his father's death) joined his relative Beowulf in Geatland, and that Beowulf assumed responsibility for the young Swede.

== On the ethnic identity of the Wægmundings ==
In the epic we learn that Wiglaf was a Scylfing which literally refers to the ruling family of Sweden, and defines Wiglaf as a Swede. We also learn that Wiglaf's father, Weohstan, was a Wægmunding and fought on the Swedish side. Concerning Beowulf's father the text tells us that he was a Wægmunding and that he was banished for killing the man of a different family, the Wulfings. This was standard procedure if the perpetrators family could not pay the wergild at the Ting. Since no other ethnic label is given for the Wægmundings, this makes a Swedish ethnicity the most likely one. This means that Beowulf was fighting his own kinsmen, on his father's side, when fighting the Swedes. According to researcher Gudmund Schütte, Wægmunding could be related to a Finnish mythological character, Väinämöinen.
