= Heaðolaf =

Heaðolaf (Proto-Norse *Haþulaibaz) was a member of a Scandinavian clan named the Wulfings, which according to the Germanic heroic legend of Beowulf ruled the Geatish petty kingdom of Östergötland.

All that is known of Heaðolaf is that he was slain by Ecgþeow, the father of Beowulf. Reportedly, his powerful family demanded too high a weregild from Ecgþeow's clan, the Wægmundings, so Ecgþeow was banished and had to seek refuge with the Danes. The Danish king Hroðgar paid the weregild and the matter was settled.
