= Modthryth =

Mention of Thryth (Þryðo) in Beowulf

Modthryth, Thryth ('strength', cf. Old Norse Þrúðr, the daughter of Thor), and Fremu are reconstructed names for a character who figures as the queen of King Offa in Beowulf.

== Naming problem: Modthryth, Thryth, or Fremu? ==
The reason for the usage of both Thryth and the compound name Modthryth is that the latter name is an emendation by Klaeber (1953). Mod appears just before Þryð on line 1932 of the poem, where she is introduced, and scholars are divided as to whether mod is part of her name, or a separate word.

The queen of the eighth-century Mercian king Offa in the thirteenth-century Vitae duorum Offarum, which portrays both this Offa and his fifth-century namesake, is called Quendrida, a somewhat flawed Latin rendering of Cynethryth, the actual name of Offa's wife. The author, moreover, etymologised the word as consisting of the words quen 'queen' and the personal name Drida: Quendrida, id est regina Drida. This parallel has sometimes been taken as a further argument that the Offa of Beowulf had a queen called Thryth and that the passage was intended as a veiled reference to the eighth-century queen.

More recently, R. D. Fulk has challenged the long-held view that the queen was named either Modthryth or Thryth, pointing out difficulties with the ending -o, its implications for the overall syntax, and the weaknesses of the Drida argument. Instead, he revives the suggestion made by Ernst A. Kock in 1920 that fremu is not an adjective modifying folces cwen "the people's princess" and meaning "excellent" (which would be inappropriate at this stage of the narrative), but her actual name. On the basis of such parallels as higeþryðe wæg "bore arrogance" (Old English Genesis A line 2240b), he likewise treats Mod þryðo as a common noun, although this necessitates an emendation of the ending -o to -a. Eric Weiskott has challenged Fulk's reinterpretation on grounds of poetic syntax, concluding that the queen remains anonymous.

The name Thryth may also have been paraphrased in Saxo Grammaticus' portrait of the war-like maiden-queen of Schotland, Herminthrud, who is courted by Amleth (History of the Danes, Book IV), as well as by the name of the shield-maiden Drot(a), bride of king Borcar of Scania (Book VII).

== From wicked princess to virtuous queen ==
The relevant passage immediately follows, almost interrupts, a favourable description of Hygelac's queen Hygd. First, the portrayal focuses on the princess's character in her early days before her marriage to Offa. She is a powerful and vengeful woman who punishes any man beneath her station who dares to look her directly in the eye:

Old English text (lines 1931b-1943) [...] Mod Þryðo wæg, fremu folces cwen, firen ondrysne. Nænig þæt dorste deor geneþan swæsra gesiða, nefne sinfrea, þæt hire an dæges eagum starede; ac him wælbende weotode tealde, handgewriþene; hraþe seoþðan wæs æfter mundgripe mece geþinged, þæt hit sceadenmæl scyran moste, cwealmbealu cyðan. Ne bið swylc cwenlic þeaw idese to efnanne, þeah ðe hio ænlicu sy, þætte freoðuwebbe feores onsæce æfter ligetorne leofne mannan.	Translation by Michael Swanton (p. 127) [...] "Thryth, imperious queen of the nation, showed haugtiness, a terrible sin. There was no brave man among the dear companions, save for her overlord, who by day dared venture to gaze at her with his eyes; but he might reckon deadly fetters, twisted by hand, assured for him; that after seizure, the sword would be prescribed, the patterned blade should settle it, make known a violent death. Such a thing is no queenly custom for a lady to practise, peerless though she may be – that a 'peace-weaver' should take the life of a beloved man on account of a fancied insult."	Loose translation by R.D. Fulk (first lines, p. 628) [...] It was with arrogance that Fremu, a princess of the people, acted, with terrible wickedness; there was none so bold among her own companions, save her great lord, that he dared venture to lay eyes on her by day.

She changes her ways after being married to Offa, becoming a great queen and gaining fame for her good deeds:

Old English text (lines 1944–1962) Huru þæt onhohsnode Hemminges mæg. Ealodrincende oðer sædan, þæt hio leodbealewa læs gefremede, inwitniða, syððan ærest wearð gyfen goldhroden geongum cempan, æðelum diore, syððan hio Offan flet ofer fealone flod be fæder lare siðe gesohte. Đær hio syððan well in gumstole, gode mære, lifgesceafta lifigende breac, hiold heahlufan wið hæleþa brego, ealles moncynnes mine gefræge þone selestan bi sæm tweonum, eormencynnes. Forðam Offa wæs geofum ond guðum, garcene man wide geweorðod; wisdome heold eðel sinne. Þonon Eomer woc hæleðum to helpe, Hemminges mæg, nefa Garmundes, niða cræftig.	Translation by Michael Swanton (pp. 127–9) "However, Hemming's kinsman put a stop to that. Those drinking ale told another tale – that she brought about fewer acts of malice, injuries to the people, as soon as she was given, adorned with gold, to the young champion, the dear prince, when at her father's bidding she sought out Offa's hall in a journey across the yellowish flood. There she subsequently occupied the throne well, famous for virtue, while living made good use of the life destined for her, maintained a profound love for the chief of heroes – the best, as I have heard, of all mankind, of the entire race between the seas. Indeed, Offa, a spear-bold man, was widely honoured for gifts and battles; he held his homeland with wisdom. Thence sprang Eomer, to be a help to the heroes – a kinsman of Hemming, grandson of Garmund, skilful in conflicts."

The poet juxtaposes the vice of the queen with the virtues of Hygd (introduced a few lines prior in l. 1926), not only condemning Modthryth's behavior but reinforcing the idea that it is the role of a queen to be a freoðuwebbe or peace-weaver (lines 1940–1944).

Based on the similarity of name, the portrayal of 'Thryth' has been interpreted as an attack upon Offa of Mercia's wife Cynethryth.

== Alternate Readings of Modthryth ==
While scholars such as R. D. Fulk read Modthryth in terms of the limiting tamed virago motif, it has been suggested that this reflects preconceptions among scholars. Erin Sebo and Cassandra Schilling point out that many of the negative attitudes to her are based on phrases that are unclear or seem to be the result of scribal error. They note that the Beowulf Poet introduces Modthryth by stressing "the importance of her role in the prosperity of the community, describing her as “fremu folces cwen” (1932a), a “good queen of the people”." Helen Damico sees Modthryth as encompassing both the threatening and benevolent aspects of the Wælcyrge: she "parallels the evolution of the archetypal figure that Modthrytho is modelled upon, the progression of fierce war-demon to gold-adorned warrior-queen". Mary Dockray-Miller argues that she is "neither a reformed peace pledge, nor a heroic Valkyrie. Instead, her character both confirms and denies a masculine economy that depends on women as commodities [thus] Modþryðo's masculine performance manages to subvert the usual use of women as objects in exchanges between men". Another feminist scholar, Pat Belanoff, comments upon the Old English tradition of strong female characters and images, positing that "[w]ithin the resources available to Anglo-Saxon poets was a traditional image of the female: an intelligent strong minded, usually glowing or shining, verbally adept woman whose actions are resolute and self-initiated". Considering that the poem itself includes similar descriptions of Modthryth, stating that she is "famous for her good deeds and conduct in life" certain ignored possibilities for this character are being explored. Even early scholars, such as Bonjour, note that, while many characters in the poem fall from greatness, she is the only one who changes her negative traits to become great.

Taking such criticism into account, it is apparent that complexities hitherto denied to Modthryth are being explored through the revision of feminist scholars -thus uncovering nuances of gendered power that are implicit within the poem. With this in mind, Modthryth no longer acts solely as a foil to the good queen Hygd, but contributes to a tradition of strong female figures. Evidently, it would be profitable to view Modthryth as comparable to such figures as Judith or even the Old Norse Valkyrie-brides.

== See also ==
- Beowulf: Hygd, Wealhþeow, Freawaru, Hildeburh
- Beowulf: Grendel's mother
- Eadburh, daughter of King Offa of Mercia and wife to King Beorhtric of Wessex
- Book of Judith
- Valkyrie

== Primary sources ==
- Beowulf, ed. and tr. Michael Swanton, Beowulf. 2nd ed. New York, 1997. Swanton's prose translation is re-arranged as verse-lines above.
- Beowulf. Trans. Fulk, R. D. Ed. Fulk. The Beowulf Manuscript: Complete Texts and the Fight at Finnsburg. Cambridge and London: Harvard UP, 2010. Print.
- Beowulf: A Verse Translation. Trans. Heaney, Seamus. New York: W. W. Norton & Company, 2002. Print.
