= Wiglaf =

Character in the Old English poem Beowulf

Wiglaf (Proto-Norse: *Wīgalaibaz, meaning "battle remainder"; Old English: Wīġlāf [ˈwiːjlɑːf]) is a character in the Anglo-Saxon epic poem Beowulf. He is the son of Weohstan, a Swede of the Wægmunding clan who had entered the service of Beowulf, king of the Geats. Wiglaf is called Scylfing as a metonym for Swede, as the Scylfings were the ruling Swedish clan. While in the service of the Scylfing Onela, king of the Swedes, Weohstan killed the rebel prince Eanmund and took his sword as a trophy; (Note: Lines 2612-2615.) Wiglaf later inherited it. (Note: Lines 2620-2624.) Weohstan belonged to the clan of the Wægmundings, the same clan Beowulf's father Ecgþeow belonged to; so Wiglaf is Beowulf's distant cousin, and his only living relative at the time of Beowulf's death.

Scholars have proposed various interpretations of Wiglaf's role in the poem, but agree that he is important, and that he was Beowulf's nephew, a key relationship in heroic tales of the period.

Wiglaf has a counterpart in Scandinavian sources named Hjalti who serves as a side-kick to Beowulf's counterpart Bödvar Bjarki, and in Bjarkamál, Hjalti makes speeches comparable to those made by Wiglaf in Beowulf.

== Beowulf ==
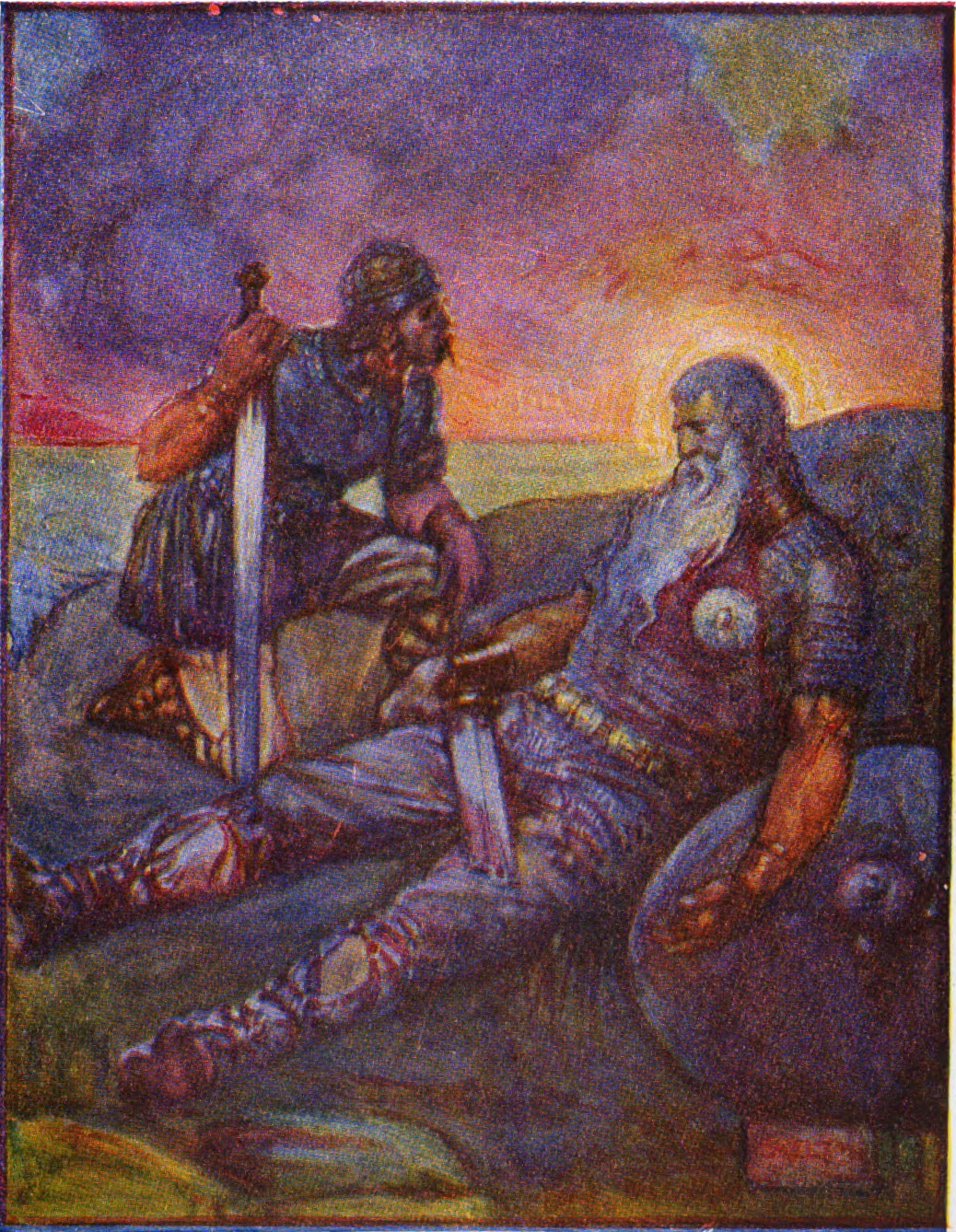
Wiglaf speaking to the mortally wounded Beowulf after their battle with the dragon. 1908 illustration by J. R. Skelton

Wiglaf first appears in Beowulf at line 2602, as a member of the band of thanes who go with Beowulf to seek out the dragon that has attacked Geat-Land. This is the first time Wiglaf has gone to war at Beowulf's side. (Note: Lines 2625b-2627.) He is called a "praise-worthy shield-warrior", a "prince of the Scylfings", and mæg ælfheres, "kinsman of Ælfhere." (Note: Lines 2603-2604.)

When Beowulf damages his sword wounding the dragon and is burned by the dragon's fire, (Note: Lines 2585-2595.) Wiglaf is the only man of Beowulf's band to overcome his fear of the dragon. (Note: Lines 2599-2600.) He rebukes the other thanes (Note: Lines 2631-2660.) and goes to Beowulf's aid (Note: Line 2661.) crying words of encouragement. (Note: Lines 2663-2668.)

Wiglaf does not retreat, though his shield is consumed by fire. (Note: Lines 2675-2677.) When Beowulf wounds the dragon a second time, striking so hard his sword shatters, (Note: Lines 2677-2682.) Wiglaf strikes at the open wound with his own sword, tearing at the dragon's throat so it can no longer breathe fire. (Note: Lines 2699-2702.) His hand is badly burned, (Note: Lines 2697-2698.) but his attack allows Beowulf to close and kill the dragon. The poet says of Wiglaf, "So should a man be, a thane at need!" (Note: Lines 2708-2709.)

At Beowulf's command, Wiglaf gathers treasure from the dragon's lair and piles it where Beowulf can see it. (Note: Lines 2752-2782.) The dying Beowulf tells Wiglaf to "watch his people's needs" (Note: Lines 2799-2800.) (by which he means that Wiglaf is to become the next king.) He tells Wiglaf to build him a funeral mound (Note: Lines 2802-2808.) and gives Wiglaf his rings, helm, and mail-shirt. (Note: Lines 2809-2812.) He says that Wiglaf is now "the last of the Wægmundings." (Note: Lines 2813-2814.)

The other eleven men that came with Beowulf (Note: He took eleven thanes (line 2401) plus the man who knew where the dragon's lair was (line 2406) for a total of thirteen men, counting Beowulf.) gather around the body, and Wiglaf condemns them for their failure of duty and declares that he will order them exiled. (Note: Lines 2864-2891.) He sends a messenger to tell the other Geats what has happened. (Note: Line 2892.) When the Geats have gathered, Wiglaf addresses them, mourning Beowulf's death and expressing dismay at the bleak future of the Geats without Beowulf to guard them. (Note: Lines 3077-3109.)

Wiglaf's last appearance is at line 3120, where he chooses seven thanes to help him push the dragon's corpse over the cliff into the sea, loot the lair, and lay the treasure on Beowulf's funeral pyre. (Note: Lines 3120-3136.)

== Significance ==
=== Flees, and turns back ===
R. R. Lumiansky notes that while a common interpretation is that Wiglaf is the only one of Beowulf's companions who does not flee, Wiglaf actually flees along with the cowardly companions, as he must be far away from the fight when he addresses the cowards. In this interpretation, Wiglaf then remembers his duty of kinship and the bravery of his father Weohstan. This brings a feeling of remorse, and he tries without success to persuade the companions; he returns to the fight alone. He then feels moved to encourage Beowulf, an action that could be seen as surprising from a youth facing his first fight to a heroic King, and at last to join the fight against the dragon.

=== A Wægmunding, Beowulf's nephew ===
Norman E. Eliason notes that Wiglaf is a member of the Waegmundings, a Swedish clan. In his view, this is "of crucial significance". As he dies, Beowulf gives Wiglaf his armour and torque, which Eliason glosses as "very likely a royal emblem he had worn about his neck", noting that if he had had a son, he would have given this emblem to him. However, the poet, at this crucial moment, leaves the relationship between the two men vague, rather than doing the conventional thing in heroic verse of making it an uncle-nephew relationship, as scholars like Larry Benson have assumed, and like that of Beowulf and Hygelac. Eliason however disagrees with the widespread scholarly interpretation that Beowulf, too, was a Waegmunding, finding the suggestion that he was half-Swedish "unthinkable or even ridiculous". But, he writes, the poet "makes it clear that as a Geat Beowulf had to take vengeance on Onela and that as a Waegmunding he was entitled to Onela's favour". This leads Eliason to suggest that Beowulf's sister married Weohstan the Waegmunding, so Wiglaf is Beowulf's nephew after all.

=== Allegory ===
Richard North revisits the old hypothesis that the Beowulf Wiglaf, and indeed the whole poem, was commissioned by the historical King Wiglaf of Mercia as a memorial to King Beornwulf, at the same time presenting himself as successor; he had been an ealdorman, not the King's son, so the succession could have been in doubt. He notes the resemblance of the names (Beornwulf, Wiglaf) to the heroes in the poem, claiming that Wiglaf cannot be traced to any Scandinavian source.

The scholar Kevin Kiernan likens the survival of the Beowulf manuscript to Wiglaf's survival of the last fight of Beowulf the hero, noting however that while Wiglaf's efforts were all in vain, the manuscript somehow limped on.

=== Etymology ===
Wiglaf's name appears to be an example of etymological refraction. The name is composed of two Old English elements, namely wig (fight, battle, war) and laf (what or who is left). When Wiglaf first enters battle alongside his lord, the poem is structured to reflect greater significance on his name. The separation and reversal of the elements of the name in the manuscript suggest that the name "Wiglaf" signifies "the inheritor of strength" or "one that is fulfilled through battle", according to the scholars Patrick J. Gallacher and Helen Damico.

An alternate understanding of the name in the context of a typical dithematic name, where the two elements may be as independent in meaning as separate names, "laf" could be read as "one who remains, one who survives or endures". Gallacher and Damico have acknowledged this alternative interpretation but feel that it is unnecessary to argue that one discernible element within a name submerges another as all interpretations are collectively useful in the pursuit of deep analysis.

== Cultural references ==
In the 1981 animated film Grendel Grendel Grendel, Wiglaf (voiced by Ernie Bourne) is portrayed as one of Hrothgar's thanes rather than an ally of Beowulf, and is killed by Grendel.

In the 2007 film Beowulf (directed by Robert Zemeckis), Wiglaf's role (played by Brendan Gleeson) is larger; he is present in the film from the first introduction of Beowulf and the Geats to the end when Beowulf vanquishes the dragon and dies. The film makes Wiglaf into a sidekick, the second-in-command and the best friend of the epic hero.

Legendary titles
Preceded by Beowulf	King of the Geats	Unknown

== See also ==
- The Wanderer
