= Breca the Bronding =

Character in Beowulf

Breca (sometimes spelled Breoca or Brecca) was a Bronding who, according to the Old English poem Beowulf, was Beowulf's opponent in a swimming or rowing match when the two were young.

While dining, Unferth alludes to the story of their contest as a reproach to Beowulf's impulsiveness and foolhardiness, and Beowulf then relates it in detail, explaining how he needed to stop and defeat multiple sea monsters (nicors) during the match, so, although he arrived at the goal after Breca, his was the more worthy journey.

In line 522 of Beowulf, Breca is identified as lond Brondinga ("of the Brondings' land"). Breca is also mentioned in Widsith, an Anglo-Saxon poem (also known, usually by the translations of Benjamin Thorpe, as The Skôp, or The Gleema's Tale, or The Skald's Tale) known only from a 10th-century copy, as the ruler (in some unspecified previous century) of the Brondings (line 25 of Widsith):

Cassere weold Creacum, ond Caelic Finnum, ... Caesar rules the Greeks, and Caelic the Finns, ...
Meaca Myrgingum, Mearchealf Hundingum, Meaca the Myrinings, Marchalf the Hundings,
þeodric weold Froncum, þyle Rondingum, Theodoric ruled the Franks, Thyle the Rondings,
Breoca Brondingum, Billing Wernum, ..... Breca the Brondings, Billing the Wernas, .....

This is presumably the same Breca as mentioned in Beowulf. In Beowulf, Breca is further identified, in line 524, as sunu Bēanstānes ("Beanstan's son"), as if the name Breca and the mention of Beanstan would be familiar enough to Unferth's audience to adequately identify him (although Beanstan is not otherwise mentioned in any surviving document).

It was long ago theorized that the Brondings and Breca lived on the island of Brännö outside of modern Gothenburg (the second largest city in Sweden). On the other hand, from the mention in Widsith, with the Brondings mentioned immediately before the Wernas (and the Wernas supposedly being the Varini on the Elbe), it has been suggested that the Brondings might have located near them, perhaps in Mecklenburg or Pomerania. It has even been suggested that the Brondings, whose name suggests the crashing of waves, are entirely mythical.

== The nature of the contest ==
Some scholars have debated whether Beowulf and Breca competed in a swimming match or a rowing match. Ambiguities in the translation of Beowulf have left scholars with multiple interpretations for the Beowulf-Breca "swimming" episode. Karl P. Wentersdorf of Xavier University writes, "An adventure in which two youths spend seven days and nights swimming at sea is more than extraordinary, particularly since they are carrying heavy iron swords and wearing cumbersome coats of chain mail." Such a remarkable feat would not, however, be very incongruous with the poem's other portrayals of Beowulf's heroic prowess. Unferth describes this as a foolhardy contest or race, but when Beowulf offers his own version of events, it becomes a youthful confidence-building or team-building shared challenge, much like a camping or mountaineering trip, in which the two participants endeavored to stay together rather than one leave the other far behind.

According to Wentersdorf, the trouble with translation "results from the ambiguity of the word sund in the lines ymb sund flite (line 508) and he þeaet sunde oferflat (lines 517-518)." Sund, though often translated by scholars as "swim" could, through evolution of language, be interpreted as "rowing". Beowulf and Breca could have been rowing together or competing to see who was the more prodigious rower. The Old English term rēon, used twice in this portion of Beowulf (namely lines 513 and 540), is not translated as "swim" in any other Anglo-Saxon poetry. The kennings earmum þehton (line 514, þeccean "to cover, conceal") and mundum brugdon (line 515a, bregdan "to pull, move quickly, swing, draw"), used by Unferth to describe Beowulf's match against Breca, are applicable to both swimming and rowing. Twice in this portion (lines 514 and 540) that sund is used is in the same lines as rēon, and both times forming the three-word phrase on sund rēon, which would seem to mean "rowing on the sea" – but there is an Anglo-Saxon word, onsund, which means "sound, physically strong, uninjured", in most transcriptions of the Beowulf text it does not occur, but in the original manuscript, at line 513 on and sund have apparently been rewritten after being scraped from the parchment and seem slightly closer together than two separate words ordinarily are (although Zupitza's transcription treats them as two separate words), and in line 540 the manuscript clearly uses onsund as a single word and Zupitza transcribes it as a single word – although he drew a thin line of separation after on, which may indicate that he did not know that onsund was a word with a meaning of its own. Onsund is found in a lot of other Anglo-Saxon artifacts. In Icelandic, at least, sund requires a preposition, not found here in Beowulf, to mean swimming rather than merely something aquatic.

Unferth also uses the phrases wada cunnedon (line 509), "made trial of the waters", and glidon ofer garsecg (line 515), "glided over the sea" during his description of Beowulf's match against Breca. Both terms are equally applicable to swimming and rowing. Rowing was, as much as swimming or water-wrestling, an essential skill for warriors during the Anglo-Saxon era, so a rowing competition between Beowulf and Breca would not have been out of the question. Although there are Nordic tales of swimming competitions, no other has characteristics of such extreme duration and danger as this – which, strictly speaking, was not a race but merely a testing of their own strength. Moreover, the duration of the challenge seems to make rowing more likely than swimming; seven days and nights immersed in Scandinavian waters, in winter no less (line 516), evidently without food nor an opportunity to go ashore for sleep or warmth, seems lethal (and certainly more arduous than Diana Nyad's five attempts – only the last one successful – to swim from Cuba to Miami, each effort lasting only 2½ days).

Additionally, the text refers to Beowulf as fleotan (line 543) – "floating", and being on sidne sæ (line 508), and on deóp wæter (line 510) – "upon the wide sea" and "upon the deep water" and similar expressions—putting him consistently atop or above the water, rather than in or under the water. In line 515, he is described as having glidon ofer garsecg – "glided over / above the surf"; again, an image more in keeping with rowing than swimming. Further, in line 581, fatigued from his struggles with the sea monsters, Beowulf was carried by the currents to the land of the Finns (presumably a great distance) – and here the original manuscript's text clearly reads wudu weallendu – wudu, a word related to "wood" and often meaning "boat" (or perhaps "raft"), as it does in lines 216, 298 and elsewhere, so that Beowulf was carried to the Finns on a tossing, quaking boat; however, several editors and translators saw an obscure difficulty (between the masculine wudu and the neuter weallendu) and insisted on changing the wudu ("boat") to wadu ("water"), making it appear that Beowulf was carried to the Finns on "surging water" (and, naturally, translators relying on the printed Anglo-Saxon text worked up by such editors were innocently led to the same result).

== Significance of the story ==
The story of the aquatic adventure with Breca is introduced into the Beowulf saga for a number of reasons. First, we are introduced to Unferth, evidently a significant member of Hrothgar's court, but we are immediately encouraged to dislike him, because we are told he is motivated by envy and wishes to embarrass Hrothgar's honored guest. Second, it enables the introduction of a separate story (coming before the confrontation with Grendel) attesting, after a fashion, to Beowulf's strength, courage, and resourcefulness. Third, it tells us that Beowulf has already overcome monsters other than Grendel – several of them – so that he is suited for the challenge he faces. When he tells his side of the story, Beowulf manages to include some rude rebuffs to Unferth (the mention of Unferth killing his kin may be nothing more than slanging, just as modern American patois uses an accusation of 'a particular form of incest'). Further in the saga, when Heriot is being attacked by Grendel's Mother, we shall see Unferth approach Beowulf in humility, offering his own family's heirloom sword.

== In popular culture ==
- Breca appears as a main character, portrayed by Gísli Örn Garðarsson, in Beowulf: Return to the Shieldlands, which depicts him and Beowulf as having become companions as adults after Beowulf saved Breca from a lynch mob.
