= Brondings =

Germanic tribe

The Brondings were a Germanic tribe. They and Breca the Bronding are mentioned in Beowulf (Th. 1047; B. 521.), as Beowulf's childhood friend, and in Widsith (Scóp Th. 51; Wíd. 25.), where Breca is the lord of the Brondings. They were probably the people of the Swedish island of Brännö, west of Gothenburg in the Kattegatt.

== See also ==
- List of Germanic tribes
- Germanic peoples

== Sources ==
- An Anglo-Saxon Dictionary
