= Unferth =

Character in Beowulf

"Beowulf replies haughtily to Hunferth" (1910) by John Henry F. Bacon

In the Old English epic poem Beowulf, Unferth or Hunferth is a thegn (a retainer, servant) of the Danish lord Hrothgar. He appears five times in the poem — four times by the name 'Hunferð' (at lines 499, 530, 1165 and 1488) and once by the appellation "the son of Eclaf" (at line 980). The name Unferth does not appear in any Old English manuscript outside of the Nowell Codex, which contains Beowulf, and the meaning of the name is disputed. Several scholarly theories about Unferth have been proposed.

== Etymology ==
Unferth's name can be understood in a number of ways. A common reading, by Morton W. Bloomfield is to see it as un + frith, "mar peace": similarly, J. R. R. Tolkien considered the name to mean Unpeace/Quarrel, or perhaps 'Unfriend'. However, Searle's Onomasticon Anglo-Saxonicum lists several mentions of medieval historic personages, such as bishops and archbishops, named Hunfrith. Another reading, by Fred C. Robinson, is to see it as un + ferth, "no wit".

Other scholars, such as R. D. Fulk, have suggested that Unferth's name should not be associated with frið (peace) but with ferhð, which translates as “soul, spirit, mind, and life.” Fulk writes that it is difficult to assign significance to names in Beowulf because some of the characters involved are historical figures. However, Fulk argues that this can be done in the case of Unferth because the name Un-ferth is not known to appear in history, or in any manuscript other than the Nowell Codex. But the Chronicon Ex Chronicis, a 12th-century history of England, variously attributed to Florence of Worcester ("Florentii Wigorniensis") or to John of Worcester, mentions an 8th-century bishop of Winton whose name in Latin is given as "Hunfridus" and "Hunfertho".

The first element of the name, un, appears exclusively as hun in the sole manuscript of Beowulf, yet the alliterative metre of the poem shows conclusively that when the poem was composed the name began with a vowel. Fred C. Robinson suggested that this h- was a Celtic scribal habit, indicating that u had a vocalic function by adding an unpronounced, diacritic letter h. Fulk argued, however, that this use of the letter h does not appear anywhere else in the Beowulf manuscript, and Leonard Neidorf concluded that a scribe substituted the element Hun- for Un- simply because Hun- was familiar to him as a name element where Un- was not.

In Old English, un usually functions as a negative prefix. However, in certain contexts the meaning must be interpreted as 'abnormally', rather than 'not' (cf. German Untiefe, un-depth, which may mean either an excessive or an insufficient depth, or Old English unhar, "very old"). This use of un could add new possibilities to the meaning of the name Unferth. Despite the vast amount of research that has gone into the etymology of Unferth's name, there can be no easy consensus about its meaning.

== Appearances in Beowulf ==
Unferth appears a total of five times in Beowulf.

=== Challenge of Beowulf (lines 499–558) ===
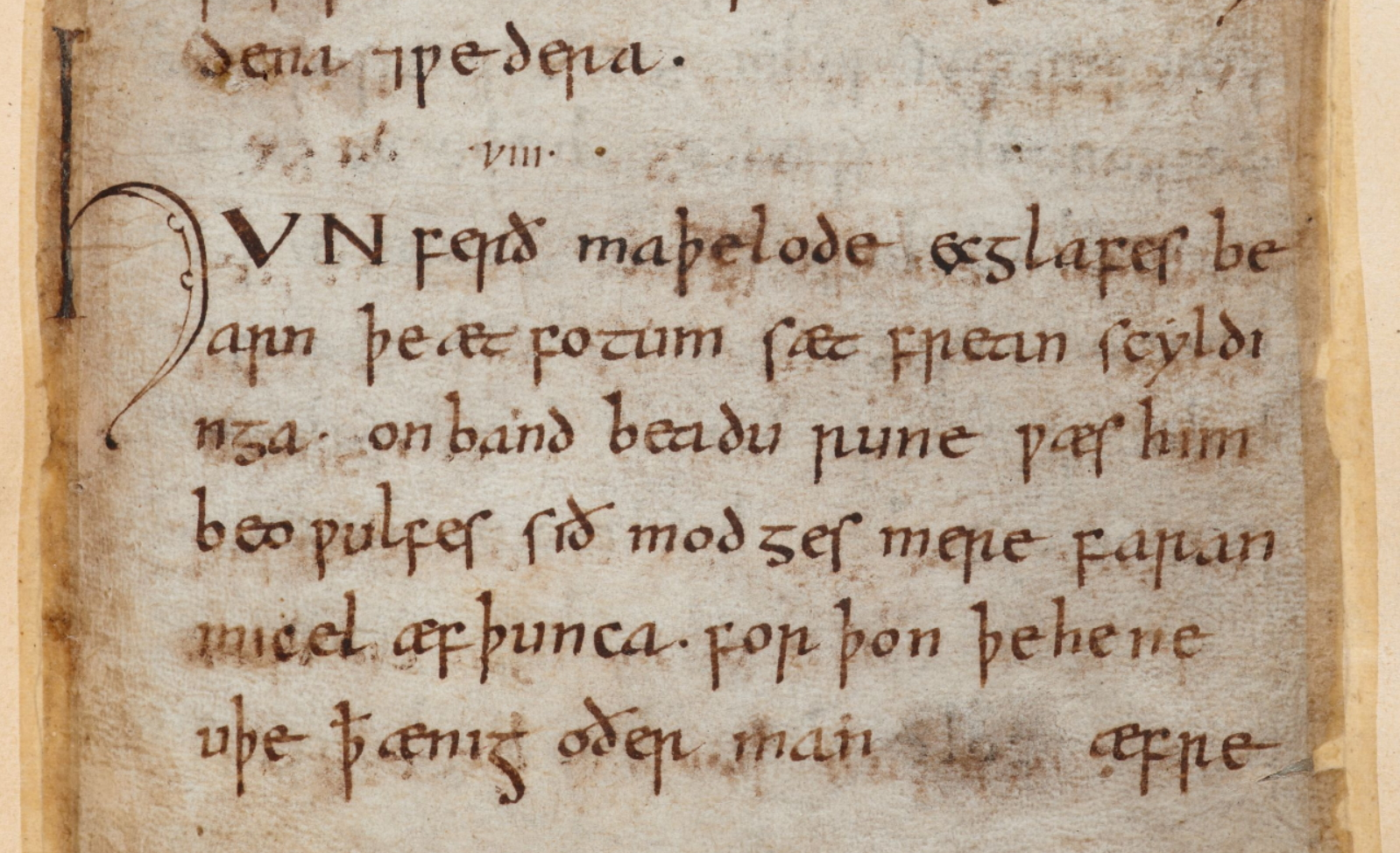
The first mention of Unferth in Beowulf

Unferth first appears at line 499:

Hunferð maþelode, Ecglafes bearn,
þe æt fotum sæt frean Scyldinga.

Unferth spoke, Ecglaf's son,
He who sat at the feet of the lord of the Scyldings.

The poet states that Unferth is envious of Beowulf's fame (since Beowulf has offered to defeat the monster Grendel, which Unferth has failed to do).

At line 506, Unferth impugns Beowulf, bringing up the story of Beowulf's swimming-contest with Breca the son of Beanstan. Unferth makes fun of the young Beowulf's foolish decision to have a swimming (or rowing) contest in the North Sea, ignoring all advice, and declares that he lost. He ends by predicting a bad result if Beowulf dares face Grendel.

Beowulf answers the challenge by boasting that he is the strongest swimmer in the world, and entertains the company with a tale about how, in that contest, he swam the North Sea in full armor while carrying a sword, killed nine huge sea-monsters who dragged him to the ocean floor, and was carried by the currents to the shore of the land of the Finns.

Beowulf says that he has never heard of anyone else having such a great sea-fight as he had; and then adds particularly that he has never heard such stories told of Unferth, and in fact the story people tell about Unferth is how he killed his brothers, for which, Beowulf predicts, Unferth will be tormented in Hell despite his cleverness. Unferth silently concedes defeat and the feast continues.

=== Change of heart (lines 980–984) ===
After Beowulf kills Grendel, Unferth seems to have a change of heart. When Beowulf hangs up Grendel's torn-off arm at the door of Heorot, the poet says that "no man was more silent than Ecglaf's son", and that he made no more boasting speeches.

=== The King's spokesman (lines 1165–1168) ===
At the celebratory feast after the killing of Grendel, the poet repeats that Unferth sat at the feet of the king, and calls him a þyle (also spelled ðyle) (pronounced thyle) (see Analysis below). The poet goes on to say that everyone knows of Unferth's courage and fealty, "though he did not show mercy to his kin in sword-play."

=== At the mere (lines 1455–1472) ===
When Grendel's mother attacks the hall, the Danes and Geats pursue her to the mere where she lives. As Beowulf arms himself to enter the mere, Unferth lends him his sword, Hrunting. Unferth is here referred to as a ðyle for the second and last time. The poet says that Unferth "did not bear in mind" his earlier challenging insults that he had spoken "when drunken", but acknowledged that Beowulf was "the better sword-fighter." The poet adds that Unferth "did not dare" to dive into the mere to attack Grendel's mother, and thus "his fame was lessened."

Beowulf is grateful for the loan, however, and at line 1488 he tells King Hroðgar that if he, Beowulf, does not return from the mere, then his own sword should be given to Unferth.

=== Parting (lines 1807–1812) ===
The morning after the celebratory feast on the occasion of Beowulf killing Grendel's mother, Beowulf and his people prepare to return to their home. Beowulf returns the sword Hrunting to Unferth, praising the weapon and its owner: he has "no ill word" for the sword (although it had not helped him against Grendel's mother), and he thanks Unferth for the loan. This is Unferth's last appearance in the poem.

== Analysis in Beowulf ==
Unferth's presence in the poem has been a point of much scholarly debate. He is called a þyle or ðyle – thyle (the word occurs only twice, once in line 1165 with þ and then in line 1456 with ð; it seems most scholarly articles use the þ) – a term related to Old Norse thul, a court orator, reciter, or jester. It is noticed that Unferth's brief remarks against Beowulf's youthful risk-taking is "a masterpiece of invective" and yet there is no reprimand for it, which suggests that it may have been part of Unferth's duties or practices to make a visitor defend his reputation. James L. Rosier, relying on Latin glosses in other Old English writings, interpreted the word to suggest something villainous or scurrilous. This was, however, rejected by Ida M. Hollowell, who theorizes that the Anglo-Saxon audience who immediately know what a thyle was and would even identify Unferth as such by his position at the feet of the king, and it is someone innocuous or even worthy of respect. She refers to another suggestion for the meaning of thyle- a pagan priest, making Unferth a priest of Woden confronted by a presumably Christian Beowulf. J.D.A. Ogilvy similarly speculates that Unferth's post at the feet of the king demonstrate that he was some sort of entertainer, and that he may have been a landless exile as a result of the misadventures with his kinsmen and given refuge by Hrothgar, as had been done with Ecgtheow (lines 459–472). Unferth only speaks once (an insult aimed at Beowulf), is described as intelligent and a kin-slayer, and is responsible for lending Beowulf his legendary, yet ill-fated sword, Hrunting. Kenneth Sisam argues that readers would be advised not to speculate beyond these basic facts as laid out by the poet. It should be kept in mind that, although the sword provided by Unferth was ineffective against Grendel's mother, we are told that this sword is an ancient treasure, "never had it failed", but although it had sliced through many a helmet, against Grendel's dam "this was the first time that the glorious treasure failed"; Unferth had no reason to foresee this failure, he gave his sword to Beowulf fully expecting it to be entirely successful. Another thought comes from Carroll Rich, who notes that the biblical tale of Cain and Abel is deeply woven into the poem, and as Unferth is a character who is notorious for slaying his own brother, a parallel might exist. Rich observes that "the depiction of Unferth as an envious fratricide makes clear the threat he poses to Beowulf and to a society dependent upon mutual trust." However, Norman E. Eliason suggests that the mention of Unferth's fratricide, although apparently reiterated in line 1167, is not to be taken seriously but is a mere bit of billingsgate. Eliason's theory is that Unferth is an admirable character, well-intentioned, despite the narrator's suggestions to the contrary.

== As social taunter ==
The social taunter has many roles, as has been stated by Thalia Phillies Feldman in her article, "The Taunter in Ancient Epic: The Iliad, Odyssey, Aeneid, and Beowulf". In a society of kings and warriors, the social taunter acts as the spokesman of the court, revealer of truths, means of social control, and provocateur. Unferth performs these functions, thus fulfilling the role of social taunter. He is able to do so mainly because of his characteristic fast tongue, unabashed speech and wit. The taunter, as opposed to a satirist, is able to make personal attacks on specific characters. He reveals a character's flaws and failures that other court members may not be aware of, or are too afraid to point out. Unferth does this as he questions the events that took place during the swimming contest. Because of Unferth's taunt, Beowulf has no choice (in fact it is part of his duty to defend his honour) but to correct Unferth's version of the story and to rectify himself once again. Unferth's taunt spurs Beowulf into action and reignites Hrothgar's and the people's faith in him. Their exchange also provides dramatic tension between the hero's arrival and the fight with Grendel.

== Modern influence ==
Unferth is also the anti-hero of John Gardner's novel, Grendel. Portrayed as a boastful but weak-willed warrior, Unferth is mocked by Grendel for false piety, hypocrisy, and failing to live up to the ideals of the heroic culture that Unferth claims to embrace. Late in the novel, Unferth is mocked publicly by Beowulf. In Gardner's adaptation of lines 580–607 of the epic, Beowulf responds to Unferth's verbal attacks by reminding all present that no one sings of Unferth's courage, and that Unferth is best known in the northern lands for having murdered his brothers. Beowulf concludes by telling Unferth and assembled guests that Unferth "will prowl the stalagmites of hell" for his crime.

== In film ==
In the 1981 animated film Grendel Grendel Grendel, Unferth (voiced by Ric Stone) captures Hrothgar in a bear pit, and blackmails him into making him his heir. Tension however arises from the two when Unferth falls in love with Wealhtheow and Hrothgar shows no sign of intending to keep his promise. Unferth begins to plot against the king with the court minstrel, but is murdered on Hrothgar's orders by Beowulf.

Unferth's role is expanded on in the 2007 animated film where he is played by John Malkovich. In this film he is shown to be the king's advisor and openly hostile but also learned in the ways of Christianity (he suggests to Hrothgar that they should also pray to "the new Roman God, Christ Jesus" after Grendel attacks Heorot at the beginning of the film). Deviating from the poem, Unferth's sword melts when Beowulf is seduced by Grendel's mother, forcing Beowulf to concoct a lie about having to leave his sword buried in Grendel's mother's corpse or else she would come back from the dead. Unferth also remains in the story until the final act. His family is killed in an attack by the dragon, which then has Unferth deliver a message to Beowulf – "the sins of the fathers" – revealing that the dragon is the son of Beowulf and Grendel's mother. In the film, Unferth has a servant named Cain which he continually abuses for the slightest mistake. Cain takes the role of the slave who upsets the dragon in the original story.

== See also ==
- Flyting
- Heitstrenging
- Sir Kay
- Wormtongue

== Sources ==
- Eliason, Norman E. (1963), "The þyle and Scop in Beowulf", Speculum, 38 (2): 267–284, doi:10.2307/2852453, JSTOR 2852453, S2CID 163024394
- Hollowell, Ida Masters (1976), "Unferð the þyle in Beowulf", Studies in Philology, 73: 239–265
- Ogilvy, J.D.A. (1964), "Unferth. Foil to Beowulf?", PMLA, 79 (4): 370–5, doi:10.2307/460742, JSTOR 460742, S2CID 163905593
- Rosier, James L. (1962), "Design for Treachery: The Unferth Intrigue", PMLA, 77 (1): 1–7, doi:10.2307/460680, JSTOR 460680, S2CID 163772075
