= Ongentheow =

Semi-legendary Swedish king

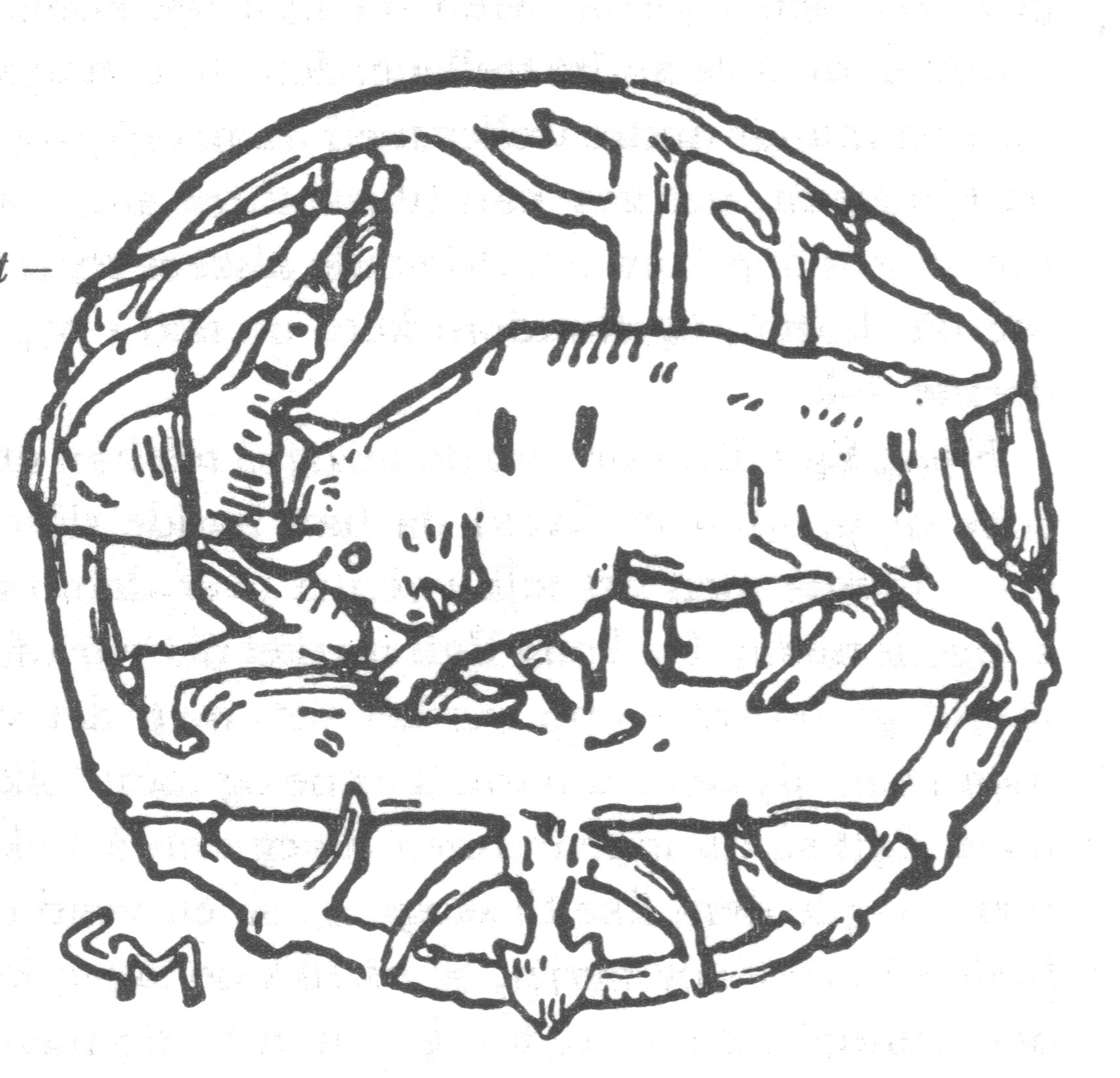
Illustration by Gerhard Munthe (1899)

Ongentheow (Old English: Ongenþeow, Ongenþio, Ongendþeow; Old Norse: Angantýr; died c. 515) was the name of a semi-legendary Swedish king of the house of Scylfings, who appears in Old English sources.

He is generally identified with the Swedish king Egil Vendelcrow mentioned in Ynglingatal, Historia Norwegiae and in Ynglinga saga. The reason why they are thought to have been the same is that each has the same position in the line of Swedish kings and is described as the father of Ohthere and grandfather of Eadgils.

The name Ongentheow contains as its second element þeōw "servant, slave". The first appears to be ongēan "against, opposite".

== Old English sources ==
=== Beowulf ===
In the Old English epic poem Beowulf, Ongentheow is described as a fearsome warrior, and it took two Geatish warriors Eofor and Wulf Wonreding to take him down.

The epic tells that the Geats under their new king Hæþcyn captured the Swedish queen, but old king Ongenþeow saved her, at a hill fort called Hrefnesholt, although they lost her gold. Ongenþeow killed Hæþcyn, and besieged the Geats at Hrefnesholt. The Geats were, however, rescued by Hygelac, Hæþcyn's brother, who arrived the next day with reinforcements. Having lost the battle, but rescued his queen, Ongenþeow and his warriors returned home.

However, the war was not over. Hygelac, the new king of the Geats, attacked the Swedes. The Geatish warriors Eofor and Wulf fought together against the hoary king Ongenþeow. Wulf hit Ongentheow's head with his sword so that the old king bled over his hair, but the king hit back and wounded Wulf. Then, Eofor retaliated by cutting through the Swedish king's shield and through his helmet, giving Ongentheow a death-blow. Eofor took the Swedish king's helmet, sword and mail and carried them to Hygelac. When they came home, Eofor and Wulf were richly rewarded, and Eofor was given Hygelac's daughter. Because of this battle, Hygelac is referred to as Ongentheow's slayer.

Family tree of the Scyldings (Kings of the Danes), Heathobards and Scylfings (Kings of the Swedes), according to Beowulf

♕ Heremod
♕ Scyld Scefing
♕ Beowulf
♕ Healfdene	♕ Ongentheow
♕ Heorogar	♕ Hrothgar	Wealhtheow	Halga	A daughter	♕ Onela	♕ Ohthere
Heoroweard	Hrethric	Hrothmund	Hrothulf	Froda	Eanmund	Eadgils
Freawaru	Ingeld

=== Widsith ===
Ongentheow is also mentioned in passing by the earlier poem Widsith as the king of Sweden:

Wald Woingum, Wod þyringum,
Sæferð Sycgum, Sweom Ongendþeow,
Sceafthere Ymbrum, Sceafa Longbeardum

Translation:

Wald [ruled] the Woings, Wod the Thuringians,
Saeferth the Sycgs, the Swedes Ongendtheow,
Sceafthere the Ymbers, Sceafa the Lombards,

== Egil ==
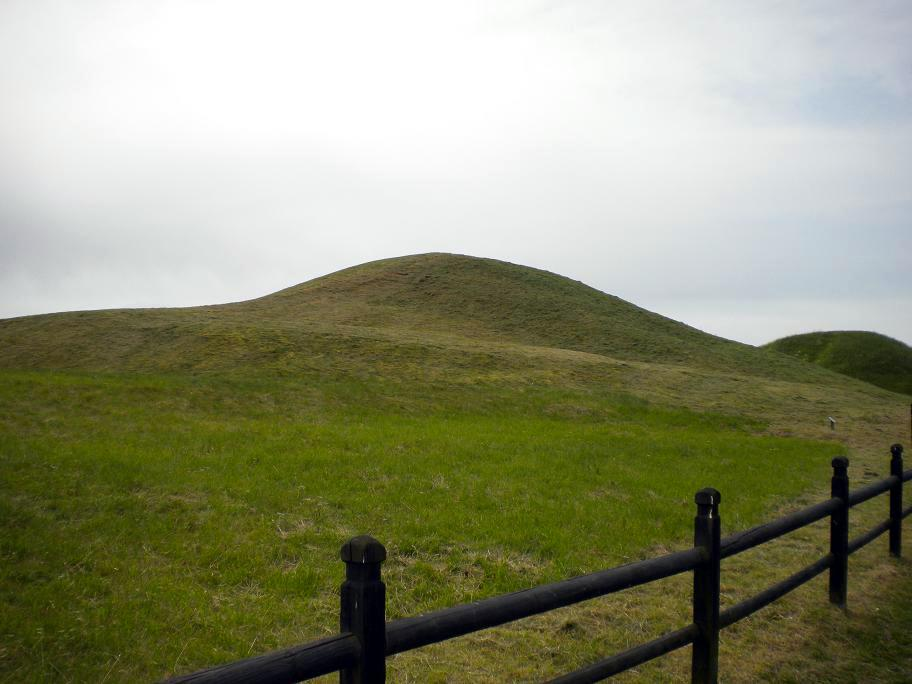
Middle royal tumulus at Old Upsala, suggested grave of King Ongentheow/Egil

In Ari Þorgilsson's Íslendingabók and in Historia Norwegiae, he was called Egil Vendelcrow (Vendilcraca/Vendilkráka, a name traditionally given to those living at the royal estate of Vendel in Sweden). Snorri Sturluson, however, gave the name Vendelcrow to Egil's son Ottar (Ohthere). In these sources, Egil was the son of Aun the Old, and like him, not very warlike. After he had made the thrall Tunni (or Tonne) responsible for the treasury, Tunni rebelled against Egil. They fought eight battles after which Egil fled to Denmark, according to the Ynglinga saga (Ynglingatal does not mention where he fled and Historia Norwegiae does not mention any escape at all). Snorri wrote that Fróði, the Danish king, aided Egil in defeating Tunni, and made Egil a tributary to the Danish king.

Egil was killed by a bull during the sacrifices at Gamla Uppsala.

Ok lofsæll
ór landi fló
Týs ôttungr
Tunna ríki.
En flæmingr
farra trjónu
jǫtuns eykr
á Agli rauð,
sás of austmǫrk
áðan hafði
brúna hǫrg
of borinn lengi.
En skíðlauss
Skilfinga nið
hœfis hjǫrr
til hjarta stóð.

Translation:

And the famous descendant of Týr [god; = Swedish king] fled the country before the power of Tunni. And the roamer, the draught-animal of the giant [BULL], which before had long borne the cairn of the brows [HEAD] about the eastern forest, reddened its weapon of the bull [HORN] upon Egill. And the sheathless sword of the bull [HORN] stuck in the heart of the descendant of the Skilfingar [= Swedish king].

The Historia Norwegiæ presents a Latin summary of Ynglingatal, older than Snorri's quotation:

Auchun vero genuit Eigil cognomento Vendilcraco, quem proprius servus nomine Tonne regno privavit, et cum domino pedisseqvus VIII civilia bella commisit, in omnibus victoria potitus, in nono tandem devictus occubuit; sed paulo post ipsum regem truculentus taurus confodiens trucidavit. Cui successit in regnum filius suus Ottarus [...]

Translation:

Aukun's son was Egil Vendelkråke, whose own bondman, Tunne, drove him from his kingdom; and though a mere servant he joined in eight civil combats with his master and won supremacy in all of them, but in a ninth he was finally defeated and killed. Shortly afterwards however the monarch was gored and slaughtered by a ferocious bull. The successor to the throne was his son Ottar, [...]

The even earlier source Íslendingabók also cites the line of descent in Ynglingatal and it also gives Egil as the successor of Aunn and the predecessor of Óttarr: xvi Aun inn gamli. xvii Egill Vendilkráka. xviii Óttarr.

== Interpretation ==
The argument for connection between Ongenþeow and Egil being the same figure are as follows. It is important, though, to note that this is an interpretation of the facts and not definite proof of a connection.

The two versions seem contradictory, but it has been shown that the two stories may very well describe the same event (Schück H. 1907, Nerman B. 1925), and that Ynglingatal was probably misinterpreted by Snorri due to a different dialectal meaning of the word farra. Ynglingatal says

en flæming
farra trjónu
jötuns eykr
á Agli rauð.

If there is any authenticity behind the traditions, the origin of Ynglingatal was most probably a Swedish poem which has not survived (see also Sundquist 2004). In Old Swedish, farra did not mean "bull" but it meant "boar" (cf. English farrow meaning "young pig"). Moreover, in Old Norse Trjóna normally meant a pig's snout (modern Scandinavian tryne). Flæmingr meant "sword" (originally a Flemish sword imported by Vikings).

Moreover, the sword of the snout can hardly refer to the horns of a bull, but it is more natural to interpret it as the tusks of a boar. In English, the lines can be translated as but the giant beast coloured its tusk red on Egil.

In Old English, the name eofor meant "boar" and consequently Ynglingatal could very well relate of Eofor (the boar) killing Egil with kennings for boars. These kennings, sung originally by Swedes, were later misinterpreted by Norwegians and Icelanders as literal expressions due to the different dialectal meanings of farra.

Moreover, according to Schück, the name Tunni which has no meaning in Old Norse should in Proto-Norse have been *Tunþa and derived from *Tunþuz. Consequently, it would have been the same word as the Gothic Tunþus which meant "tooth". This would mean that the name of Egil's enemy, actually meant "tooth" and Tunni and the bull/boar would consequently have been the same enemy, i.e. Eofor.

Some scholars have suggested that the name Ongentheow is connected to the Danish king Ongendus (fl. c. 700) who appears in one sentence of Alcuin's life of Willibrord.

== Primary sources ==
- Ynglingatal
- Ynglinga saga (part of the Heimskringla)
- Historia Norwegiae
- Beowulf
- Widsith
- Íslendingabók

== Secondary sources ==
- Nerman, B. Det svenska rikets uppkomst. Stockholm, 1925.
- Sundquist, O. "Freyr"s offspring. Rulers and religion in ancient Svea society". (2004)

Ongentheow House of Yngling
Preceded by Aunn inn gamli (Edwin the Old)	Legendary king of Sweden	Succeeded by Óttarr (Ohthere)
