= Hæþcyn =

Son of Hreðel in Beowulf

Hæthcyn (Old English: Hæþcyn) is the son of the Geatish king Hreðel in the Old English poem Beowulf.

The hero Beowulf is Hæþcyn's nephew. Hæþcyn kills his elder brother Herebeald with an arrow in a hunting accident, which causes their father Hrethel to die from grief. Then Hæþcyn becomes king of Geatland. During the Swedish-Geatish wars, Hæþcyn kidnaps the Swedish queen, and is killed fighting with the Swedish king Ongenþeow who saved her. The Geatish warriors seek refuge in Hrefnesholt, where they are rescued by Hygelac, who arrives the next day with reinforcements. His warrior Eofor kills the Swedish king. Hæþcyn is succeeded by Hygelac.

Legendary titles
Preceded by Hreðel	King of the Geats	Succeeded by Hygelac
