= Weohstan =

Legendary character from Anglo-Saxon and Norse writing

A mention of Weohstan in the Beowulf

Weohstan, Wēohstān or Wīhstān (Proto-Germanic *Wīhastainaz, meaning "sacred stone", Old Norse: Vésteinn [ˈweːˌstɛinː] and Wǣstēn) is a legendary character who appears in the Anglo-Saxon epic poem Beowulf, and scholars have pointed out that he also appears to be present in the Norse Kálfsvísa.

In both Beowulf and Kálfsvísa, Weohstan (Vésteinn) fought for his king Onela (Áli) against Eadgils (Aðils).

== Beowulf ==
According to Beowulf, Weohstan is the father of Wiglaf, and he belongs to a clan called the Wægmundings. Ecgþeow, the father of Beowulf, also belonged to this clan, so Weohstan is in some degree related to Beowulf. Thus he counts Weohstan's son Wiglaf as his kinsman.

Weohstan is said to have died of old age before the action of the later part of the poem. Weohstan is first mentioned at line 2602. We learn that he had held a Geatland estate and rights in common land which Beowulf gave to him.

When the Scylfing prince Eanmund rebelled against his uncle, Onela, the king of Sweden, Weohstan fought in the service of Onela and killed Eanmund in battle; for this Onela gave Weohstan Eanmund's sword and armour. In his old age, Weohstan gave this sword and armour to his son Wiglaf. By that time both Weohstan and Wiglaf "lived among the Geats". His name appears in several places where Wiglaf is described as "the son of Weohstan".

The scholar Frederick Klaeber speculated that though Onela himself did not seek a feud with Weohstan, once Onela was dead and Eanmund's brother Eadgils became king of the Swedes, Weohstan found it prudent to leave the service of the Scylfings, and this was how he came to be living among the Geats.

== Kálfsvísa ==
In the part of Snorri Sturluson's Skáldskaparmál which is called the Kálfsvísa, the name Weohstan appears in its Old Norse form Vésteinn. Moreover, he is mentioned together with his lord Onela (Áli) and enemy Eadgils (Aðils), and the section concerns the Battle on the Ice of Lake Vänern after which the exile suggested by Klaeber would have taken place:

Vésteinn Vali, en Vífill Stúfi, Meinþjófr Mói, en Morginn Vakri, Áli Hrafni, er til íss riðu, en annarr austr und Aðilsi grár hvarfaði, geiri undaðr.	Vésteinn rode Valr, And Vifill rode Stúfr; Meinthjófr rode Mór, And Morginn on Vakr ("Watchful, Nimble, Ambling, or perhaps Hawk"); Áli rode Hrafn, They who rode onto the ice: But another, southward, Under Adils, A gray one, wandered, Wounded with the spear.

The section apparently mentions Weohstan and his fellow warriors riding together with their king Onela out on the ice, where they meet Eadgils. However, the skald of the Kálfsvísa expected the listener to be familiar with these characters and mentions no more of what happened. However, as is told in passing in Beowulf and more in detail by Snorri, Eadgils won the battle.
