= Hygelac =

Legendary king of Geats

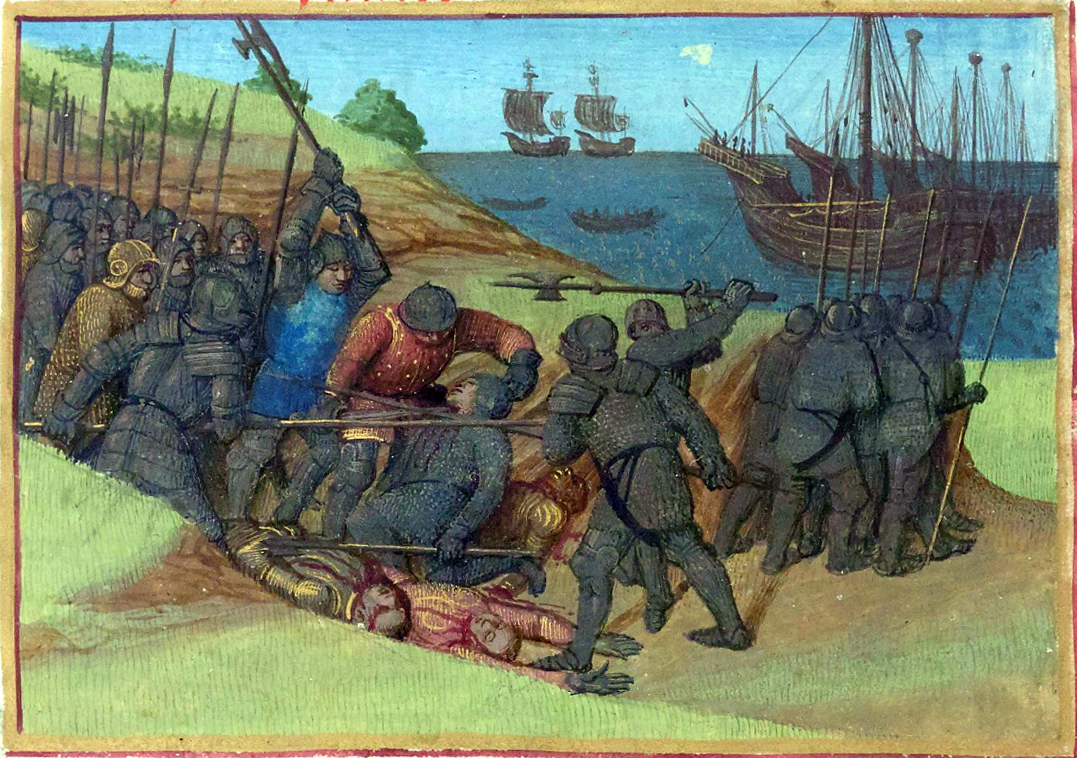
Anachronistic portrait depicting a battle between Franks and Danes in 515, from Jean Fouquet's illumination in the Grandes Chroniques de France, Tours, c 1455-60

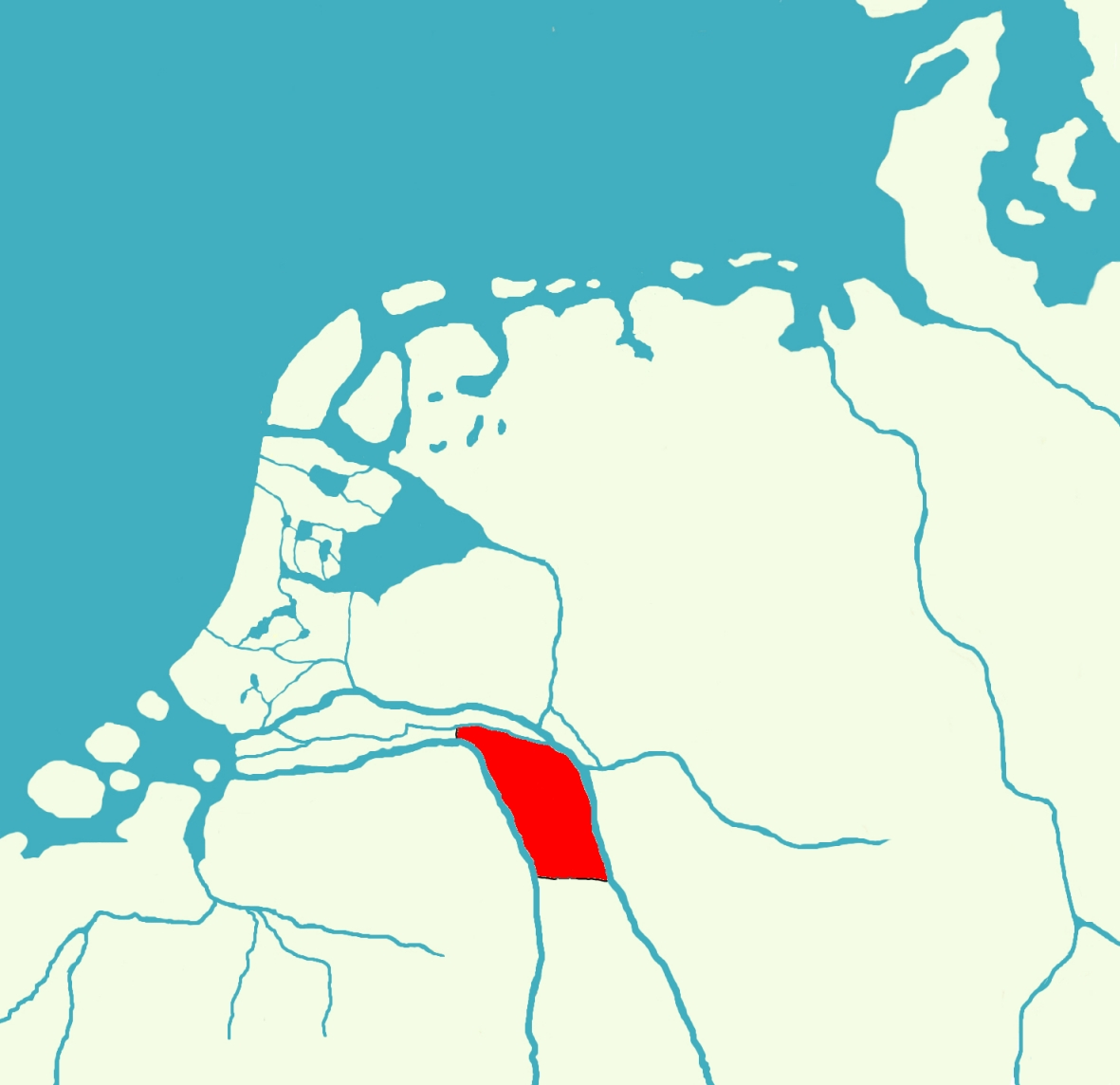
Hettergouw at the lower Rhine, inhabited by the Attoarii or Hetware, who killed Hygelac, according to Beowulf, line 2916

Hygelac (Old English: Hygelāc; Old Norse: Hugleikr; Proto-Germanic: *Hugilaikaz; Latin: Ch(l)ochilaicus or Hugilaicus; died c. 516 or 521) was a king of the Geats according to the poem Beowulf. It is Hygelac's presence in the poem which has allowed scholars to tentatively date the setting of the poem as well as to infer that it contains at least some points of historical fact. Beowulf gives Hygelac's genealogy: according to the poem, he was the son of Hrethel and had two brothers Herebeald and Hæþcyn, as well as an unnamed sister who was married to Ecgtheow and was the mother of the hero Beowulf. Hygelac was married to Hygd, and they had a son Heardred and an unnamed daughter who married Eofor. When Hygelac's brother Hæþcyn was fighting with the Swedes, Hygelac arrived at Hrefnesholt one day too late to save his brother Hæþcyn, but he managed to rescue the surviving Geatish warriors, who were besieged by the Swedish king Ongentheow and his three sons. The Swedes found refuge at a hill fort but were assaulted by the Geats. In the battle, the Swedish king was slain by Eofor. After the death of his brother Herebeald, Hygelac ascended the Geatish throne. After he was killed during a raid on Frisia, Hygelac was succeeded by Heardred, according to Beowulf.

== Historical identification ==
The raid to Frisia enabled N. F. S. Grundtvig to approximate the date of Hygelac's death to c. 516, because a raid to France under a Danish King Chlochilaicus is mentioned by Gregory of Tours. In that source he is recorded as invading the Frankish Kingdoms during the reign of Theodericus I (died 534), the son of Clovis ("Chlodovechus"), the king of the Franks in the early sixth century, and was killed in the ensuing chaos after the Scandinavian raiders were caught by the sudden appearance of a military response force led by Theodericus I’s son, Theodebertus. After the defeat the rest of the survivors took to sea in such disordered haste that they left their dead on the field, including their king. The Franks must have taken back whatever had been taken in pillage as well as spoils of the battlefield; and it is reported by Gregory that they found the corpse of Chlochilaicus so awe-inspiring due his extraordinary height, that, as a pagan barbarian not entitled to burial, his remains were exposed for a long time in the nearest Merovingian Court as a curiosity, following the usual triumphal trophy exhibition customary after battle or pirate captures.

While Gregory calls him a king of the Danes, the much younger Liber historiae Francorum instead calls him a king of the Goths (rege Gotorum), agreeing with Beowulf.

== Transmission to England ==
There are two theories on how the account of the Frankish raid came to be preserved in the English epic Beowulf, and they have a bearing upon the date assigned to the poem.

=== Oral transmission ===
One view considers the account to have been kept alive by the oral tradition of heroic poetry until it was included in the epos. That Hygelac was known in England already in the early eighth century is seen by the Liber Monstrorum ("Book of Monsters"), where he is referred to as Higlacus:

Et fiunt monstra mirae magnitudinis, ut rex Higlacus, qui imperavit Getis et a Francis occisus est, quem equus a duodecimo aetatis anno portare non potuit. Cuius ossa in Rheni fluminis insula, ubi in Oceanum prorumpit, reservata sunt, et de longinquo venientibus pro miraculo ostenduntur.

And there are monsters of an amazing size, like King Hygelac, who ruled the Geats and was killed by the Franks, whom no horse could carry from the age of twelve. His bones are preserved on an island in the river Rhine, where it breaks into the Ocean, and they are shown as a wonder to travellers from afar.

Leonard Neidorf argues that the authors of Beowulf and the Liber Monstrorum must have been relying on a shared oral legendary tradition ultimately stemming from Scandinavia, since they could not have reconstructed the etymologically accurate forms Higlac and Hygelac based on the garbled Frankish Chlochilaicus.

=== Literary transmission ===
Other scholars have instead suggested that the episode shows that Beowulf was composed as late as the 10th century, the date of the sole surviving manuscript. It has been suggested that the poem is in fact dependent on the Liber historiae Francorum, because it mentions the Attoarii, which in Beowulf become Hetware. One scholar considers it to be inconceivable that independent oral tradition would have faithfully transmitted such a detail. German historian Walter Goffart estimated that Beowulf could not have been written with these historical details before 923.

The Hrethlings (Kings of the Geats), according to Beowulf

Swerting (Note: The relationship between Swerting and Hreðel is not clear from the poem. He may also have been his father, or his brother-in-law.)
daughter	Hreðel ♕	Hæreð
Herebeald	Hæþcyn ♕	Hygelac ♕	Hygd	daughter	Ecgþeow
Heardred ♕	daughter	Eofor	Beowulf ♕

== See also ==
- Hugleik
- Chlochilaicus

== Sources and notes ==
Legendary titles
Preceded by Hæthcyn	(legendary); King of the Geats	Succeeded by Heardred
