= Eofor =

Eofor (Proto-Norse *Eburaz), son of Wonred, was a Geatish warrior in Beowulf. When the Swedes invaded Geatland (Götaland), the Geatish king Hæþcyn was killed by the Swedish king Ongenþeow. Hygelac, who became the new king, sent Eofor and his brother Wulf to fight against the hoary-bearded Swedish king. During the fight Wulf was severely wounded, but Eofor slew Ongenþeow and carried Ongenþeow's arms to Hygelac. Eofor and Wulf were not only richly recompensed, but Eofor was given the greatest possible gift for his service, the daughter of Hygelac.

J. R. R. Tolkien, who studied Beowulf intensively, used the name Éofor as the name of a prince of a warrior people in the background history for The Lord of the Rings.

Eofor is Old English for "boar".

It is widely agreed that Ongenþeow is identical to King Egil (also Angantyr) in the Ynglingasaga. In this saga, Egil is killed by a bull, which likely originates from a mistranslation of the Ynglingatal, where he was killed by a boar. As such, it's possible that this means that the name Eofor was misinterpreted in later stories as a literal boar that killed the king of the Swedes.
