= Hrethel =

Legendary king of Geats

Hrethel (Old English: Hrēðel; Proto-Germanic: *Hrōþilaz) is a king of the Geats.

== Name ==
Hrethel's name appears with both the root vowel ⟨e⟩ and ⟨æ⟩ and with both the consonant ⟨þ⟩ (i.e. the phoneme /θ/, pronounced [ð] in Old English) and ⟨d⟩ (which would ordinarily represent the phoneme /d/). This is thought to be due to an early manuscript of Beowulf writing the root vowel using the early graphs ⟨œ⟩ (for the vowel resulting from the i-mutation of Common Germanic /o:/) and ⟨d⟩ (for the phoneme /θ/, pronounced [ð]). Later scribes misread the former as ⟨æ⟩ and failed to recognise that the latter represented the sound [ð] rather than [d].

The name also appears as a genitive weak noun, in the half-line "þæt is Hrǣdlan lāf" ('that is Hrǣdla's bequest'). Rendered in ordinary Late West Saxon spelling and in nominative form, this form of the name would presumably have been *Hrēðla.

== Role in Beowulf ==
Hrethel is married to a sister or daughter of Swerting (Hygelac is the nefa of Swerting) and he has three sons: Hæþcyn, Herebeald and Hygelac. He also has a daughter who marries Ecgþeow and has the son Beowulf.

Hrethel fosters Beowulf (his grandson) by taking him into his royal household aged seven. Fostering was a common Germanic practice and does not indicate Beowulf's father, Ecgþeow did not want to raise him; indeed, the practice was intended to further improve relations between families and family members, and create close ties of obligation, affection and shared responsibility. As an adult, Beowulf expresses his gratitude to his foster-father explicitly:

Iċ wæs syfanwintre þā meċ sinca baldọr,
frēawine folca æt mīnum fæder ġenam;
hēold meċ ond hæfde Hrēðel cyning,
ġēaf me sinċ ond symbẹl, sibbe ġemunde;
næs iċ him tō līfe lāðra ōwihte,
beorn in beorgum, þonne his bearna hwylċ,
Herebeald ond Hæðcyn oððe Hyġelāc mīn.

Translation:

I was seven winters old when the lord of treasures,
friend of the people, received me from my father;
King Hrethel nurtured me and kept me,
gave me treasure and feasting, he remembered our kinship;
I was in no respect more hateful to him in his life,
a child in the cities, than any of his children,
Herebeald and Hæthcyn, or my lord Hygelac.

Hreðel dies of grief when his oldest son Herebeald is killed by his own brother Hæþcyn in a hunting accident, a death that could not be avenged. He is succeeded by Hæþcyn.

=== Hrethel's heirlooms ===
There are two pieces of "Hrethel's heirloom" handed down to his grandson Beowulf in the poem. First is Hreðlan lāf (v. 454), which is a war-shirt or mail coat crafted by Weland smith, which he already owns at the beginning of the poem, and bequeaths it to Hygelac in the event of his death. The other is Hrēðles lāfe (v. 2191), heirloom sword, which he received from his uncle Hygelac after his feat of destroy the Grendel-kin.

Legendary titles
Preceded by Swerting	King of the Geats	Succeeded by Hæþcyn
