= Norse clans =

Scandinavian lineage

The Scandinavian clan or ætt/ätt (pronounced [ˈæːtː] in Old Norse) was a social group based on common descent, equivalent to a clan.

== History ==
In the absence of a police force, the clan was the primary force of security in Norse society, as the clansmen were obliged by honour to avenge one another. The Norse clan was not tied to a certain territory in the same way as a Scottish clan, where the chief owned the territory. The land of the Scandinavian clan was owned by the individuals who had close neighbours from other clans. The name of the clan was derived from its ancestor, often with the addition of an -ung or -ing ending. The original meaning of ætt/ätt seems to have simply been "those who are related". A person could technically belong to several clans, but usually the identification of an individual came with ancestry of most prestige. Therefore, through mostly the exception to the rule, a clan could have matrilineal name if the descent of the ancestral mother was considered more important than the father. Family names were not in use, instead patronyms and matronyms were used, likewise depending on the favoured ancestry. Therefore, the clan names reflected the common descent of family groups.

The heavy dependence on family and kindred in early Scandinavian history was the foundation of the importance clan. The Thing served as a moderating force which could prevent blood feuds between the clans due to the importance of kinship. As central government gradually was established in Scandinavia, the ætt lost its relevance for commoners. For royalty and nobility, however, it remained in use as the name for line and dynasty.

Examples of clans:

- Wægmunding, in Beowulf.
- Ylfing or Wulfing in Beowulf and Norse Sagas.
- Scylfing (Yngling)
- Skjöldung (Scylding)
- Völsung

== See also ==
- Sippe
- Japanese clans
