= Heiko Uecker =

German philologist (1939–2019)

- Born: 5 September 1939; Nuremberg, Germany
- Died: 30 May 2019 (aged 79); Bonn, Germany
- Awards: Willy Brandt Prize; Knight of the Royal Norwegian Order of Merit

Academic background
- Education: Ludwig-Maximilians-Universität München

Academic work
- Discipline: Germanic philology
- Sub-discipline: Old Norse philology
- Institutions: University of Bonn
- Main interests: Early Germanic literature; Old Norse literature; Scandinavian literature

Heiko Uecker (5 September 1939 – 30 May 2019) was a German philologist who specialized in Germanic studies. He was Professor of Nordic Philology at the University of Bonn and a known expert on Scandinavian literature.

== Biography ==
Heiko Uecker was born in Nuremberg, Germany on 5 September 1939. After graduating from Neues Gymnasium Nürnberg, Uecker studied Nordic and German philology at the Ludwig-Maximilians-Universität München and the University of Oslo. He received his Ph.D. in 1966 with the thesis Die altnordischen Bestattungssitten in der literarischen Überlieferung, which examined descriptions of Norse funerals in Old Norse literature.

Uecker completed his habilitation in 1977, and subsequently served as a visiting professor at the University of Chicago. In 1982, Uecker was appointed Professor of Nordic Philology at the University of Bonn. He served as Head of the Department of Scandinavian Studies at the University of Bonn. From 1982 to 1988, and 2006 to 2010, Uecker was the Chairman of the Deutsch-Norwegische Gesellschaft.

Uecker specialized in the study of Scandinavian literature. He was an authority on both medieval and modern Scandinavian literature, and also early Germanic literature, on which he was the author of numerous works. He is known for his research on Norwegian authors Henrik Ibsen and Knut Hamsun. He contributed significantly to the improvement of Germany–Norway relations. In 2004, Uecker received both the Willy Brandt Prize and the Royal Norwegian Order of Merit.

Uecker was married to Kari Uecker. He was the father of actor Georg Uecker.

Uecker retired from the University of Bonn in 2004. He died in Bonn on 30 May 2019.

== See also ==
- Heinrich Beck (philologist)
- Heinz Klingenberg (philologist)
- Klaus Böldl
- Klaus von See
- Kurt Schier
- Rudolf Simek
- Arnulf Krause
- Robert Nedoma
- Wilhelm Heizmann

== Selected works ==
- Geschichte der altnordischen Literatur. Stuttgart: Reclam 2004. ISBN 3-15-017647-6.
- (mit Joachim Trinkwitz): Die Klassiker der skandinavischen Literatur. Die großen Autoren vom 18. Jahrhundert bis zur Gegenwart. Essen: Meysenburg 2002. ISBN 3-930508-12-5. (Überarbeitete Neuauflage der Ausgabe Düsseldorf: Econ 1990.)
- Germanische Heldensage. Stuttgart: Metzler 1972 (=Sammlung Metzler, Bd. 106).

== Sources ==
Fechner-Smarsly, Thomas (14 December 2019). "Nachruf auf Heiko Uecker". European Journal of Scandinavian Studies. 49 (2). De Gruyter: 227–229. doi:10.1515/ejss-2019-0017. ISSN 2191-9402. S2CID 210077096.
