= Germania =

Historical region in north-central Europe

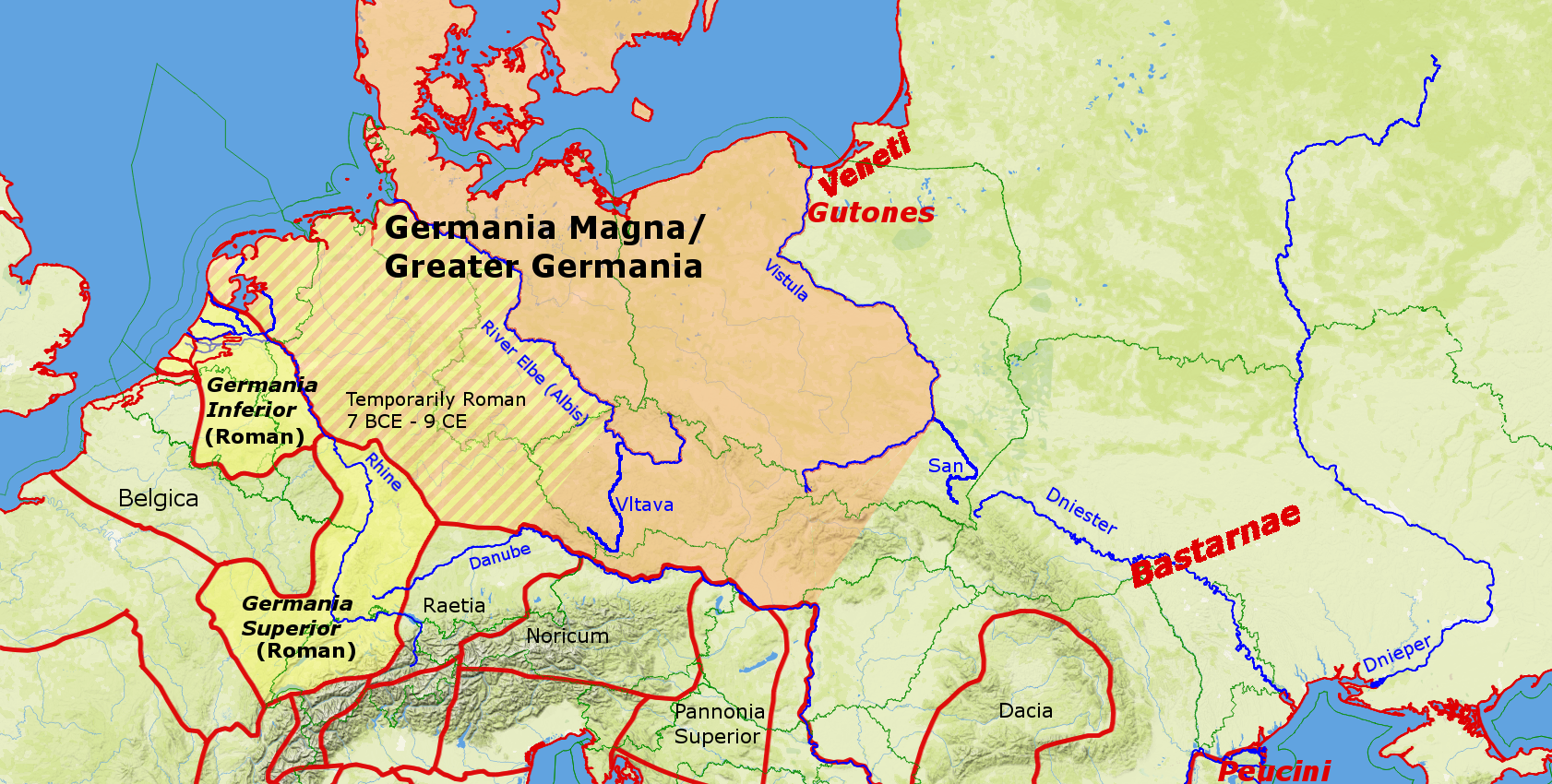
Several different regions called Germania (modern borders in green)

Germania (/dʒərˈmeɪni.ə/ jər-MAY-nee-ə; Latin: [ɡɛrˈmaːni.a]), also more specifically called Magna Germania (English: Greater Germania), Germania Libera (English: Free Germania), or Germanic Barbaricum to distinguish it from the Roman provinces of Germania Inferior and Germania Superior, was a historical region in north-central Europe during the Roman era, which was associated by Roman authors with the Germanic peoples. According to Roman geographers, this region stretched roughly from the Rhine in the west to the Vistula in the east, and to the Upper Danube in the south, and the known parts of southern Scandinavia in the north. Archaeologically, these people correspond roughly to the Roman Iron Age of those regions.

The Latin name Germania means "land of the Germani", but the etymology of the name Germani itself is uncertain. During the Gallic Wars of the 1st century BC, the Roman general Julius Caesar encountered Germani originating from beyond the Rhine. He referred to their lands beyond the Rhine as "Germania". West of the Rhine, the prosperous Roman provinces of Germania Superior and Germania Inferior, sometimes collectively referred to as "Roman Germania", were established in northeast Roman Gaul, while territories east of the Rhine remained independent of Roman control. The Roman emperors also sought to expand east of the Rhine to the Elbe, but these efforts were hampered by the victory of Arminius at the Battle of the Teutoburg Forest in 9 AD.

From the 3rd century AD, Germanic peoples moving out of Magna Germania began encroaching upon and occupying parts of Roman Germania. This contributed to the fall of the Western Roman Empire in the 5th century AD, after which territories of Roman Germania were captured and settled by migrating Germanic people. Large parts of Germania subsequently became part of the Frankish Empire and later East Francia. The name of Germany in English and many other languages is derived from the name Germania.

== Etymology ==
"The name Germany, on the other hand, they say, is modern and newly introduced, from the fact that the tribes which first crossed the Rhine and drove out the Gauls, and are now called Tungrians, were then called Germans. Thus what was the name of a tribe, and not of a race, gradually prevailed, till all called themselves by this self-invented name of Germans, which the conquerors had first employed to inspire terror."

— Tacitus

In Latin, the name Germania means "lands where people called Germani live". Modern scholars do not agree on the etymology of the name Germani. Celtic, Germanic, Illyrian and Latin etymologies have been suggested.

The main source on the origin of the names Germania and Germani is the book Germania (98 AD) by Tacitus. Tacitus writes that the name Germania was "modern and newly introduced". According to Tacitus, the name Germani had once been applied only to the Tungri, west of the Rhine, but it became an "artificial name" (invento nomine) for supposedly-related peoples east of the Rhine. Many modern scholars consider Tacitus's story to be plausible, but they are unsure whether the name was commonly used by Germani to refer to themselves.

== Geography ==
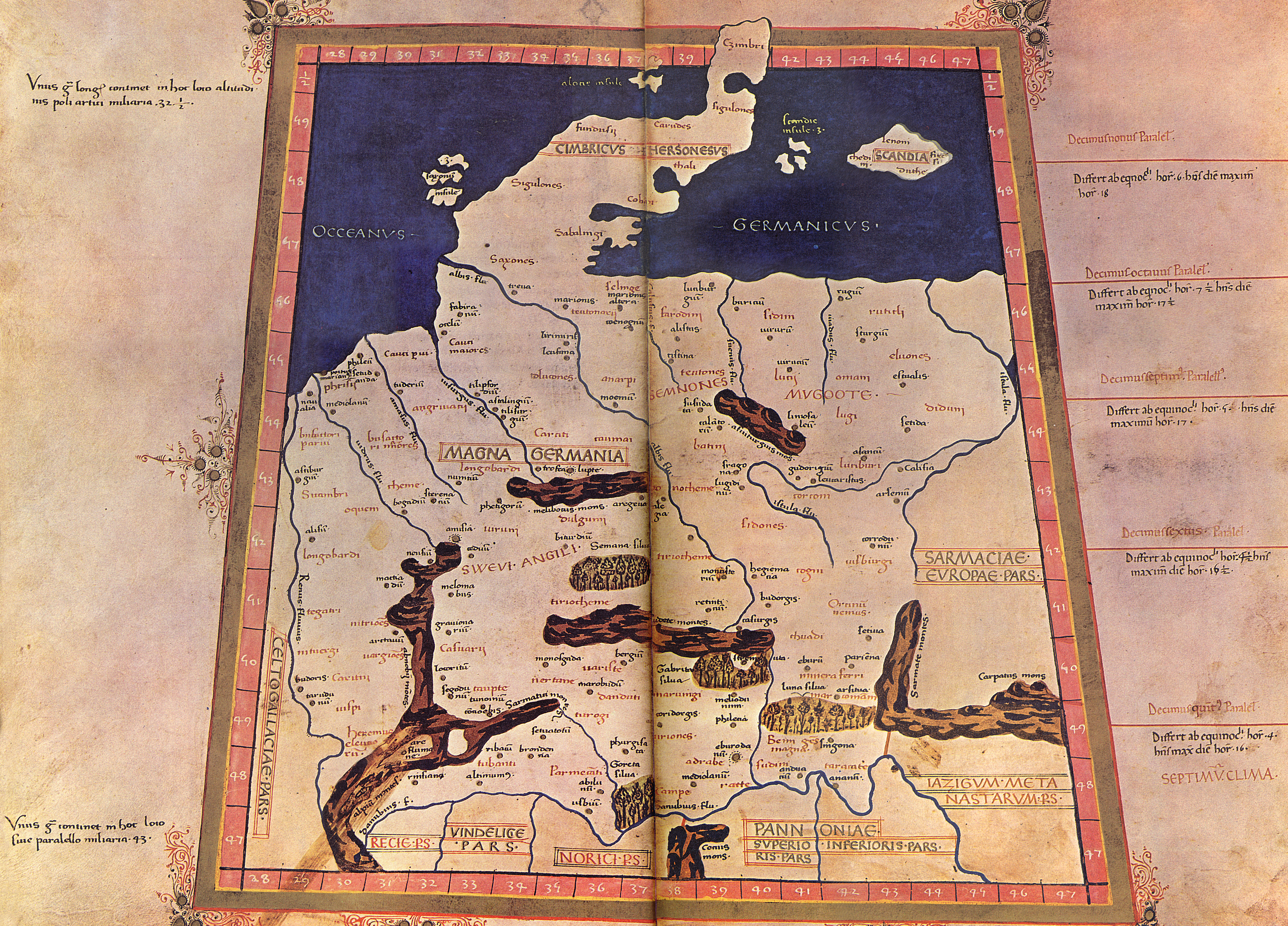
15th-century map of Germania as described by Ptolemy in Geography (Ptolemy) (c. 150 AD)

The boundaries of Germania are not clearly defined, particularly at its northern and eastern fringes. Magna Germania stretched approximately from the Rhine in the west to beyond the Vistula river in the east, and from the Danube in the south and northwards along the North and Baltic seas, including Scandinavia. Germania Superior encompassed parts of modern-day Switzerland, southwest Germany and eastern France, while Germania Inferior encompassed much of modern-day Belgium and Netherlands.

In his Geography (AD 150), the Roman geographer Ptolemy provides descriptions of the geography of Germania. Modern scholars have been able to localize many of the place names mentioned by Ptolemy, and associated them with place names of the present day.

Germania was inhabited by a large number of peoples, and there was not much unity among them. It appears that Germania was not entirely inhabited by Germanic peoples. Hydronymy provides evidence for the presence of another Indo-European group, which probably lived under Germanic domination.

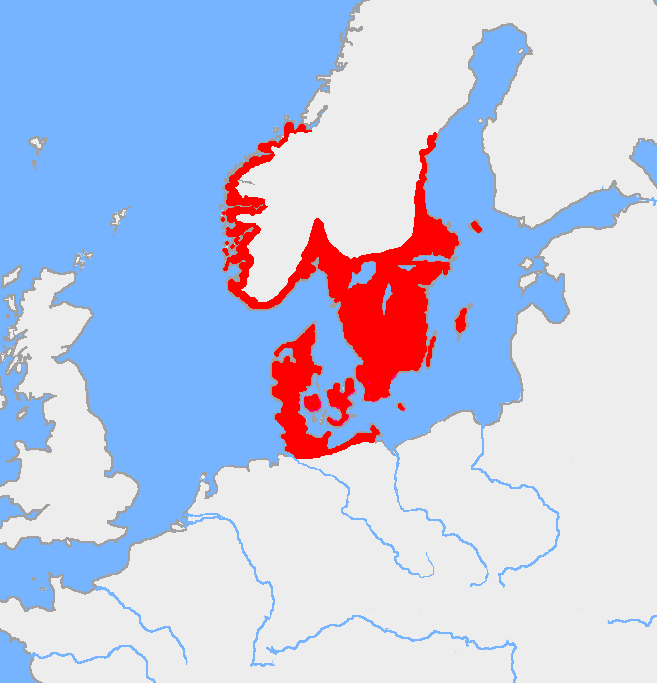
Area of the Nordic Bronze Age culture, which is considered ancestral to the Germanic people, c. 1750–500 BC

== History ==
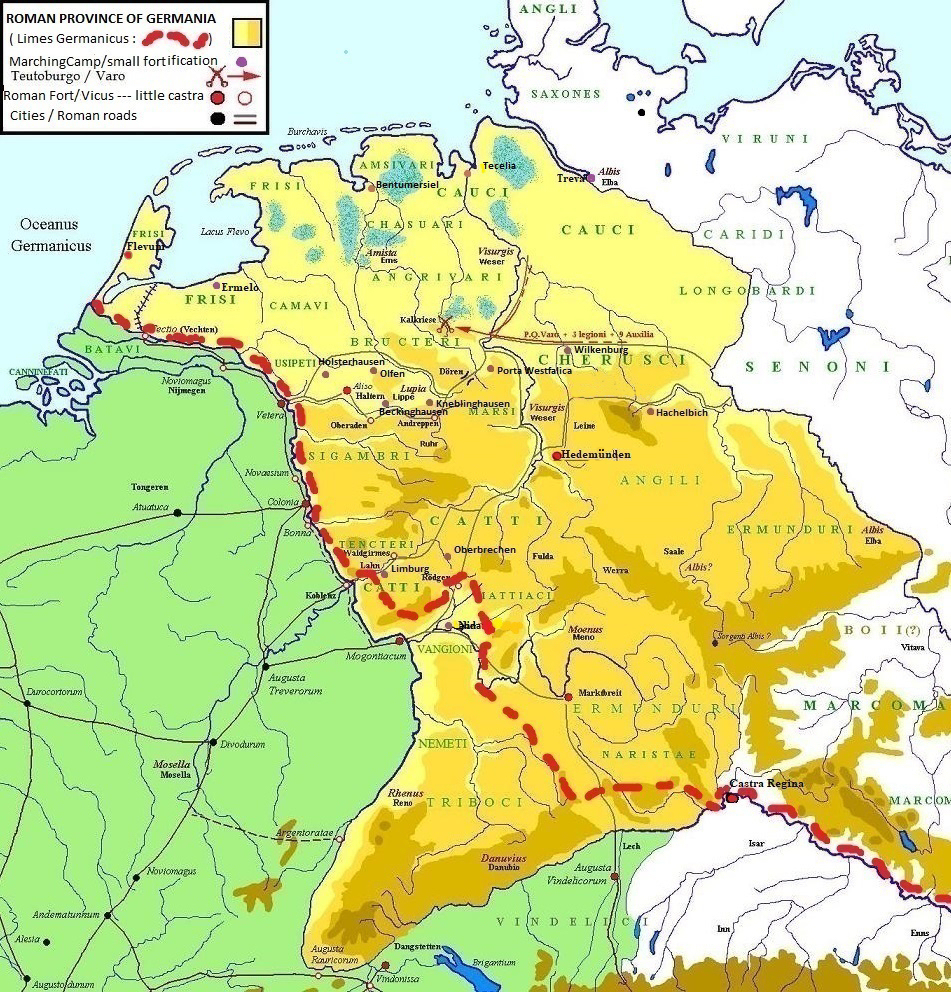
Map of the Roman province of Germania Antiqua (marked in yellow), from 7 BC to AD 9

During the Gallic Wars of the 1st century BC, the Roman general Julius Caesar came into contact with peoples originating east of the Rhine. In his Commentarii de Bello Gallico, Caesar refers to these peoples as the Germani, and the lands from where they originated as Germania. The Romans appear to have borrowed the name from the Gauls. Having defeated the Germanic chieftain Ariovistus in Gaul, Caesar built bridges across the Rhine and conducted punitive expeditions in Germania. He writes the area was composed of numerous Germanic states, which were not entirely united. According to Caesar, the Gallic Volcae Tectosages had once crossed the Rhine and colonized parts of Germania, but had since become militarily inferior to the Germani. He also writes that Germani had once crossed the Rhine into northeast Gaul and driven away its Gallic inhabitants, and that the Belgae claimed to be largely descended from these Germanic invaders.

"There are still to be seen in the groves of Germany the Roman standards which I hung up to our country's gods... [O]ne thing there is which Germans will never thoroughly excuse, their having seen between the Elbe and the Rhine the Roman rods, axes, and toga... If you prefer your fatherland, your ancestors, your ancient life to tyrants and to new colonies, follow as your leader Arminius to glory and to freedom..."

— Arminius

In the late 1st century BC, the Roman emperor Augustus launched campaigns across the Rhine, and incorporated areas of Germania as far east as the Elbe into the Roman Empire, creating the short-lived Roman province of Germania Antiqua in 7 BC, with further aims of establishing a greater province of Magna Germania, with headquarters at Colonia (modern-day Cologne). The Roman campaign was severely hampered by the victory of Arminius at the Battle of the Teutoburg Forest in AD 9. The outcome of this battle dissuaded the Romans from their ambition of conquering Germania, and is thus considered one of the most important events in European history. The Rhine eventually became the border between the Roman Empire and Magna Germania. Areas of northeast Gaul bordering the Rhine remained under Roman control, and are often referred to as "Roman Germania". Four Roman legions were stationed there, and a Roman fleet, the Classis Germanica, was also established. The area was effectively governed as Roman provinces.

Areas of Germania independent of Roman control were referred to as "Magna Germania". Modern scholars sometimes refer to the Magna Germania as "Free Germania" (Latin: Germania Libera) or Germanic Barbaricum. As parts of Roman social engineering efforts, large numbers of Germani, including Ubii and Sicambri, were settled within Roman Germania in order to prevent revolts by resident Gauls. Roman Germania became characterized by a mixed Celtic, Germanic and Roman population, which became progressively Romanized.

By the mid 1st century AD, between eight and ten Roman legions were stationed in Roman Germania to protect the frontiers. From AD 69 to AD 70, Roman Germania was heavily affected by the Revolt of the Batavi. Tacitus writes that the leader of the revolt, Gaius Julius Civilis, recruited a vast amount of warriors from his self-described "kinsmen" all over Germania, and hailed Arminius for having liberated Germania from slavery. Civilis' rebels seized Colonia (modern-day Cologne), capital of Roman Germania and home of the Germanic Ubii, who according to Tacitus were considered traitors by other Germani for having "forsworn its native country". After initially seeking to raze all of Colonia to the ground, the forces of Civilis declared the city returned "into the unity of the German nation and name" and "an open city for all Germans". Although initially declaring the rebels and "other Germans" their "kinsmen by blood", the Ubii, a Germanic Tribe eventually assisted the Romans in recapturing the Colonia.

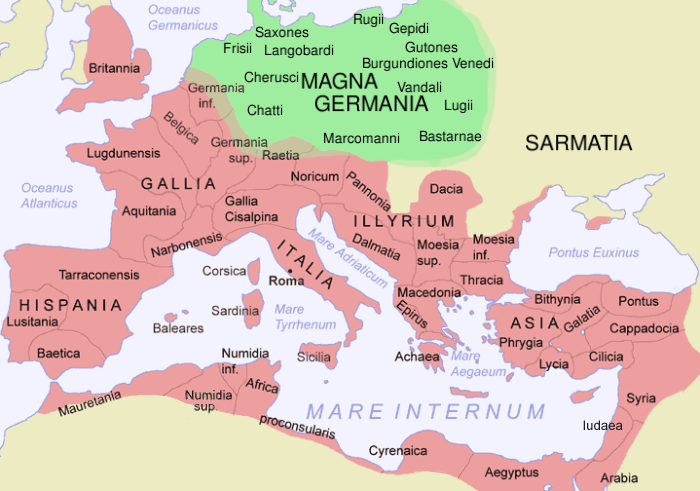
Map of the Roman Empire and Magna Germania in the early 2nd century AD

In the late 1st century AD, under the leadership of the Flavian dynasty, the provinces of Germania Inferior (headquartered at Colonia) and Germania Superior (headquartered at Mogontiacum) were created out of Roman Germania and other eastern parts of Roman Gaul. They hosted a large military force and carried out lucrative trade with Magna Germania, which greatly contributed to the wealth of Roman Gaul. Germania (98 AD) by Tacitus provided vivid descriptions of the peoples of Magna Germania.

In the late 1st and early 2nd century AD, the Romans reoccupied areas lying between the Rhine, Main, and Danube rivers. This area became known as the Agri Decumates. Additional numbers of Germani were settled by the Romans within this area. The Roman fortifications on the border with Magna Germania were known as the Limes Germanicus. The 3rd century AD saw the emergence of several powerful Germanic confederations in Magna Germania, such as the Alemanni and Franks. The Crisis of the Third Century included raids on Roman Germania by Alemanni and Franks, and the area briefly became part of the Gallic Empire established by the usurper Postumus. Around 280 AD, the Agri Decumates were evacuated by the Romans and occupied by Alemanni.

Under Diocletian (3rd century AD), Germania Superior was renamed Germania Secunda, while Germania Inferior was renamed Maxima Sequanorum. Both provinces were under the Diocese of Gaul. The provinces of Roman Germania continued to be subjected to repeated Alemannic and Frankish attacks. In the late 4th century AD and early 5th century AD, Gothic Wars in the Balkans forced the Romans to withdraw troops from Roman Germania. In 406, a large number of people fleeing the Huns crossed the Rhine from Magna Germania into Roman Germania and Gaul, leading to the eventual collapse of Roman rule there, and the emigration of large numbers of Romans, particularly Roman elites. Roman Germania was subsequently occupied by Alemanni and Franks. During subsequent centuries, peoples of Germania played a major role in dismembering what was left of the Western Roman Empire. Large parts of Germania, including all of Roman Germania, were eventually incorporated into the Frankish Empire.

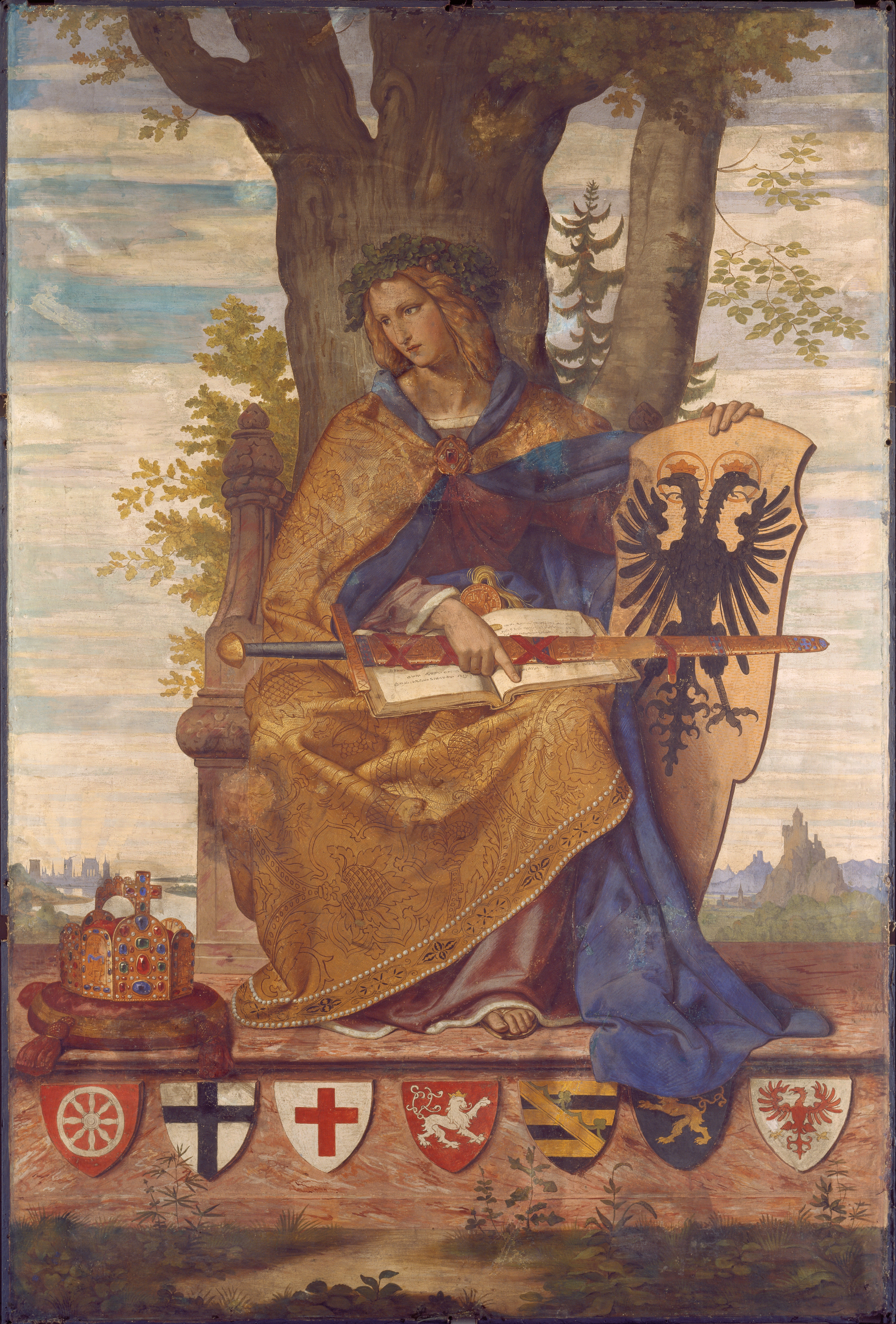
Painting of Germania, the personification of Germany and the Germans, by Philipp Veit, 1836

== Archaeology ==
From the 1st to the 4th century AD, Magna Germania corresponds archaeologically to the Roman Iron Age. In recent years, progress in archaeology has contributed greatly to the understanding of Germania. Areas of Magna Germania were largely agrarian, and display archaeological commonalities with each other, while being strongly differentiated from that of Roman Germania, largely due to the absence of cities and independent coinage. Archaeological discoveries testify to flourishing trade between Magna Germania and the Roman Empire. Amber was a primary export out of Magna Germania, while Roman luxury goods were imported on a large scale. Such goods have been found as far as Scandinavia and Western Russia.

== Legacy ==
The name Germania is attested in Old English translations of Bede and Orosius. Since the 17th century, the most common name of Germany in English has been derived from the name Germania.

== See also ==
- Scythia
- Illyria
- Thrace
- Dacia
- Scandza
- Hibernia
- Thule
- Germania (city)
- Rhine

== Citations and sources ==
=== Ancient sources ===
- Caesar (1869). Commentaries on the Gallic War. Translated by McDevitte, William Alexander; Bohn, W. S.
- Ptolemy (1932). Geography. New York Public Library.
- Tacitus (1876a). Germania. Translated by Church, Alfred John; Brodribb, William Jackson.
- Tacitus (1876b). The Annals. Translated by Church, Alfred John; Brodribb, William Jackson.
- Tacitus (1876c). The Histories. Translated by Church, Alfred John; Brodribb, William Jackson.

=== Modern sources ===
- Clay, Cheryl Louise (2008). "Developing the 'Germani' in Roman Studies". Theoretical Roman Archaeology Journal. 1 (2007). Open Library of Humanities: 131–150. doi:10.16995/TRAC2007_131_150.
- Davidson, Hilda Ellis (1988). Myths and Symbols in Pagan Europe. Syracuse University Press. ISBN 0-8156-2441-7.
- Drinkwater, John Frederick (2012). "Germania". In Hornblower, Simon; Spawforth, Antony; Eidinow, Esther (eds.). The Oxford Classical Dictionary (4 ed.). Oxford University Press. p. 612. ISBN 9780191735257.
- Heather, Peter (2007). "Germania and the Limits of the Empire". The Fall of the Roman Empire: A New History of Rome and the Barbarians. Oxford University Press. pp. 49–100. ISBN 9780199978618.
- Kleineberg, Andreas; Lelgemann, Dieter; Knobloch, Eberhard; Marx, Christian, eds. (2012). Germania und die Insel Thule: Die Entschlüsselung von Ptolemaios' "Atlas der Oikumene" (in German) (2 ed.). Wissenschaftliche Buchgesellschaft. ISBN 978-3534721795.
- Murdoch, Adrian (2004). "Germania Romana". In Murdoch, Brian; Read, Malcolm (eds.). Early Germanic Literature and Culture. Boydell & Brewer. pp. 55–73. ISBN 157113199X.
- Scardigli, Barbara (1998). "I. Geschichte. B. Germania (Provinzname) - Germania Magna" [I. History. B. Germania (Provincial Name) - Germania Magna]. In Beck, Heinrich; Geuenich, Dieter; Steuer, Heiko (eds.). Germanen, Germania, Germanische Altertumskunde [Germani, Germania, Germanic Antiquity]. Reallexikon der Germanischen Altertumskunde (in German). Vol. 11. Walter de Gruyter. pp. 245–257. ISBN 3110158329.
- James, Simon; Krmnicek, Stefan, eds. (2020). The Oxford Handbook of the Archaeology of Roman Germany. Oxford University Press. ISBN 978-0199665730.
- Todd, Malcolm (2004). The Early Germans (2nd ed.). Blackwell Publishing. ISBN 1-4051-1714-1.
- Wolfram, Herwig (1999). "Germanic Tribes". In Bowersock, G. W.; Brown, Peter; Grabar, Oleg (eds.). Late Antiquity: A Guide to the Postclassical World. Belknap Press. pp. 466–468. ISBN 0-674-51173-5.
- Wolfram, Herwig (2005). The Roman Empire and Its Germanic Peoples. University of California Press. ISBN 9780520244900.
