= Fritz Paul =

German philologist

- Born: 4 February 1942 (age 84); Nesselwang, Germany
- Died: 19 December 2025

Academic background
- Education: LMU Munich

Academic work
- Discipline: Germanic studies
- Sub-discipline: Scandinavian studies
- Institutions: Ruhr University Bochum; University of Göttingen
- Main interests: Scandinavian literature

Fritz Paul (4 April 1942 – 19 December 2025) was a German philologist who specializes in Scandinavian studies.

== Biography ==
Fritz Paul was born in Nesselwang, Germany on 4 April 1942. After gaining his abitur in Kempten in 1962, Paul studied German and Nordic philology at LMU Munich and the University of Oslo. He received his Ph.D. in 1968 with a thesis on the Norwegian writer Henrik Ibsen.

From 1968 to 1972, Paul was a research assistant at the Seminar for Nordic Philology and Germanic Antiquity at LMU Munich, where he completed his habilitation in Nordic philology in 1972. Paul was subsequently appointed a professor in Scandinavian studies at the Ruhr University Bochum. From 1979 to his retirement in 2007, Paul was a professor in Germanic and Nordic philology at the University of Göttingen. Paul is a specialist in both Old Norse literature and modern Scandinavian literature.

He is also a fellow of the Norwegian Academy of Science and Letters from 1994.

== See also ==
- Heinrich Beck
- Kurt Schier
- Klaus Düwel

== Selected works ==
- Symbol und Mythos. Studien zum Spätwerk Henrik Ibsens. München 1969 (= Münchener Universitätsschriften. Reihe der Philosophischen Fakultät. Bd. 6)
- Henrich Steffens. Naturphilosophie und Universalromantik. München 1973.
- August Strindberg. Stuttgart 1979 (= Sammlung Metzler. Bd. 178). ISBN 3-476-10178-9.
- (Hrsg.): Grundzüge der neueren skandinavischen Literaturen. Mit Beiträgen von Alken Bruns, Wolfgang Butt, Wilhelm Friese, Bernhard Glienke, Gert Kreutzer, Otto Oberholzer, Fritz Paul. Darmstadt 1982. (= Grundzüge. Bd. 41). 2. Aufl. Darmstadt 1991, ISBN 3-534-08047-5.
- Preise mit Sprengkraft. Skandinavien und seine Nobelpreise. Hannover 2000 (= Schriftenreihe des Niedersächsischen Landtages. Heft 38).
- Kleine Schriften zur nordischen Philologie. Wien 2003 (= Wiener Studien zur Skandinavistik. Bd. 9). ISBN 3-7069-0139-0.
- Zahlreiche Aufsätze zur skandinavischen und deutschen Literatur.

== Sources ==
- Kürschners Deutscher Gelehrten-Kalender 2009. 22. Ausg. K. G. Saur Verlag, München 2009, ISBN 978-3-598-23629-7.
