= Heinz Klingenberg (philologist) =

German philologist (1934–2018)

- Born: 9 October 1934; Nauen, Germany
- Died: 4 March 2018 (aged 83); Freiburg im Breisgau, Germany

Academic background
- Education: University of Freiburg
- Academic advisor: Siegfried Gutenbrunner

Academic work
- Discipline: Germanic studies
- Sub-discipline: Old Norse studies
- Institutions: University of Freiburg
- Main interests: Old Norse literature; Runology

Heinz Klingenberg (9 October 1934 – 4 March 2018) was a German philologist who specialized in Old Norse studies.

== Biography ==
Heinz Klingenberg was born in Nauen, Germany on 9 October 1934. He received his Ph.D. at the University of Freiburg in 1959, where he completed his habilitation in 1970. He was appointed an associate professor there in 1973. From 1979 until his retirement in 2000, Klingenberg was Professor of Scandinavian Studies at the University of Freiburg.

== See also ==
- Elmer H. Antonsen
- Heinrich Beck
- Rudolf Simek
- Robert Nedoma
- Klaus Böldl

== Selected works ==
- Festschrift Siegfried Gutenbrunner. 1972
- Runenschrift, Schriftdenken, Runeninschriften. 1973
- Edda, Sammlung und Dichtung. 1974
- Festschrift Otmar Werner. 1997
- Heidnisches Altertum und nordisches Mittelalter. Strukturbildende Perspektiven des Snorri Sturluson. 1999

== Sources ==
- Kürschners Deutscher Gelehrten-Kalender 2013. Bio- bibliographisches Verzeichnis deutschsprachiger Wissenschaftler der Gegenwart. 2. Teilband, De Gruyter, Berlin/Boston (25. Ausgabe) 2013, ISBN 978-3-11-027421-9. (Geistes- und Sozialwissenschaften)
- Bela Brogyanyi (Hrsg.): Germanisches Altertum und christliches Mittelalter. Festschrift für Heinz Klingenberg zum 65. Geburtstag. Kovač, Hamburg 2002, ISBN 3-8300-0387-0
