= Sigmund Oehrl =

German philologist

- Born: 21 November 1979 (age 46); Kassel, Germany

Academic background
- Education: University of Göttingen

Academic work
- Discipline: Germanic studies
- Sub-discipline: Old Norse studies
- Institutions: University of Göttingen; LMU Munich
- Main interests: Germanic religion; Petroglyphs; Picture stones; Runology

Benjamin Sigmund Oehrl (born 21 November 1979) is a German archaeologist and philologist who specializes in Germanic studies.

== Biography ==
Sigmund Oehrl was born in Kassel, Germany on 21 November 1979. He studied prehistory, protohistory, and German and Nordic philology at the University of Göttingen, gaining his master's degree with distinction in 2004. Oehrl subsequently worked as a research assistant at the Seminar for Prehistory and Protohistory at the University of Göttingen, and was in 2006 awarded a doctoral scholarship by the Gerda Henkel Stiftung. He received his Ph.D. summa cum laude from the University of Göttingen in 2008 with a thesis on runestones in Sweden.

From 2009 to 2014, Oehrl was a lecturer at the University of Göttingen and a researcher on runic at the Göttingen Academy of Sciences and Humanities. He transferred to LMU Munich in 2014, where he gained his habilitation on Old Norse philology and prehistoric archaeology in 2016. He has subsequently been a researcher and lecturer at LMU Munich and Stockholm University.

Oehrl researches a variety of subjects related to Germanic Antiquity, including Germanic religion, Germanic art, runology and petroglyphs. He is particularly known for his research on the picture stones of Gotland. He is a co-editor of Germanische Altertumskunde Online.

== See also ==
- Rudolf Simek
- Wilhelm Heizmann
- Robert Nedoma
- Klaus Düwel
- Arnulf Krause

== Selected works ==
- Sigmund Oehrl (2006), Zur Deutung anthropomorpher und theriomorpher Bilddarstellungen auf den spätwikingerzeitlichen Runensteinen Schwedens, Wiener Studien zur Skandinavistik 16 (in German), Wien
- Sigmund Oehrl (2011), Vierbeinerdarstellungen auf schwedischen Runensteinen. Studien zur nordgermanischen Fesselungsikonografie, Ergänzungsbände zum Reallexikon der Germanischen Altertumskunde 72 (in German), Berlin / New York
- Sigmund Oehrl (2012), Alexandra Pesch / Ruth Blankenfeldt (ed.), "Bildliche Darstellungen vom Schmied Wieland und ein unerwarteter Auftritt in Walhall", Goldsmith Mysteries – the Elusive Gold Smithies of the North. Archaeological, Pictorial and Documentary Evidence from the 1st Millennium AD in Northern Europe. Papers Presented at the Workshop Organized by the Centre for Baltic and Scandinavian Archaeology (ZBSA), Schleswig, June 20th and 21th, 2011, Schriften des Archäologischen Landesmuseums. Ergänzungsreihe 8 (in German), Neumünster: Wachholtz Verlag, pp. 279–335
- Sigmund Oehrl (2012), Jost Auler (ed.), ""do hengen die drei hunde" – Richtstätten und Tiere", Richtstättenarchäologie, Band III (in German), Dormagen, pp. 450–473
- Sigmund Oehrl (2014), Matthias Teichert (ed.), ""Beizjagd" auf den Rothirsch – Asiatische Jagdmethoden im Norden, keltische Vorbilder oder germanisches Jägerlatein?", Sport und Spiel bei den Germanen. Nordeuropa von der römischen Kaiserzeit bis zum Mittelalter, Ergänzungsbände zum Reallexikon der Germanischen Altertumskunde (in German), vol. 88, Berlin / Boston, pp. 481–535
- Sigmund Oehrl und Wilhelm Heizmann, ed. (2015), Bilddenkmäler zur germanischen Götter- und Heldensage, Ergänzungsbände zum Reallexikon der germanischen Altertumskunde 91 (in German), Berlin / Boston
- Sigmund Oehrl (2016), Matthias Egeler (ed.), "Die Kirche von Bro auf Gotland: Ein Fall von Kultplatzkontinuität?", Germanische Kultorte. Vergleichende, historische und rezeptionsgeschichtliche Zugänge, Münchner Nordistische Studien (in German), vol. 24, München, pp. 206–273
- Sigmund Oehrl (2017), "Der göttliche Schiffsbegleiter mit dem "Hörnerhelm". Ein bislang unbekanntes wikingerzeitliches Bildsteinfragment aus St. Valle im Kirchspiel Rute auf Gotland", Zeitschrift für deutsches Altertum und deutsche Literatur (in German), vol. 146, pp. 1–40
- Sigmund Oehrl (2019), Die Bildsteine Gotlands. Probleme und neue Wege ihrer Dokumentation, Lesung und Deutung, Studia archaeologiae medii aevi 3 (in German), Friedberg: Likias, ISBN 978-3-9820130-1-5, "zwei Bände: 418 Seiten und 347 Farbtafeln"
- Sigmund Oehrl (2019), Marion Bertram, Dieter Quast und Andreas Rau (ed.), "Die Runeninschrift auf dem Scheidenmundblech", Das Schwert mit dem goldenen Griff. Eine Prunkbestattung der Völkerwanderungszeit, Die Sammlungen des Museums für Vor- und Frühgeschichte 5 (in German), Regensburg: Schnell & Steiner, pp. 131–147
- Sigmund Oehrl (2019), "Re-Interpretations of Gotlandic Picture Stones Based on the Reflectance Transformation Imaging Method (RTI): Some Examples", in Klas Wikström af Edholm; Peter Jackson Rova; Andreas Nordberg; Olof Sundqvist; Torun Zachrisson (eds.), Myth, Materiality and Lived Religion: In Merovingian and Viking Scandinavia (in German), Stockholm: Stockholm University Press, pp. 141–185, doi:10.16993/bay.g, ISBN 9789176350997, S2CID 195561942
- Sigmund Oehrl, Klaus Düwel und Robert Nedoma, ed. (2020), Die Südgermanischen Runeninschriften, Ergänzungsbände zum Reallexikon der Germanischen Altertumskunde 119 (in German), Berlin / Boston

== Sources ==
- "Curriculum Vitae (Kurzform)". Sigmund Oehrl.
