= Hubert Fehr =

German archaeologist

Academic background
- Education: University of Freiburg

Academic work
- Discipline: Archaeology
- Institutions: Medieval archaeology

Hubert Fehr (born ca. 1970) is a German archaeologist. Fehr received his studied history, Roman archaeology and Medieval history at the University of Freiburg from 1991 to 1998. With financial support from the European Union, Fehr gained his PhD in 2003 with a thesis on relationships between the Germanic peoples and Romans under the Merovingian dynasty. His thesis was published as a supplement to the Reallexikon der Germanischen Altertumskunde.

== Selected works ==
- Germanen und Romanen im Merowingerreich, 2010

== See also ==
- Sebastian Brather
- Heiko Steuer

== Sources ==
- "Wissenschaftlicher Werdegang Dr. Hubert Fehr". University of Freiburg.
