= Norbert Wagner (philologist) =

German philologist (1929–2023)

- Born: 12 February 1929; Straubing, Germany
- Died: 27 December 2023 (aged 94); Würzburg, Germany

Academic background
- Education: University of Würzburg
- Doctoral advisor: Franz Rolf Schröder
- Other advisors: Ernst Schwarz; Otto Basler; Manfred Mayrhofer; Kurt Ruh

Academic work
- Discipline: Germanic studies
- Institutions: University of Würzburg
- Main interests: Germanic Antiquity; Germanic languages; Germanic religion; Goths

Norbert Wagner (12 February 1929 – 27 December 2023) was a German philologist who specializes in Germanic studies.

== Biography ==
Norbert Wagner was born in Straubing, Germany on 12 February 1929. After gaining his abitur in 1947, Wagner studied German philology under Ernst Schwarz, and also history and English, at the University of Regensburg. Wagner transferred to the Ludwig-Maximilians-Universität München in 1948, where he studied under Otto Basler and other scholars. Wagner received his Ph.D. in 1955 at the University of Würzburg under the supervision of Franz Rolf Schröder. His thesis was on the Völsunga saga.

After gaining his Ph.D., Wagner took courses in Indo-European studies and Indology under Manfred Mayrhofer, and worked as a research assistant in the Department for Ancient Germanic Studies. Wagner completed his habilitation at Würzburg in 1967 under the supervision of Kurt Ruh. His thesis on Getica and the early history of the Goths was published in 1967. Wagner subsequently served as Professor at the Institute for German Philology at the University of Würzburg. He retired from his duties in 1997, but has continued to teach and research. Wagner specializes in Germanic philology and Germanic Antiquity, particularly onomastics and Gothic language, literature and history.

== See also ==
- Heinrich Beck
- Rudolf Simek
- Robert Nedoma
- Klaus Böldl

== Selected works ==
- Studien zu den ersten Kapiteln der Volsunga saga (Kapitel 2-8, 10-12), Universität Würzburg 1955.
- Getica. Untersuchungen zum Leben des Jordanes und zur frühen Geschichte der Goten, de Gruyter, Berlin 1967.
- Zahlreiche Beiträge in Fachperiodika, besonders in: Beiträge zur Namenforschung und Historische Sprachforschung.

== Sources ==
- Kürschners Gelehrten-Kalender 2009. K. G. Saur Verlag, München 2009
