= Horní Maxov (Lučany nad Nisou) =

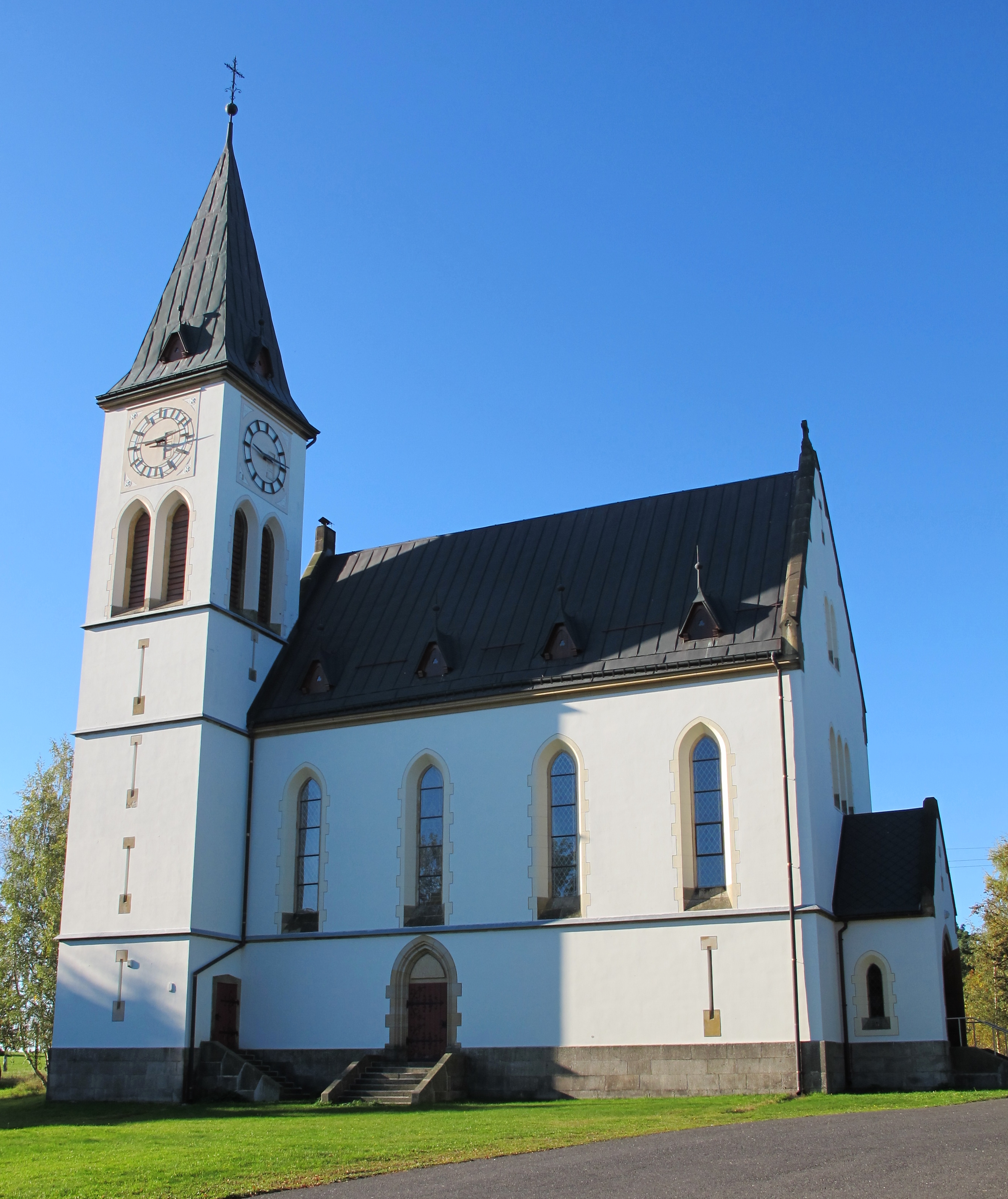
- A church in Horni Maxov

- Location within Czech Republic
- Coordinates: 50°45′51″N 15°12′56″E
- Country: Czech Republic
- District: Jablonec nad Nisou
- Town: Lučany nad Nisou

Area
  - Total: 2.64 km^{2} (1.02 sq mi)

Population (2012)
  - Total: 138
  - Density: 52.3/km^{2} (135/sq mi)
- Time zone: UTC+1 (CET)
  - Summer (DST): UTC+2 (CEST)
- Postal code: 468 44

Horní Maxov (German Ober Maxdorf) is a village in the town of Lučany nad Nisou in Jablonec nad Nisou District. It can be found roughly 2 km (1.2 mi) northwest from Lučany nad Nisou. As of 2008, there were 157 addresses registered here. In 2001, the village had 138 inhabitants. It lies between the Maxovski ridge and the Bramberk observation tower on Krásný Hill, 797 m (2,615 ft). The highest peak of Horní Maxov is Slovanka, 820 m (2,690 ft), part of the Maxovski ridge.

== Number of inhabitants of Maxov from 1719 until 2001 ==
Historical population
Year	Pop.	±%
1719	15	—
1720	200	+1233.3%
1770	450	+125.0%
1800	800	+77.8%
1899	1,400	+75.0%
1902	1,205	−13.9%
1921	1,006	−16.5%
1939	917	−8.8%
2001	138	−85.0%
