= Kurt Schier =

German philologist (1929–2023)

- Born: 27 February 1929; Ober-Maxdorf, Czechoslovakia
- Died: 19 August 2023 (aged 94); Deisenhofen, Bavaria, Germany

Academic background
- Education: Ludwig-Maximilians-Universität München (LMU)
- Doctoral advisor: Friedrich von der Leyen

Academic work
- Discipline: Germanic studies
- Sub-discipline: Old Norse studies
- Institutions: Ludwig-Maximilians-Universität München (LMU)
- Notable students: Wilhelm Heizmann
- Main interests: Germanic Antiquity; Old Norse literature; Norse mythology

Kurt Schier (27 February 1929 – 19 August 2023) was a German philologist who specialised in Germanic studies.

== Biography ==
Kurt Schier was born in the village of Ober-Maxdorf, near modern-day Jablonec nad Nisou, Czech Republic. From 1949, Schier studied German and Nordic languages and literature, English studies, ethnology, and history at the Ludwig-Maximilians-Universität München (LMU), receiving his Ph.D. in 1955 under the supervision of Friedrich von der Leyen. He habilitated in Nordic philology and Germanic Antiquity at LMU in 1971 with a thesis on Norse mythology. From 1975 until his retirement in 1995, Schier was Chair of Nordic Philology and Head of the Department for Germanic Antiquity at LMU.

Schier died on 19 August 2023, at the age of 94.

== See also ==
- Heinrich Beck (philologist)
- Otto Höfler

== Selected works ==
- With Hugo Kuhn (ed.): Märchen, Mythos, Dichtung. Festschrift zum 90. Geburtstag Friedrich von der Leyens am 19. August 1963. Beck, Munich 1963.
- Sagaliteratur, Metzler, Stuttgart, 1970 (Sammlung Metzler, section D, vol. 78).
- Die Saga von Egil (= Saga. Bd. 1). Edited and translated from Old Icelandic by Kurt Schier. Diederichs, Düsseldorf u. a. 1978, ISBN 3-424-00521-5.
- Nordlichter. Ausgewählte Schriften 1960–1992, Diederichs, Munich, 1994, ISBN 3-424-01204-1 (with bibliography, pp. 326–333).
- Egils Saga. Die Saga von Egil Skalla-Grimsson. Edited and translated from Old Icelandic by Kurt Schier. Diederichs, Munich, 1996, ISBN 3-424-01262-9.

== Sources ==
- Wilhelm Heizmann (Hrsg.): Analecta septentrionalia. Beiträge zur nordgermanischen Kultur- und Literaturgeschichte [gewidmet Kurt Schier zu seinem 80. Geburtstag], de Gruyter, Berlin 2009 (Ergänzungsbände zum Reallexikon der germanischen Altertumskunde, Band 65), ISBN 978-3-11-021869-5.
