= Astrid van Nahl =

German philologist

- Born: 1951 (age 74–75); Schweinfurt, Germany

Academic background
- Education: University of Bonn
- Doctoral advisor: Heinrich Beck

Academic work
- Discipline: Germanic studies
- Institutions: University of Bonn
- Main interests: Germanic Antiquity; Old Norse literature

Astrid van Nahl (born 1951) is a German philologist, writer, and editor who specializes in Scandinavian studies.

== Biography ==
Astrid van Nahl was born in Schweinfurt, Germany in 1951. She received her Ph.D. in Old Norse literature at the University of Bonn in 1980 under the supervision of Heinrich Beck. She subsequently worked as a research assistant at numerous universities, eventually becoming Lecturer at the University of Bonn. She is also a researcher at the University of Uppsala. van Nahl is closely associated with the Göttingen Academy of Sciences and Humanities, and a contributor of several articles to the Reallexikon der Germanischen Altertumskunde. van Nahl was involved with the establishment of the Germanische Altertumskunde Online. She is a chief editor at De Gruyter and the founder and editor of the magazine Alliteratus.

== Selected works ==
- Originale Riddarasögur als Teil altnordischer Sagaliteratur. Dissertation an der Philos. Fak. der Uni Bonn 1980. Lang Verlag, Frankfurt am Main – Bern 1981, ISBN 3-8204-7082-4.
- Sprachführer Isländisch. Zusammen mit Ríta Duppler. Helmut Buske Verlag, Hamburg 1995, ISBN 3-87548-061-9.
- Einführung in die Rezensionsarbeit am PC. Zusammen mit Jan van Nahl. Materialien Jugendliteratur und Medien, H. 45. Gewerkschaft Erziehung und Wissenschaft, Arbeitsgemeinschaft Jugendliteratur und Medien, Überlingen 2002
- Einführung in das Altisländische. Ein Lehr- und Lesebuch. Helmut Buske Verlag, Hamburg 2003, ISBN 3-87548-329-4.
- Langenscheidts Praktisches Lehrbuch Isländisch. Ein Standardwerk für Anfänger. Zusammen mit Ríta Duppler. Langenscheidt Verlag, Berlin u. a. 2010 (11. Auflage), ISBN 978-3-468-26170-1.
- Isländisch – Ein Lehrbuch für Anfänger und Fortgeschrittene. Zusammen mit Ríta Duppler. Helmut Buske Verlag, Hamburg 2013, ISBN 978-3-87548-660-5; 2. überarbeitete Aufl. 2015, ISBN 978-3-87548-736-7.
- Einführung in das Altisländische. Ein Lehr- und Lesebuch. Helmut Buske Verlag, Hamburg 2014 (2., überarbeitete und erweiterte Auflage), ISBN 978-3-87548-704-6.
- Sprachreiseführer Isländisch. Zusammen mit Jan Alexander van Nahl. Helmut Buske Verlag, Hamburg 2017, ISBN 978-3-87548-838-8.
- Die Frau, der Hitler das rosa Kaninchen stahl. Erste Biographie über Judith Kerr. wbg Theiss in Wissenschaftliche Buchgesellschaft, Darmstadt 2019. ISBN 978-3-8062-3929-4.
- Skandinavistische Mediävistik. Einführung in die altwestnordische Sprach- und Literaturgeschichte. Zusammen mit Jan Alexander van Nahl. Helmut Buske Verlag, Hamburg 2019, ISBN 978-3-87548-967-5.
