= Arnulf Krause =

German philologist (born 1955)

- Born: 27 November 1955 (age 70); Zell im Wiesental, West Germany

Academic background
- Education: University of Bonn
- Academic advisor: Heinrich Beck

Academic work
- Discipline: Germanic studies
- Sub-discipline: Old Norse studies
- Institutions: University of Bonn
- Main interests: Celts; Early Germanic literature; Germanic peoples; Germanic religion; Vikings

Arnulf Krause (born 27 November 1955) is a German philologist who specializes in Germanic studies.

== Biography ==
Arnulf Krause was born in Zell im Wiesental, Germany. He received his Ph.D. at the University of Bonn in 1989. He is a professor of Old Norse language and literature at the University of Bonn, where he also lectures in Germanic studies. Krause specializes in early Germanic literature and religion. He is the author of numerous books about Germanic peoples, Celts and Vikings.

== See also ==
- Rudolf Simek
- Wilhelm Heizmann
- Robert Nedoma

== Selected works ==
=== Monographs ===
- Die Dichtung des Eyvindr Skáldaspillir. Literaturverlag Norden Rheinhardt, Leverkusen 1990, ISBN 3-927153-21-4 (= Dissertation).
- Die Geschichte der Germanen. Campus, Frankfurt/Main 2002, ISBN 3-593-36885-4.
- Die Welt der Kelten. Geschichte und Mythos eines rätselhaften Volkes. Campus, Frankfurt/Main 2004, ISBN 3-593-37311-4.
- Die Welt der Wikinger. Campus, Frankfurt/Main 2006, ISBN 3-593-37783-7.
- Europa im Mittelalter. Wie die Zeit der Kreuzzüge unsere moderne Gesellschaft prägt. Campus, Frankfurt/Main 2008, ISBN 978-3-593-38507-5.
- Von Göttern und Helden. Die mythische Welt der Kelten, Germanen und Wikinger. Theiss, Stuttgart 2010, ISBN 978-3-8062-2163-3.
- Lexikon der germanischen Mythologie und Heldensage. Reclam, Stuttgart 2010, ISBN 978-3-15-010778-2.
- Die wirkliche Mittelerde. Tolkiens Mythologie und ihre Wurzeln im Mittelalter. Theiss, Stuttgart 2012, ISBN 978-3-8062-2478-8.
- Der Kampf um Freiheit. Die Napoleonischen Freiheitskriege in Deutschland. Konrad Theiss Verlag, Darmstadt 2013, ISBN 978-3-8062-2498-6.
- Runen. Geschichte – Gebrauch – Bedeutung. Marix Verlag, Wiesbaden 2017, ISBN 978-3-7374-1056-4

=== Translations ===
- Die Edda des Snorri Sturluson. Ausgewählt, übersetzt und kommentiert von Arnulf Krause. Reclam, Stuttgart 1997, ISBN 3-15-000782-8.
- Die Heldenlieder der Älteren Edda. Übersetzt, kommentiert und herausgegeben von Arnulf Krause. Reclam, Stuttgart 2001, ISBN 3-15-018142-9.
- Die Götter- und Heldenlieder der älteren Edda. Übersetzt, kommentiert und herausgegeben von Arnulf Krause. Reclam, Stuttgart 2004, ISBN 3-15-050047-8.
- Die Götterlieder der Älteren Edda. Übersetzt, kommentiert und herausgegeben von Arnulf Krause. Reclam, Stuttgart 2006, ISBN 3-15-018426-6.
- Die Weisheit der Wikinger. Insel-Verlag, Berlin 2011, ISBN 978-3-458-35741-4.

== Sources ==
- Kürschners Deutscher Gelehrten-Kalender 2012. (24. Ausgabe). De Gruyter, Berlin 2011, ISBN 978-3-11-023525-8. (Geistes- und Sozialwissenschaften)
