= Klaus Böldl =

German philologist

- Born: 21 February 1964 (age 62); Passau, West Germany

Academic background
- Education: LMU Munich

Academic work
- Discipline: Germanic philology
- Sub-discipline: Old Norse studies
- Institutions: Kiel University
- Main interests: Old Norse literature; Old Norse religion

Klaus Böldl (born 21 February 1964) is a German philologist who specializes in Old Norse studies. Böldl was born in Passau and studied Nordic philology, German philology and comparative literature at LMU Munich and Lund University. Böldl received his Ph.D. in philology at LMU in 1999, where he completed his habilitation in 2005. Since 2007, Böldl has been Professor of Scandinavian Medieval Studies at the Nordic Institute of Kiel University.

Böldl is a member of the Akademie der Wissenschaften und der Literatur. He is a recipient of many awards, including the Toucan Prize (1997), the Brothers Grimm Prize of the City of Hanau (2003), the Hermann-Hesse-Literaturpreis (2003) and the Friedrich-Hebbel-Preis (2013).

== Selected works ==
- Studie in Kristallbildung. Frankfurt am Main, 1997. ISBN 3-596-22389-X.
- (Translator) Die Saga von den Leuten auf Eyr. Munich, 1999. (= Eyrbyggja saga) ISBN 3-424-01480-X.
- Südlich von Abisko. Frankfurt am Main, 2000. ISBN 3-596-14979-7.
- Der Mythos der Edda. Tübingen [u. a.], 2000. ISBN 3-7720-2749-0.
- Die fernen Inseln. Frankfurt am Main, 2003. ISBN 3-10-007620-6. (über die Färöer und Island)
- (Co-editor with Uwe Englert) Vereinzelt Schneefall. Neue Texte aus Skandinavien, in: Neue Rundschau Jhg. 115, Heft 3. Frankfurt am Main, 2004. ISBN 3-10-809058-5.
- (Co-editor with Miriam Kauko) Kontinuität in der Kritik. Historische und aktuelle Perspektiven der Skandinavistik. Freiburg, 2005. ISBN 3-7930-9379-4.
- Drei Flüsse. Frankfurt am Main, 2006. ISBN 3-10-007621-4.
- Der nächtliche Lehrer. Frankfurt am Main, 2010. ISBN 978-3-10-007627-4.
- (Editor) Isländersagas, S.Fischer Verlag, Frankfurt am Main 2011 ISBN 978-3-10-007629-8.
- Götter und Mythen des Nordens. Ein Handbuch. Verlag C. H. Beck, Munich 2013, ISBN 978-3-406-65219-6.
- Der Atem der Vögel. Frankfurt am Main, 2017. ISBN 978-3-10-397270-2.

== See also ==
- Wilhelm Heizmann
- Heinrich Beck
- Rudolf Simek
- Robert Nedoma
