= Heinz Klingenberg =

Heinz Klingenberg may refer to:

- Heinz Klingenberg (actor) (1905–1959), German actor
- Heinz Klingenberg (philologist) (born 1934), German philologist
