= Jindřichov =

Jindřichov may refer to places in the Czech Republic:

- Jindřichov (Bruntál District), a municipality and village in the Moravian-Silesian Region
- Jindřichov (Přerov District), a municipality and village in the Olomouc Region
- Jindřichov (Šumperk District), a municipality and village in the Olomouc Region
- Jindřichov, a village and part of Cheb in the Karlovy Vary Region
- Jindřichov (Lučany nad Nisou), a village and part of Lučany nad Nisou in the Liberec Region
- Jindřichov, a village and part of Velká Bíteš in the Vysočina Region

== See also ==
- Jindřichovice (disambiguation)
