= Etymology of Norway =

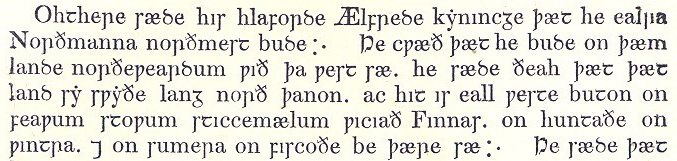
Opening of Ohthere's Old English account, translated: "Ohthere told his lord king Ælfred that he lived northmost of all Norwegians…"

Norway has two official names: Norge in Bokmål and Noreg in Nynorsk. The English name Norway comes from the Old English word Norþweg mentioned in 880, meaning "northern way" or "way leading to the north", which is how the Anglo-Saxons referred to the coastline of Atlantic Norway similar to a leading theory about the origin of the Norwegian language name. The Anglo-Saxons of Britain also referred to the kingdom of Norway in 880 as Norðmanna land.

== Origin debates ==
There is some disagreement about whether the native name of Norway originally had the same etymology as the English form. According to the traditional dominant view, the first component was originally norðr, a cognate of English north, so the full name was Norðr vegr, "the way northwards", referring to the sailing route along the Norwegian coast, and contrasting with suðrvegar "southern way" (from Old Norse suðr) for (Germany), and austrvegr "eastern way" (from austr) for the Baltic. In the translation of Orosius for Alfred, the name is Norðweg, while in younger Old English sources the ð is gone. In the tenth century many Norsemen settled in Northern France, according to the sagas, in the area that was later called Normandy from norðmann (Norseman or Scandinavian), although not a Norwegian possession. In France normanni or northmanni referred to people of Norway, Sweden or Denmark. Until around 1800, inhabitants of Western Norway were referred to as nordmenn (northmen) while inhabitants of Eastern Norway were referred to as austmenn (east men).

According to another theory, the first component was a word nór, meaning "narrow" (Old English nearu), referring to the inner-archipelago sailing route through the land ("narrow way"). The interpretation as "northern", as reflected in the English and Latin forms of the name, would then have been due to later folk etymology. This latter view originated with philologist Niels Halvorsen Trønnes in 1847; since 2016 it is also advocated by language student and activist Klaus Johan Myrvoll and was adopted by philology professor Michael Schulte. The form Nore is still used in placenames such as the village of Nore and lake Norefjorden in Buskerud county, and still has the same meaning. Among other arguments in favour of the theory, it is pointed out that the word has a long vowel in Skaldic poetry and is not attested with <ð> in any native Norse texts or inscriptions (the earliest runic attestations have the spellings nuruiak and nuriki). This resurrected theory has received some pushback by other scholars on various grounds, e. g. the uncontroversial presence of the element norðr in the ethnonym norðrmaðr "Norseman, Norwegian person" (modern Norwegian nordmann), and the adjective norrǿnn "northern, Norse, Norwegian", as well as the very early attestations of the Latin and Anglo-Saxon forms with "th".

== Related names ==
In a Latin manuscript of 840, the name Northuagia is mentioned. King Alfred's edition of the Orosius World History (dated 880), uses the term Norðweg. A French chronicle of c. 900 uses the names Northwegia and Norwegia. When Ohthere of Hålogaland visited King Alfred the Great in England in the end of the ninth century, the land was called Norðwegr (lit. "Northway") and norðmanna land (lit. "Northmen's land"). According to Ohthere, Norðmanna lived along the Atlantic coast, the Danes around Skagerrak og Kattegat, while the Sámi people (the "Fins") had a nomadic lifestyle in the wide interior. Ohthere told Alfred that he was "the most northern of all Norwegians", presumably at Senja island or closer to Tromsø. He also said that beyond the wide wilderness in Norway's southern part was the land of the Swedes, "Svealand".

The adjective Norwegian, recorded from c. 1600, is derived from the latinisation of the name as Norwegia; in the adjective Norwegian, the Old English spelling '-weg' has survived.
