= Johannes Hoops =

German philologist (1865–1949)

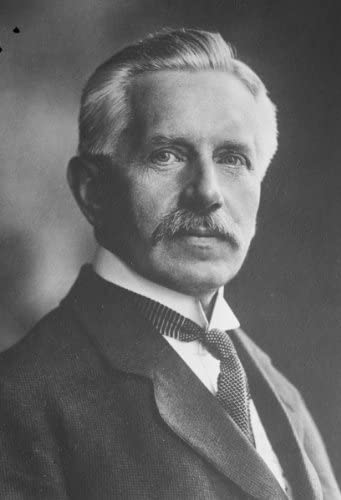
- Born: 20 July 1865; Bremen, Germany
- Died: 14 April 1949 (aged 83); Heidelberg, Germany

Academic background
- Education: University of Jena; University of Freiburg

Academic work
- Discipline: Germanic philology
- Institutions: University of Tübingen; University of Heidelberg
- Main interests: Germanic Antiquity
- Notable works: Reallexikon der Germanischen Altertumskunde (1911-1919)

Johannes Hoops (born 20 July 1865 - 14 April 1949) was a German philologist who was Professor of English philology at the University of Heidelberg. He is best known as the publisher of the first edition of the Reallexikon der Germanischen Altertumskunde (1911-1919).

== Biography ==
Johannes Hoops was born in Bremen, Kingdom of Hanover on 20 July 1865. He initially studied mathematics and the natural sciences at the universities of Jena and Freiburg, and philology and business. He gained his PhD at the University of Freiburg in 1889 with a dissertation on Old English plant names. Hoops taught at the University of Tübingen from 1893 to 1896. Since 1896, Hoops was Associate Professor, and from 1902 Professor, of English philology at the University of Heidelberg. Throughout his career, Hoops was the editor of several journals on English philology. Hoops became a member of the Heidelberg Academy of Sciences and Humanities in 1932, and a Corresponding Member of the Prussian Academy of Sciences in 1939. Following World War II, Hoops briefly served as Rector at the University of Heidelberg.

The research of Hoops centered on ancient botany, Beowulf and Germanic Antiquity. Hoops was the publisher of the first edition of the Reallexikon der Germanischen Altertumskunde (1911-1919).

== See also ==
- Rudolf Much
- Hermann Paul

== Sources ==
- Beck, Heinrich (2000). "Hoops". Reallexikon der Germanischen Altertumskunde (in German). Vol. 15. Walter de Gruyter. pp. 109–111. ISBN 3110166496.
