= Nesselwang =

- Municipality
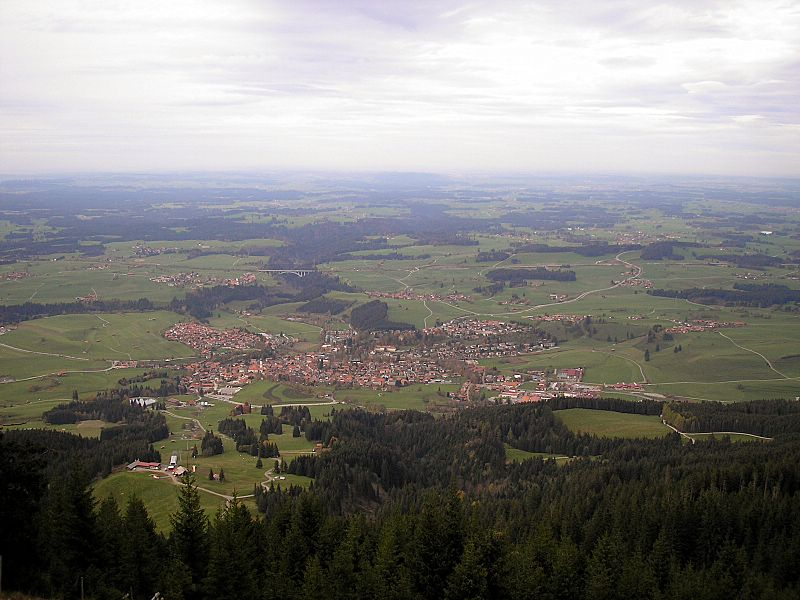
- Nesselwang

- Coat of arms

- Location of Nesselwang within Ostallgäu district
- Interactive map of Nesselwang
- Location within Germany Location within Bavaria
- Coordinates: 47°37′N 10°30′E
- Country: Germany
- State: Bavaria
- Admin. region: Schwaben
- District: Ostallgäu

Government
  - Mayor (2020–26): Pirmin Joas (CSU)

Area
  - Total: 29.54 km^{2} (11.41 sq mi)
- Elevation: 867 m (2,844 ft)

Population (2025-12-31)
  - Total: 3,749
  - Density: 126.9/km^{2} (328.7/sq mi)
- Time zone: UTC+01:00 (CET)
  - Summer (DST): UTC+02:00 (CEST)
- Postal codes: 87484
- Dialling codes: 08361
- Vehicle registration: OAL
- Website: www.nesselwang.de

Nesselwang (German pronunciation: [ˈnɛsl̩vaŋ]) is a municipality in the district of Ostallgäu in Bavaria in Germany. It is a frequently photographed market town and tourist resort at the foot of the Alps in Allgäu. It consists of the market (Nesselwang) as well as 17 surrounding hamlets (Gschwend, Hörich, Reichenbach, Bayerstetten, Wank, Hertingen, Attlesee, Schneidbach, Hammerschmiede, Lachen, Niederhöfen, Rindegg, Thal, Schicken, Schneidbach, Voglen and Widdumhof).

== History ==
In Roman times there was a road connecting Via Claudia Augusta with the Roman town of Cambodunum (Kempten). This road passed through the area now occupied by Nesselwang, however there is no evidence of Roman occupation in the town.

In 1059, the Emperor Heinrich IV borrowed from the Bishop of Augsburg with the area including Nesselwang as security. This loan was not paid back and so the area became part of the estates of the Bishop of Augsburg.

The first mention of Nesselwang was in 1302, in the form Nesselwach, although both the settlement and the name are probably older than this. The castle in the south of Nesselwang was maybe already built in the 11th century but the name Nesselburg was first mentioned in 1302.

The town received the right to hold a market from King Sigismund in 1429. The document conferring this right is now in the Bavarian State Archive in Munich. In 1582, Nesselwang received its own coat of arms and seal from Bishop Marquard from Berg. This allowed the town to seal documents and is an indices for a certain amount of self-government under the rule of the Augsburger Bishops.

In the years between 1500 and 1800 the history of Nesselwang was continuously effected by the wars then being fought in Europe. A quote from the owner of the Hotel Bären in 1796 is seen as expressing the general feeling during this time, It could be translated as „Please God, let things soon be different!“

In 1803, Nesslewang passed from the Bishop of Augsburg to the Kingdom of Bavaria.

In 1869, the town received the right for full self-government with a mayor and town council, a right which is still extant in the present day.

== Tourism ==
The town and surrounding hamlets are home to some 3,600 people and are visited by about 73,000 holiday guests each year. During the winter the town is a ski resort with the lifts of the Alpspitzbahn starting directly in the town and carrying skiers nearly to the top of the Alpspitz.

== People ==
- Heinrich von Knöringen (1570-1646), German Roman-Catholic bishop
- Maximilian von Lingg (1842-1930), German Roman-Catholic bishop
- Ludwig Böck (1902-1960), German skier
- Helmut Böck (1931-2025), German skier
- Fritz Paul (1942-2025), German philologist
