= Slovanka =

Hill in the central Jizera Mountains, Czech Republic

Slovanka (CZ)
- Seibthübel (DE)
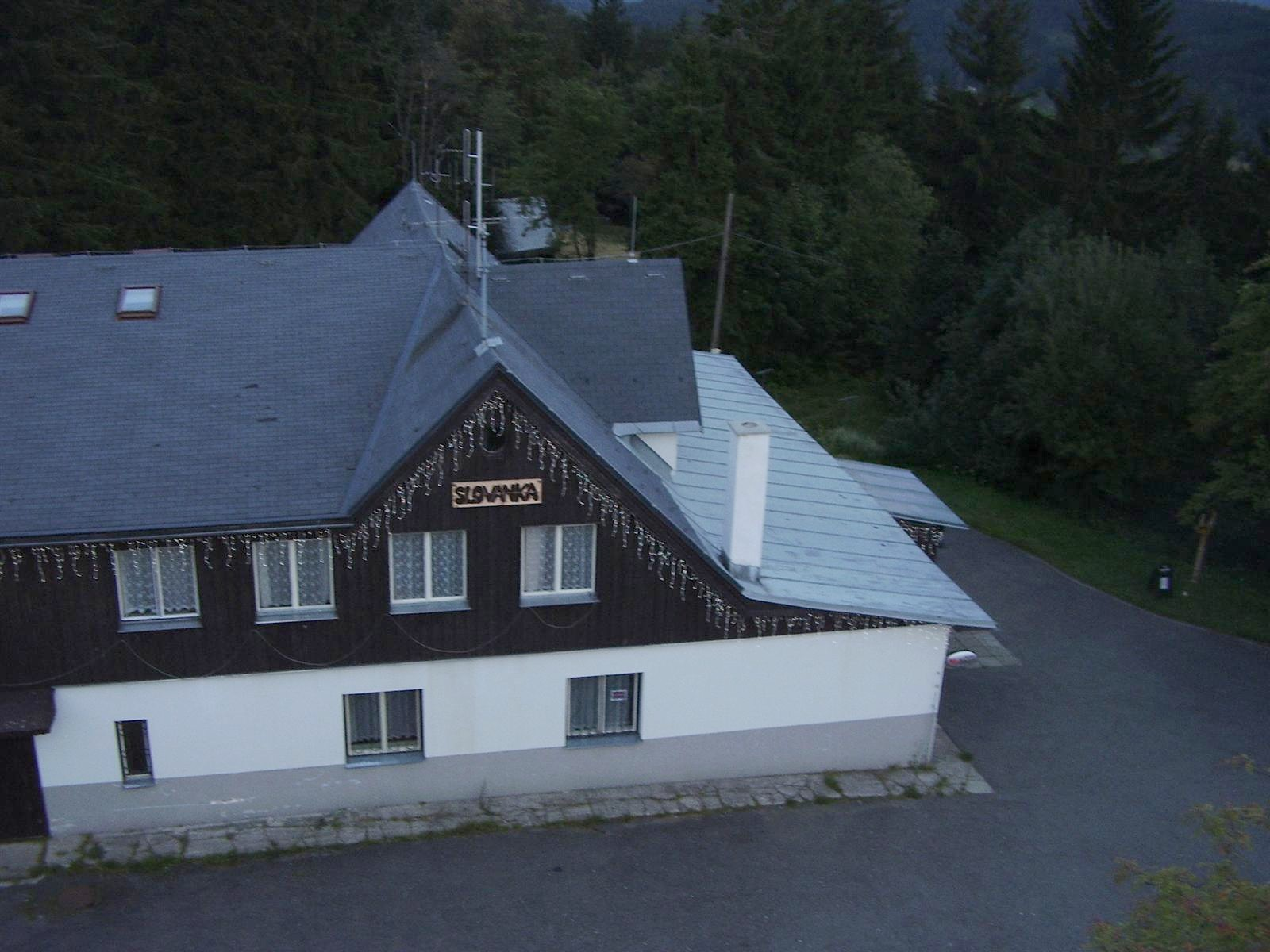
- Chalet Slovanka

Highest point
- Elevation: 820 m (2,690 ft)
- Coordinates: 50°46′24″N 15°11′47″E

Geography
- Location: Czech-German borderland
- Parent range: Jizera Mountains

Slovanka (German: Seibthübel) is a hill situated 820 m above sea level in the central Jizera Mountains in the area of Lučany nad Nisou, between Královka and Bramberk, in the Czech Republic.

There is an observation tower in the settlement, which was built in 1887. It is primarily made from iron and is 14 metres high, with 56 steps to the top. It was rebuilt for 550.000 Kč and reopened on 5 July 2000.

== See also ==
- Bramberk
