= Jindřichovice =

Jindřichovice may refer to places in the Czech Republic:

- Jindřichovice (Jihlava District), a municipality and village in the Vysočina Region
- Jindřichovice (Sokolov District), a municipality and village in the Karlovy Vary Region
- Jindřichovice, a village and part of Blatná in the South Bohemian Region
- Jindřichovice, a village and part of Kolinec in the Plzeň Region
- Jindřichovice pod Smrkem, a municipality and village in the Liberec Region

== See also ==
- Jindřichov (disambiguation)
