= Helmut Böck =

German Nordic combined skier (1931–2025)

Helmut Böck (14 February 1931 – 29 August 2025) was a West German Nordic skier in the 1950s.

Böck was German Nordic combined champion in 1955. He finished 19th in the Nordic combined event at the 1956 Winter Olympics in Cortina d'Ampezzo. Böck also competed in the 18 km event at the 1952 Winter Olympics in Oslo, but did not finish.

He was born in Nesselwang. His father was Olympian Ludwig Böck who competed at the 1928 Winter Olympics. After his active career he co-ordinated the construction of the ski and biathlon stadium in Nesselwang. He was the president of Skiclub Nesselwang in 2007. He died in Nesselwang on 29 August 2025, at the age of 94.
