= Ernst Schwarz (philologist) =

German philologist

- Born: 19 June 1895; Haida, Austria-Hungary
- Died: 14 April 1983 (aged 87); Buckenhof, Germany
- Awards: Bavarian Order of Merit

Academic background
- Education: University of Prague

Academic work
- Discipline: Germanic philology
- Institutions: Charles University; University of Erlangen–Nuremberg
- Notable students: Norbert Wagner

Ernst Schwarz (19 June 1895 – 14 April 1983) was an Austro-Hungarian-born German philologist who was Professor of Ancient German language and Literature at Charles University, and later Professor of Germanic and German Philology at the University of Erlangen–Nuremberg. Schwarz specialized in Germanic studies, especially dialectology and onomastics, with a particular focus on the Sudeten Germans.

== Biography ==
Moritz Schönfeld was born in Haida, Austria-Hungary on 19 June 1895. He was the son of glass exporter Franz Schwarz. After graduating from gymnasium in Böhmisch-Leipa in 1914, Schwarz studied German, history and geography at the University of Prague. During World War I, Schwarz served in the Austro-Hungarian Army. After the war, he resumed his studies. Schwarz received his doctorate and passed the state examination for German, history and geography in 1920, after which he worked as a teacher in Chomutov.

Since 1921, Schwarz worked as a professor at a commercial academy in Jablonec nad Nisou. He completed his habilitation in German philology at Charles University in 1923. Since 1930, Schwarz served as Associate Professor, and from 1935, Professor of Ancient German Language and Literature at Charles University. From 1939 to 1941, Schwarz was Dean of the Philological Faculty at Charles University. During this time, Schwarz headed a number of research projects on the language and history of Sudeten Germans. He was a member of the Historische Kommission für Schlesien, and from 1939 to 1945 Co-Editor of the Zeitschrift für Sudetendeutsche Geschichte.

Schwarz was expelled from Czechoslovakia in 1948, and subsequently worked as a primary school teacher in Pirna, while lecturing at the Philosophisch-theologische Hochschule Regensburg. From 1955 to 1963, Schwarz was Professor of Germanic and German Philology at the University of Erlangen–Nuremberg. During this time, Schwarz founded what is known as the Erlanger School of dialectology and onomastics. He was a prominent member of the number of scholarly organizations and commissions, and a co-founder of the Collegium Carolinum. He received the Bavarian Order of Merit in 1964, and the Georg Dehio Cultural Prize in 1970.

== Selected works ==
- Die Ortsnamen des östlichen Oberösterreich, 1920
- Unsere Mundart, 1927
- Die Ortsnamen der Sudetenländer als Geschichtsquelle, 1931
- Sudetendeutsche Sprachräume, 1935
- Sudetendeutsches Flurnamenbuch, 1935-1941
- Die volksgeschichtlichen Grundlagen der Iglauer Volksinsel, 1943
- Deutsche Namenforschung, 1949-1950
- Deutsche Mundartforschung, 1950-1951
- Deutsche und Germanische Philologie, 1951
- Goten, Nordgermanen, Angelsachsen, 1951
- Sudetendeutsches Wörterbuch
- Die Herkunft der Alemannen. Grundfragen der Alemannischen Geschichte, 1952
- Germanische Stammeskunde, 1956
- Sudetendeutsche Familiennamen aus vorhussitischer Zeit, 1957
- Die Herkunft der Siebenbürger und Zipser Sachsen, Ostmitteldeutsche, Rheinländer im Spiegel der Mundarten, 1957
- Sudetendeutscher Wortatlas, 1954-1958
- Atlas zur Geschichte der Deutschen Ostsiedlung, 1958
- Sprache und Siedlung in Nordostbayern, 1960
- Volkstumsgeschichte der Sudetenländer, 1961-1965
- Volkstumsgeschichte der Sudetenländer, 1965-1966
- Germanische Stammeskunde zwischen den Wissenschaften, 1967
- Kurze deutsche Wortgeschichte, 1982
- Der Ackermann aus Böhmen des Johannes von Tepl und seine Zeit, 1968
- Zur germanischen Stammeskunde : Aufsätze zum neuen Forschungsstand, 1972
- Sudetendeutsche Familiennamen des 15. und 16. Jahrhunderts, 1973
- Probleme der Namenforschung im deutschsprachigen Raum, 1977

== See also ==
- Jan de Vries (philologist)
- Moritz Schönfeld

== Sources ==
- Jahrbuch für fränkische Landesforschung 20/21 (1960/61)
- Bohemia Jahrbücher 6 (1965) and 16 (1975)
- Horst Haider Munske: Nachruf auf Ernst Schwarz. Zeitschrift für Bayerische Landesgeschichte (ZBLG) 47 (1984) 907–910.
