= Ludwig Böck =

German cross-country skier (1902–1960)

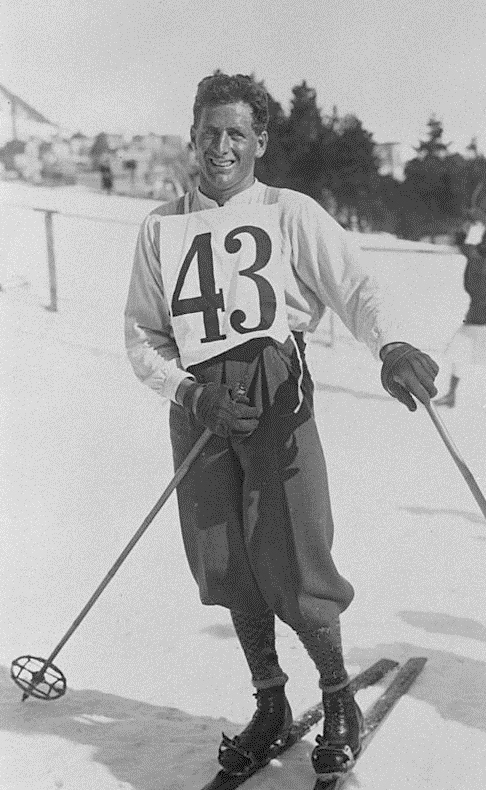
- Ludwig Böck at the 1928 Olympics

Personal information
- Born: 7 September 1902 Nesselwang, Germany
- Died: 14 March 1960 (aged 57) Nesselwang, West Germany

Sport
- Sport: Cross-country skiing
- Club: Skiklub Nesselwang

Ludwig Böck (7 September 1902 – 14 March 1960) was a German skier. He competed at the 1928 Winter Olympics in St. Moritz, where he placed seventh in Nordic combined, and 14th in the 18 km cross-country.

In 1935 Böck founded the first skiing school at Nesselwang. His son Helmut (1931–2025) competed at the 1952 and 1956 Winter Olympics in the same events as his father.
