= Waagen und Gewichte aus dem mittelalterlichen Schleswig =

1997 monograph

Waagen und Gewichte aus dem mittelalterlichen Schleswig.
- Author: Heiko Steuer
- Language: German
- Subject: Medieval north-west European archaeology
- Publisher: Rheinland-Verlag
- Publication date: 1997
- Publication place: Germany
- Media type: Print
- Pages: 442
- ISBN: 3-792-71449-3

Waagen und Gewichte aus dem mittelalterlichen Schleswig. Funde des 11. bis 13. Jahrhunderts aus Europa als Quellen zur Handels- und Währungsgeschichte ('scales and weights from medieval Schleswig: finds from the 11th to 13th centuries from Europe as sources for trade and monetary history') is a 1997 monograph by Heiko Steuer.

== Summary ==
Chapter 1 surveys the history of research and gives a detailed presentation of the monetary context of Steuer's chosen region and period, Schleswig in the eleventh to thirteenth centuries.

Chapter 2 surveys Steuer's corpus of finds: 22 balances (complete or fragmentary) and 22 weights from Schleswig, alongside around 90 type 7 scales, over 145 type 8 scales and hundreds of weights, particularly from the Baltic Sea region and England. Steuer then surveys the various types of early and high medieval scales (types 1-10) from the 9th to early 14th centuries, contemplating their different sizes and their sometimes overlapping production periods. All the scales studied are made of copper alloy, mostly brass, rarely bronze, occasionally with individual parts made of steel and sometimes using perishable materials for the bowls and the bowl suspension. With the exception of type 1, these are always folding scales, whose beam could be folded on both arms to make it easier to pack the scales in metal cases. The author divides the weights, which are made of solid copper alloy or iron with a thin bronze coating, into two types (A, B) with numerous variations, with the smaller weights (A) having the shape of cubo-octahedra (i.e. cubes with cut-off corners) while the heavy weights (B) are more or less spherical. Markings made up of one to six circle points indicate the weight size. Lead weights and special shapes are named types C–E. Two graphics with proportion calculations and one distribution map rounds off the typology of weights. The chapter concludes with a literature review by geographical area.

Chapter 3 catalogues the scales and weights excavated between 1971 and 1994 in the old town of Schleswig. In four excavation areas, the stratigraphic situation provides important clues for dating the finds.

Chapter 4 is a history of the development of the folding scale. Steuer argues against earlier views that this folding mechanism was invented in the Roman imperial period. Folding scales are attested from the late La Tène period and the so-called Migration Period, the techniques used were always different in detail from the medieval examples. Steuer a systematic further development of the scales from antiquity to the Middle Ages, in which the instruments became lighter and finer, and their tongues longer. Based on Byzantine and Arabic models, the invention of the folding scale reached its peak in the second half of the 9th century around Russia and Haithabu, the predecessor settlement of Schleswig. Although individual datable examples can be found at least as late as the 17th century, the folding scale disappeared after its last heyday in the 13th to early 14th century and was then replaced by more precisely manufactured scales made of iron or steel.

Chapter 5 attempts to assess the accuracy of the scales, which evidently depended primarily on the craftsmanship of the scale builder and on the size of the mass to be weighed.

Chapter 6 focuses on the forms, dating, and distribution of types 7 and 8. Based on the Schleswig scales, Steuer examines all the detailed forms of the balance beam, the pointer (or tongue), the chain slings with chain distributors and tare plates, the weighing pans as well as the fork and the handle. He also examines needles and brooches with similar decorations. The formal variations of the balance beam and fork are shown in schematic drawings. Various proportional measurements and formal combination options as well as the temporal and spatial distribution of the scales are illustrated in several graphics and distribution boards. In summary, the author sees the scales of types 7 and 8 from the eleventh to thirteenth century as characteristic of an advanced phase of the weight money economy, although the typological distinctions are of secondary importance. The scales of types 1-6, on the other hand, appear from the late 9th to the early eleventh century, mostly in the tenth.

Chapter 7 focuses on type 6 scales because, judging from the decoration and dimensions of the balance beams, they appear between the older folding scales of types 3–5 and the later types 7–8. Based on the context of the finds, Steuer concludes that type 6 appeared in the 10th century and was then used in parallel with types 7-8 in the 11th century. A further comparison with the scales of type 3 shows a clear increase in the length of the bars between the 10th and 11th/12th centuries, which indicates that the masses to be weighed became heavier during this time. Steuer also discusses the possibility of distinctive styles of different workshops in §7.3, though the likely number of workshops is impossible to determine. The relatively small number of scales preserved and their widespread use by merchants and travelers also hinder systematic localization of production locations. For Haithabu, for example, a half-finished product and the discovery of four scales from the harbour basin suggest the production and commercial transport of type 3 scales.

Chapters 8 and 9 are short, addressing two special cases from Schleswig: two triangular weighing pans that belonged to money scales, and three bone balance-beam fragments.

Chapter 10, in conjunction with Appendix 7, surveys and catalogues written and artistic evidence for scales. The more or less realistic representations of scales occur in a wide variety of thematic contexts, which are listed individually. As well as in book miniatures, on copper engravings, paintings and altarpieces, representations of scales can be found on church portals, reliquaries, candlesticks and stained glass windows. These depictions sometimes comes from areas that lack archaeological finds, such as central Europe, and pictures from the 11th to 13th centuries help to date the twelfth-century transition between scale types 7 and 8.

In Chapter 11, Steuer describes and analyzes all 22 weights found in Schleswig, comparing them with similar finds from other places, taking into account a large number of earlier studies. The type A cubo-octahedron or cube weights were cast in moulds and all show dot markings, the number of which (1-4 and 6) increases with increasing mass and indicates the use of a duodecimal system. However, the points do not represent absolute weights, but only indicate their original position in a set of weights. The largest group within the Schleswig finds are the 15 (or 16?) spherical weights (type B). The markings on them indicate the use of a decimal system, but at the same time the twelve-point system is also found. By examining the relevant find contexts (settlements, castle complexes, graves, treasure finds, etc.), Steuer dates the standard weights based on external characteristics in their relative sequence and their absolute dating. He divides the spherical weights into types B1-older form, B1-middle form, B1-younger form, B2, B3, B4, and ball zone weights with notches. Such a typology that reflects development over time is not possible for the cubo-octahedral weights, as they are found less frequently and are usually less well preserved. The chapter closes by analysing three weights from steelyard balances, a type found in Antiquity, but which in the Middle Ages were apparently only used to weigh heavy commercial goods.

Chapter 12 explores the intended use of the scales and weights. However, taking into account the weights found, it becomes clear that the upper limits of the load capacity were often not adhered to, with the weighing range increasing from the tenth to the thirteenth centuries. Using the example of Schleswig, which successively belonged to Denmark and the German Empire and after the middle of the 12th century was increasingly pushed out of the long-distance trading business by the newly founded city of Lübeck, many changes can probably a shift from the weight money system to the coinage system.

Chapter 13 considers the later forms of scales and weights, following the end of the high medieval types. These include the small steel coin scales that emerged in the 13th century, which usually had triangular or octagonal scales and were stored with the weights of special sizes in rectangular wooden boxes, similar to those that already existed in Byzantine times. Here too, the pictorial tradition is important as a supplement to the original finds. Also noteworthy are the insert, bowl or pot weights that began in the late 13th and 14th centuries, which are a Roman form of weight, and also, as a result of the introduction of gold as a currency base, square or round coin weights. A special feature of this time are the so-called Seiger, steelyards or Kippwaagen (tilting scales) made of metal or bone, used for checking the correct weight of coins in circulation.

Chapter 14 is the concluding discussion. The scales and weights found in the port of Schleswig from the second half of the 11th century were components of the silver weight-money system. This system of the Baltic Sea countries was a good solution for those areas in which a coin system could not yet be implemented. The first minting of silver coins, mostly imitations or re-mintings of proven coins, had no decisive influence on daily payment transactions. Although the North and Baltic Sea countries belonged to different currency areas, there are overlaps due to the mobility of traders. Based on the different composition of the silver treasure finds and the changing type spectrum of scales and weights, the author comes to a division into three successive phases: 1. Phase 880/890–970/1000 (end of the influx of Arabic silver); 2nd phase until 1050/1075 (change of trading activities from Haithabu to Schleswig; transition from weight money to coinage); 3rd phase up to the 13th century (new types of scales and weights; introduction of gold coins). Judging from the finds, most scales were used in cities and settlements with a central market function. The author assumes that scales of types 7 and 8 were primarily used by private individuals, such as merchants, pepper traders and pharmacists. The evaluation of the pictorial representations and historical written sources allows further interesting observations on how scales were used.

Chapter 15 contains appendices, made up of eight catalogs, six surveying scales of types 7 and 8 as well as various scale parts, the seventh giving a chronological list of over 100 representations of scales, and the eighth providing the location evidence and additions to the weights.

A one-and-a-half page English summary concludes the work.

== Reviews ==
- Franken, Norbert, Bonner Jahrbücher, 198.1998 (2001), 630–33 doi:10.11588/bjb.1998.0.46313.
- Ježek, Martin, Archeologické Rozhledy, 53 (2001), 650–53.
- Müller, Ulrich, Offa, 56 (1999), 541–45.
