= Bramberk =

Observation tower in Lučany nad Nisou, Czechia

Coordinates: 50°45′22.77″N 15°12′21.32″E

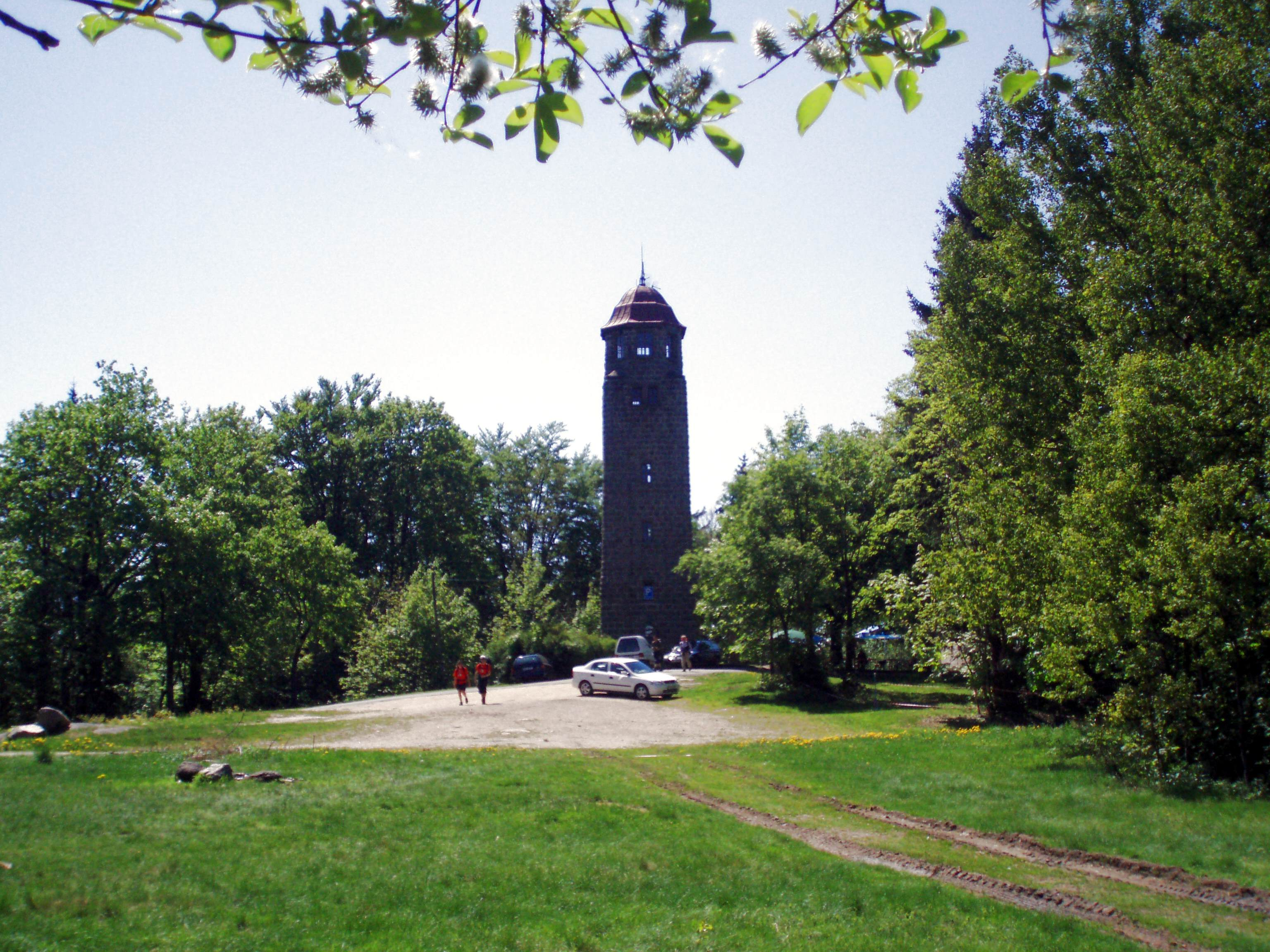
Bramberk

Bramberk (German: Bramberg) is a stone observation tower in the municipality of Lučany nad Nisou in the Czech Republic. It is located on the hill Bramberk (787 m or 2,582 ft above sea level) in the Jizera Mountains. It is 21 metres (69 ft) high, with 87 steps to the top. It was built in 1912.

== See also ==
- Slovanka, another observation tower nearby
