= Heiko Steuer =

German archaeologist

Heiko Steuer (born 30 October 1939) is a German archaeologist, notable for his research into social and economic history in early Europe. He serves as co-editor of Germanische Altertumskunde Online.

== Career ==
Heiko Steuer was born on 30 October 1939, in Braunschweig, Germany. From 1960 until 1969 he studied in Göttingen and Tübingen, first studying mathematics and physics, and then prehistory and early history. In 1976 he was appointed director of the Kölnischen Stadtmuseums (de), the Cologne City Museum; he held the position until 1984. During this time, in 1979, Steuer habilitated himself, on studies of prehistory and early history at the Ruhr University Bochum.

Steuer stepped down from the Cologne City Museum in 1984, the same year he became a full professor of prehistory and early history at the University of Freiburg and also director of the Institute of Prehistory and Archeology of the Middle Ages. He retired from the university in 2005.

During his career, Steuer researched early archaeology, Middle Ages archaeology, German economic and social history, Germanic antiquity, mining archaeology, the history of medieval trade and currency, and the history of research of the field of prehistory and early history. He also edited the Journal of Archeology of the Middle Ages starting in 1972 (with Sebastian Brather (de) and Ulrich Müller), and the Reallexikon der Germanischen Altertumskunde starting in 1994.

Steuer is a member of the German Archaeological Institute, a corresponding member of the Göttingen Academy of Sciences and Humanities, and a member of the Commission for Historical Geography in Baden-Württemberg.

== Publications ==
- Steuer, Heiko (1987). "Helm und Ringschwert: Prunkbewaffnung und Rangabzeichen germanischer Krieger" [Helmet and Ring-Sword: Ornamental Weapons and Insignia of Germanic Warriors]. In Häßler, Hans-Jürgen (ed.). Studien zur Sachsenforschung [Studies in Saxon Research] (in German). Vol. 6. Hildesheim: Lax. pp. 189–236. ISBN 3-7848-1617-7.
- Waagen und Gewichte aus dem mittelalterlichen Schleswig. Funde des 11. bis 13. Jahrhunderts aus Europa als Quellen zur Handels- und Währungsgeschichte, Zeitschrift für Archäologie des Mittelalters, Beiheft 10 (Bonn: Rheinland-Verlag, 1997); ISBN 3792714493.

== Bibliography ==
- Sebastian Brather, Christel Hoeper, Michael Hoeper (eds.): Archäologie als Sozialgeschichte. Studien zu Siedlung, Wirtschaft und Gesellschaft im frühgeschichtlichen Mitteleuropa. Festschrift für Heiko Steuer zum 60. Geburtstag (= Internationale Archäologie. Studia honoraria. Bd. 9). Leidorf, Rahden/Westf. 1999, ISBN 3-89646-389-6.
- Sebastian Brather, Christoph Huth, Dieter Geuenich (eds.): Historia archaeologica. Festschrift für Heiko Steuer zum 70. Geburtstag (= Reallexikon der germanischen Altertumskunde. Ergänzungsbände. Bd. 70). de Gruyter, Berlin u. a. 2009, ISBN 978-3-11-022337-8.
- "Wissenschaftlicher Lebenslauf Prof. Dr. Heiko Steuer". Albert-Ludwigs-Universität Freiburg. Archived from the original on 3 April 2015.
