= Dieter Geuenich =

German historian

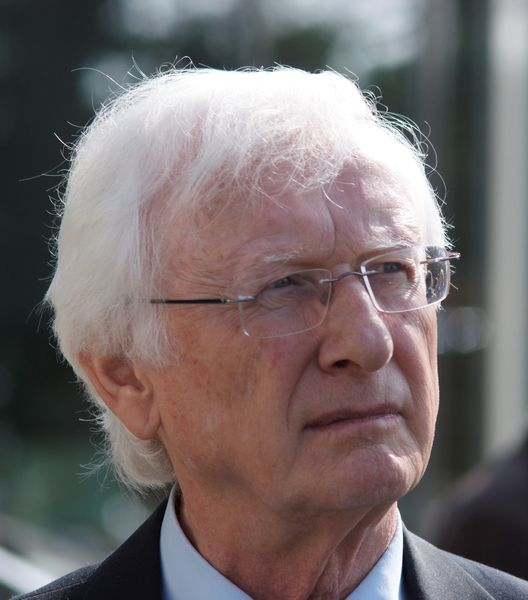
- Born: 17 February 1943 (age 83); Bad Honnef, Germany

Academic background
- Education: University of Münster
- Doctoral advisor: Karl Schmid

Academic work
- Discipline: History
- Sub-discipline: Medieval studies
- Institutions: University of Duisburg-Essen
- Main interests: Alemanni
- Notable works: Reallexikon der Germanischen Altertumskunde

Dieter Geuenich (born 17 February 1943) is a German historian who specializes in the history of Germanic peoples.

== Biography ==
Dieter Geuenich was born on 17 February 1943 in Bad Honnef, Germany. He studied history, Germanistics, theology and philosophy at the universities of Bonn and Münster, and received his PhD at Münster in 1972 under the supervision of Karl Schmid. From 1972 to 1982, Geuenich was a research assistant in history at the University of Freiburg. He gained his habilitation at Freiburg in 1981, and subsequently served as Professor of Medieval History at the University of Freiburg from 1982 to 1987. He was appointed Chair of Medieval History at the University of Duisburg-Essen in 1989. He has served as visiting professor at the University of Tokyo (1992-1993) and University of Los Angeles (1994). Geuenich became a corresponding member of the Göttingen Academy of Sciences and Humanities in 2000. From 2004 to 2008, he was professor at the University of Duisburg-Essen.

Geuenich is well known for his authoritative studies on the Alemanni. He was a co-editor of the second edition of the Reallexikon der Germanischen Altertumskunde.

== Selected works ==
- Die Personennamen der Klostergemeinschaft von Fulda im früheren Mittelalter, 1976
- Geschichte der Alemannen, 1997

== See also ==
- Herwig Wolfram
- John F. Drinkwater

== Sources ==
- "Prof. Dr. Dieter Geuenich". University of Duisburg-Essen.
