= Královka =

Coordinates: 50.7921°N 15.1575°E

General information
- Type: Observation tower
- Location: Jizera Mountains, Czech Republic

Height
- Roof: 23.5 m (77 ft)
- Top floor: 20.5 m (67 ft)

Královka (German: Königshöhe) is a stone observation tower situated 859 metres above the sea level on Nekras Hill in the central Jizera Mountains in the area of Janov nad Nisou, less than a kilometre from Bedřichov. The total height of the tower is 23.5 metres and the viewing platform is at a height of 20.5 metres. 102 stairs lead the visitors to the top of the observation tower.

== History ==
The original building was constructed in 1888 and was made of wood. This building was destroyed in 1906 and a new stone observation tower was built in 1907. In 1934 a chalet with a restaurant and possible accommodation was built next to the tower. This chalet replaced the wooden public house from 1890, which burnt down in 1933.

== Access to the observation tower ==
The tower is situated on a busy road connecting the tourist and sports centres of Bedřichov and Hrabětice. The tower can be accessed on foot, cross country skis, by bike, or by car.

- On foot - Take the red trail from the cross-country skiing stadium or the blue one from the Centrum Guest House (150 metres from the tourist information centre towards Jablonec nad Nisou).
- By bike - Bikers can take cycling path no. 3023 from Bedřichov to Nová louka or go from the Myslivecká Chata past the Lesní Bouda along path no. 3020 uphill for about 1 km.
- On cross country skis - It is possible to take the Jizera Trail from the cross country skiing stadium in winter.
- By car - Drive from the central car park in Bedřichov towards Nová louka. There is a large car park at the Královka Observation Tower.

== View from the observation tower ==
One can see the main ridge of the Jizera Mountains, Poland and Germany, Bohemian Paradise, the Giant Mountains, Ještěd, Jablonec nad Nisou and Bedřichov from the tower.
