= Sebastian Brather =

German archaeologist

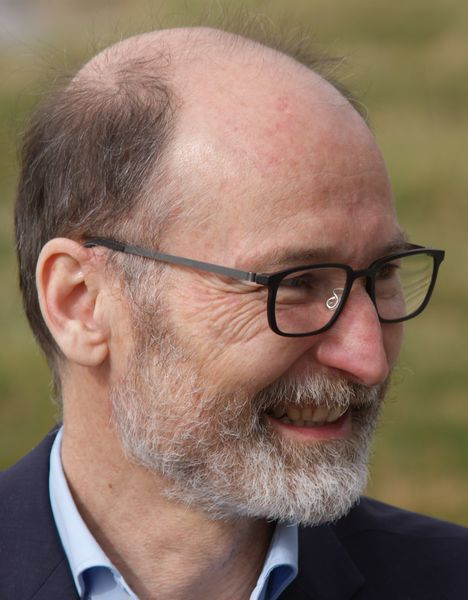
- Sebastian Brather
- Born: 28 June 1964 (age 62); Potsdam, East Germany

Academic background
- Education: Humboldt University of Berlin

Academic work
- Discipline: Archaeology
- Institutions: University of Freiburg

Sebastian Brather (born 28 June 1964) is a German medieval archaeologist and co-editor of Germanische Altertumskunde Online.

== Career ==
Brather received his PhD in archaeology from the Humboldt University of Berlin in 1995 with a thesis Feldberger Keramik und frühe Slawen: Studien zur nordwestslawischen Keramik der Karolingerzeit.

In 2002 his habilitation thesis in University of Freiburg was Ethnische Interpretationen in der frühgeschichtlichen Archäologie: Geschichte, Grundlagen und Alternativen. In the next two years worked as research assistant at Goethe University in Frankfurt and Main, to return to Freiburg where taught as a holder of GRF scholarship. Since 2006 has been Professor of Prehistoric and Medieval Archaeology at the same university.

A member of the Historical Commission for Silesia and German Archaeological Institute, since 2003 is co-editor of the Journal of Medieval Archaeology and since 2011 contributes as co-editor to the Germanische Altertumskunde Online published by De Gruyter.

Brather has conducted much research on the archaeology of late antiquity and Middle Ages especially about the West Slavs. Brather in a similar fashion of processual archaeology considers ethnic identity to be a social construct which is out of reach of archaeology and argues against culture-historical methodology of easily making direct links between material culture and ethnic identities.

== Bibliography ==
- Feldberger Keramik und frühe Slawen: Studien zur nordwestslawischen Keramik der Karolingerzeit. Habelt, Bonn 1996 (= Universitätsforschungen zur prähistorischen Archäologie, Vol 34; Schriften zur Archäologie der germanischen und slawischen Frühgeschichte, Vol 1), ISBN 3-7749-2768-5.
- Editor: Archäologie als Sozialgeschichte. Studien zu Siedlung, Wirtschaft und Gesellschaft im frühgeschichtlichen Mitteleuropa. Festschrift für Heiko Steuer zum 60. Geburtstag. Leidorf, Rahden 1999 (= Internationale Archäologie. Studia honoraria, Vol 9), ISBN 3-89646-389-6.
- "Ethnische Identitäten als Konstrukte der frühgeschichtlichen Archäologie". In: Germania 78–2000, S. 139–177 (auf journals.ub.uni.heidelberg.de).
- Archäologie der westlichen Slawen: Siedlung, Wirtschaft und Gesellschaft im früh- und hochmittelalterlichen Ostmitteleuropa. De Gruyter, Berlin-New York 2001 (= Reallexikon der Germanischen Altertumskunde, Vol 30); 2nd edition by de Gruyter, Berlin-New York 2008, Vol 61, ISBN 978-3-11-020609-8.
- "The beginnings of Slavic settlement east of the river Elbe". Antiquity, Volume 78, Issue 300. pp. 314–329
- "The Archaeology of the Northwestern Slavs (Seventh To Ninth Centuries)". East Central Europe, 31(1), pp. 77–97.
- Ethnische Interpretationen in der frühgeschichtlichen Archäologie: Geschichte, Grundlagen und Alternativen. De Gruyter, Berlin-New York 2004 (= Reallexikon der Germanischen Altertumskunde, Vol 42);
- Editor with Christine Kratzke: Auf dem Weg zum Germania-Slavica-Konzept. Perspektiven von Geschichtswissenschaft, Archäologie, Onomastik und Kunstgeschichte seit dem 19. Jahrhundert. Leipziger Universitäts-Verlag, Leipzig 2005 (= GWZO-Arbeitshilfen, Vol 3), ISBN 3-86583-108-7.
- Editor: Zwischen Spätantike und Frühmittelalter: Archäologie des 4. bis 7. Jahrhunderts im Westen. De Gruyter, Berlin-New York 2008 (= Reallexikon der Germanischen Altertumskunde, Vol 57), ISBN 978-3-11-020049-2.
- "The Western Slavs of the Seventh to the Eleventh Century – An Archaeological Perspective". History Compass. Vol 9 (6), pp. 454–473
- Editor: Recht und Kultur im frühmittelalterlichen Alemannien. De Gruyter, 2017 (= Reallexikon der Germanischen Altertumskunde, Vol 102), ISBN 9783110452945
- Editor with Wilhelm Heizmann and Steffen Patzold: Germanische Altertumskunde im Wandel: Archäologische, philologische und geschichtswissenschaftliche Beiträge aus 150 Jahren. De Gruyter, 2021 ISBN 9783110561852
