= Lučany nad Nisou =

- Town
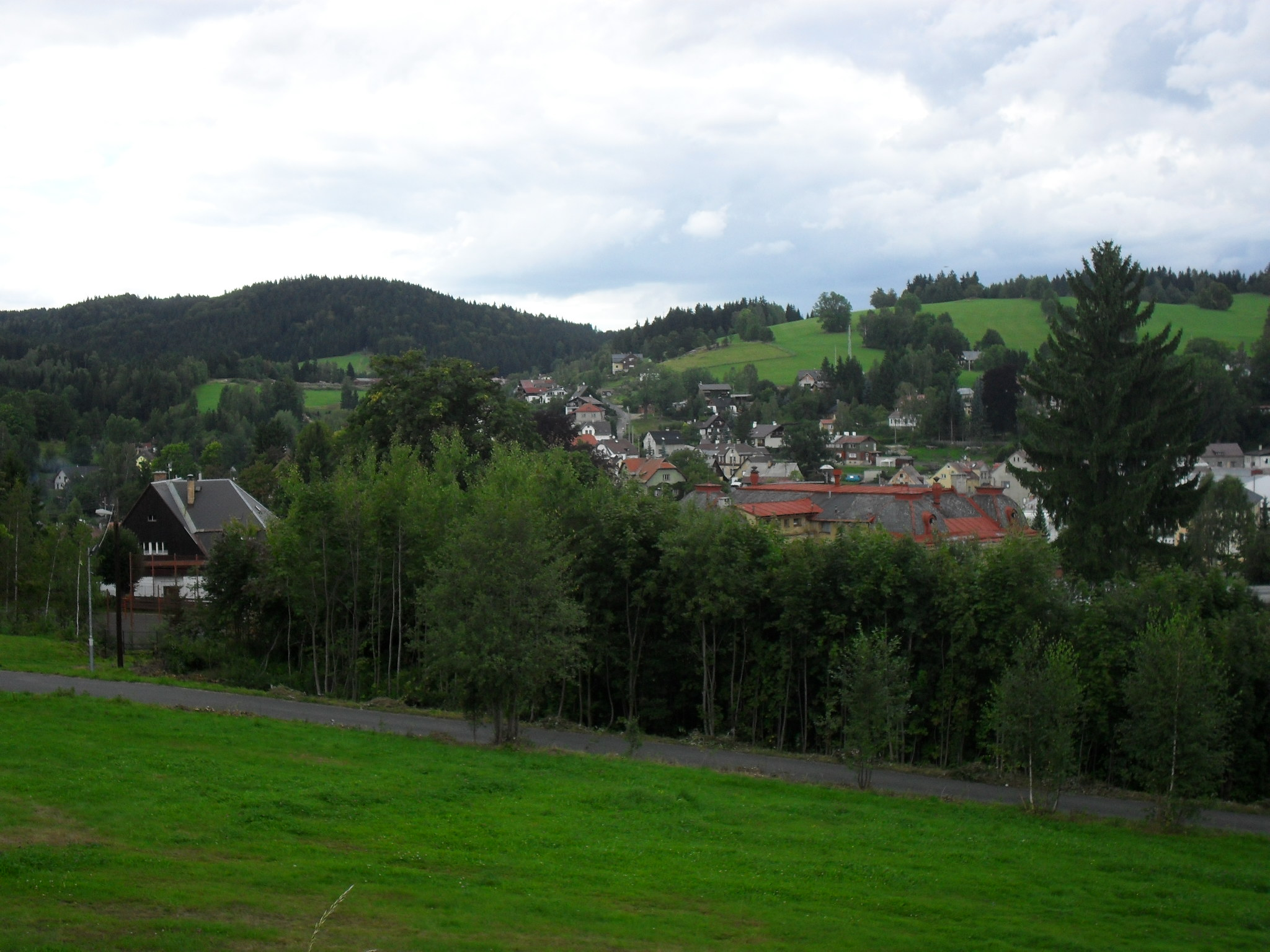
- View of Lučany nad Nisou

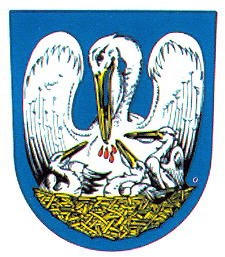
- Coat of arms

- Location in the Czech Republic
- Coordinates: 50°44′51″N 15°13′9″E
- Country: Czech Republic
- Region: Liberec
- District: Jablonec nad Nisou
- First mentioned: 1623

Government
  - Mayor: Jiří Palát

Area
  - Total: 13.13 km^{2} (5.07 sq mi)
- Elevation: 598 m (1,962 ft)

Population (2026-01-01)
  - Total: 1,958
  - Density: 149.1/km^{2} (386.2/sq mi)
- Time zone: UTC+1 (CET)
  - Summer (DST): UTC+2 (CEST)
- Postal codes: 466 02, 468 44, 468 71
- Website: www.lucany.cz

Lučany nad Nisou (Czech pronunciation: [ˈlutʃanɪ ˈnad ɲɪsou]; German: Wiesenthal) is a town in Jablonec nad Nisou District in the Liberec Region of the Czech Republic. It has about 2,000 inhabitants. It lies in the Jizera Mountains.

== Administrative division ==
Lučany nad Nisou consists of three municipal parts (in brackets population according to the 2021 census):

- Lučany nad Nisou (1,643)
- Horní Maxov (160)
- Jindřichov (149)

== Etymology ==
The German name Wiesenthal means 'meadow valley'. The Czech name Lučany (from louka, i.e. 'meadow') was derived from the German name.

== Geography ==
Lučany nad Nisou is located about 3 kilometres (2 mi) northeast of Jablonec nad Nisou. It lies in the Jizera Mountains. The highest point is the mountain Slovanka at 820 m (2,690 ft) above sea level.

== History ==
The first written mention of Lučany nad Nisou is from 1623. In 1892, the village was promoted to a market town and in 1913, it became a town. After World War II, Lučany nad Nisou lost its town status, but it was returned to the municipality in 2006.

== Demographics ==
Historical population

Year	Pop.	±%
1869	3,644	—
1880	4,056	+11.3%
1890	4,413	+8.8%
1900	4,725	+7.1%
1910	5,038	+6.6%

Year	Pop.	±%
1921	4,323	−14.2%
1930	5,119	+18.4%
1950	2,386	−53.4%
1961	1,967	−17.6%
1970	1,893	−3.8%

Year	Pop.	±%
1980	1,754	−7.3%
1991	1,438	−18.0%
2001	1,573	+9.4%
2011	1,716	+9.1%
2021	1,952	+13.8%

Source: Censuses

== Transport ==
Lučany nad Nisou is located on the railway line Liberec–Szklarska Poręba.

== Sights ==
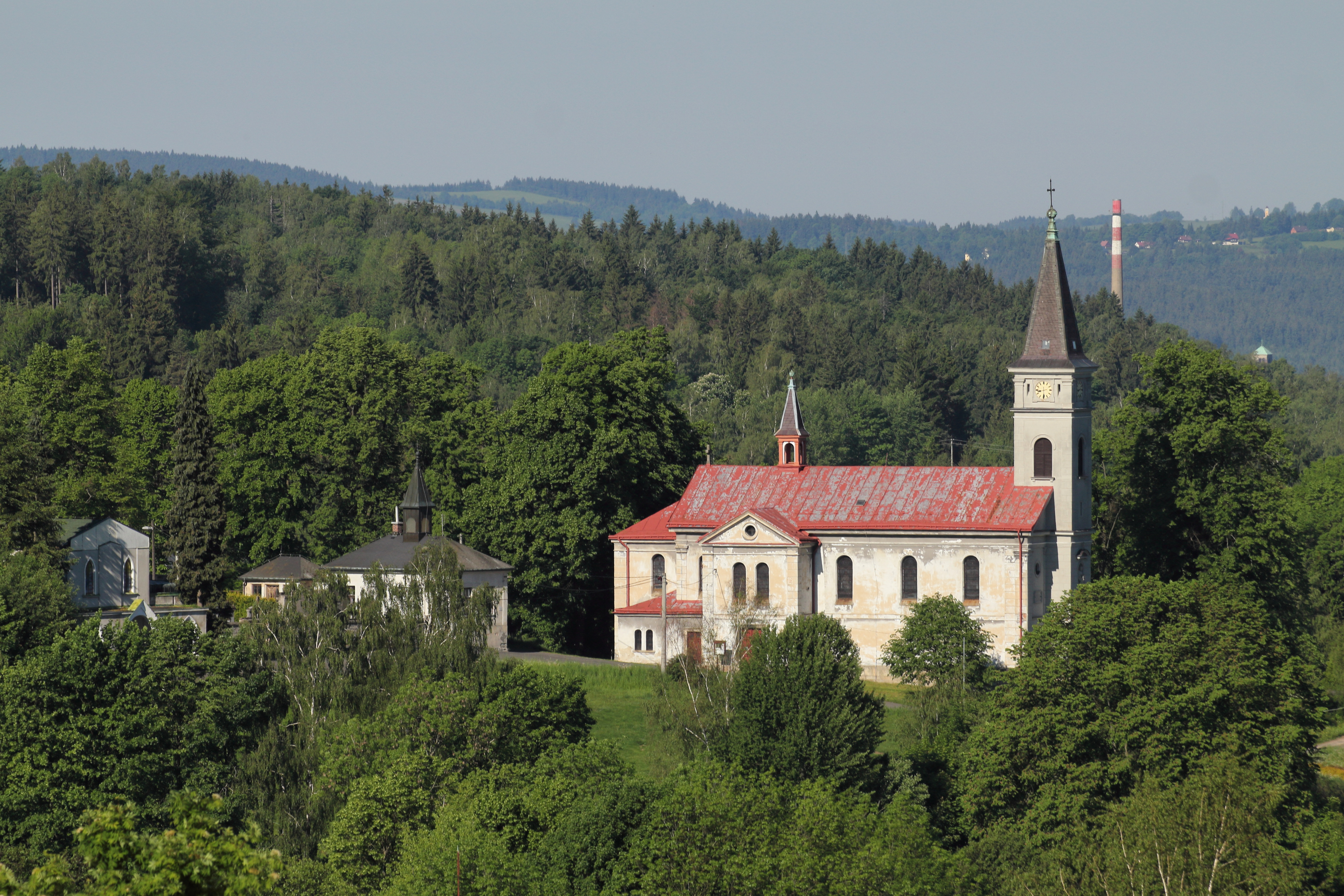
Church of the Visitation of the Virgin Mary

The main landmark of Lučany nad Nisou is the Church of the Visitation of the Virgin Mary. It was built in the neo-Renaissance style in 1886–1889. The second church in the municipality is the Church of the Sacred Heart of Jesus in Horní Maxov.

There are two observation towers in the municipal territory, Bramberk and Slovanka on the eponymous mountains. There are the Stations of the Cross along the way to the top of Slovanka.
