= Jindřichov (Lučany nad Nisou) =

Coordinates: 50°45′1″N 15°11′40″E

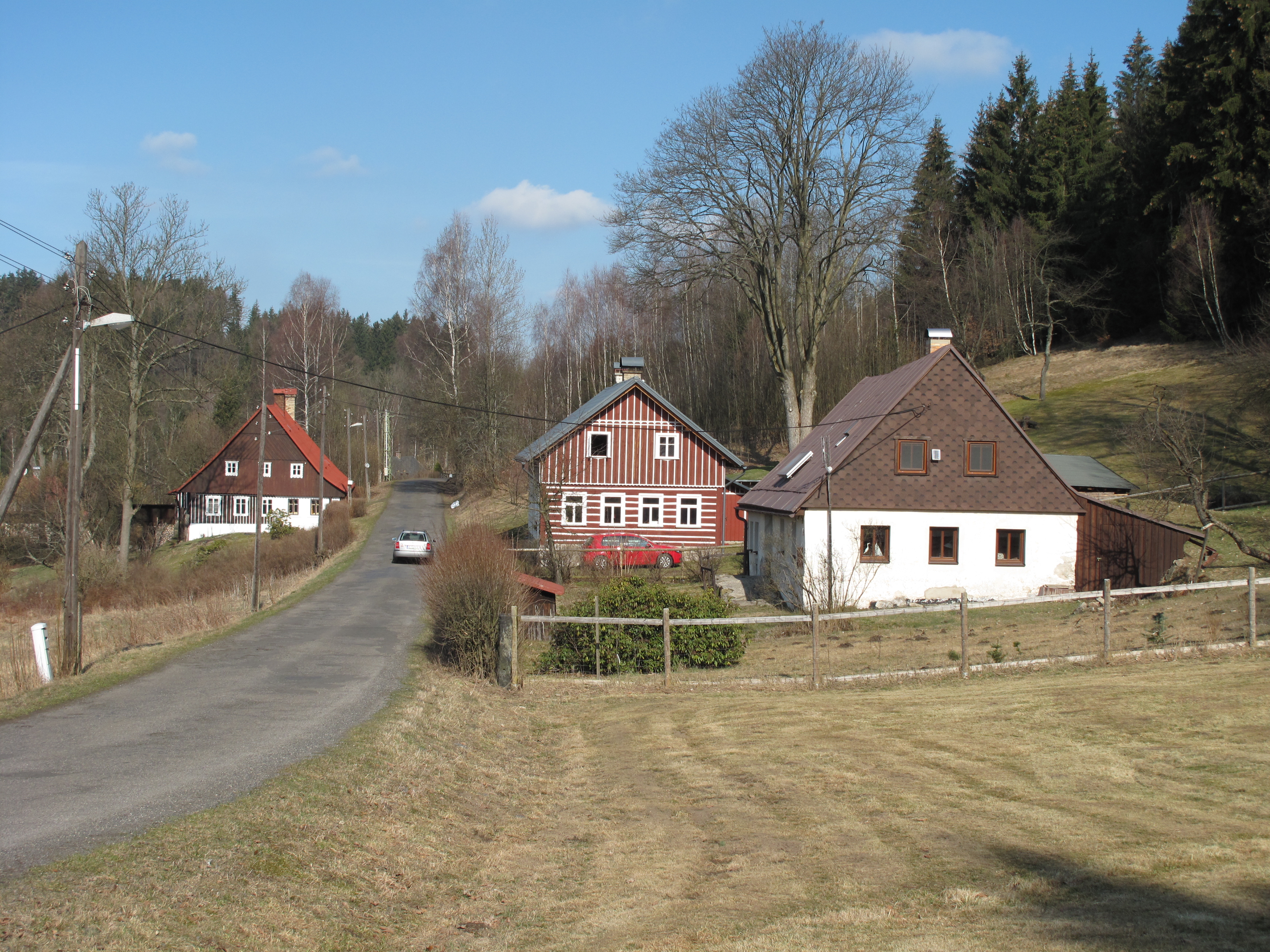
Houses in Jindřichov

Jindřichov is a village and administrative part of Lučany nad Nisou in the Liberec Region of the Czech Republic. It has about 100 inhabitants. It has a shape of a thin, 3 km long upgoing village.
