= Robert Nedoma =

Austrian philologist (born 1961)

- Born: 1961 (age 64–65); Ternitz, Austria

Academic background
- Education: University of Vienna

Academic work
- Discipline: Germanic philology
- Institutions: University of Vienna
- Main interests: Early Germanic culture

Robert Nedoma (born 1961) is an Austrian philologist who is professor at Department for Scandinavian Studies at the University of Vienna. He specializes in Germanic studies and Old Norse studies.

== Biography ==
Robert Nedoma was born in 1961 in Ternitz, Austria. He gained his PhD at the University of Vienna in 1987 with a dissertation on Wayland the Smith, and subsequently worked as a researcher at the Institute for Germanic Studies at the University of Vienna. He completed his habilitation in 2004 with a thesis on Germanic names and runes, and was appointed an associate professor at the University of Vienna in 2010. Since 2019, Nedoma has been Professor at the Department for Scandinavian Studies at the University of Vienna.

Nedoma specializes in Old Norse language and Old Norse literature, runology, Germanic names, and Germanic Antiquity. He is the author of a number of articles for the second edition of the Reallexikon der Germanischen Altertumskunde, and an editor of many journals, including Die Sprache, Philologica Germanica and North-Western European Language Evolution.

Nedoma was elected a member of the Royal Gustavus Adolphus Academy in 2018, a member of the Norwegian Academy of Science and Letters in 2020, and a member of the Austrian Academy of Sciences in 2022.

== Selected works ==
- Die bildlichen und schriftlichen Denkmäler der Wielandsage, 1988
- Gautreks saga konungs, 1990
- (with Hermann Reichert:) Lexikon der altgermanischen Namen. 2. Teil: Register, 1990
- Die Inschrift auf dem Helm B von Negau: Möglichkeiten und Grenzen der Deutung norditalischer epigraphischer Denkmäler, 1995
- (Editor) Erzählen im mittelalterlichen Skandinavien, 2000
- Personennamen in südgermanischen Runeninschriften, 2004
- Kleine Grammatik des Altisländischen, 3rd ed., 2010
- Altisländisches Lesebuch. Ausgewählte Texte und Minimalwörterbuch des Altisländischen, 2011
- (Editor) Erzählen im mittelalterlichen Skandinavien II, 2014
- (Editor) Grammarians, skalds and rune carvers, 2 vols., 2016
- (with Klaus Düwel and Sigmund Oehrl:) Die südgermanischen Runeninschriften. 2 parts, 2020
- (with Klaus Düwel:) Runenkunde, 2023
- (Editor) Erzählen im mittelalterlichen Skandinavien III, 2025

== See also ==
- Heinrich Beck
- Helmut Birkhan
- Wilhelm Heizmann
- Hermann Reichert
- Michael Schulte
- Rudolf Simek

== Sources ==
- "Robert Nedoma". University of Vienna.
