= Michael Schulte (professor) =

German professor of linguistics

Michael Schulte (born 17 July 1963 in Aachen, Germany) is a professor and chair of Nordic linguistics at the University of Agder in Norway.

== Germanic philology, runology, historical sociolinguistics ==
Michael Schulte holds a PhD in historical linguistics from the University of Bonn and has studied in all the Nordic countries, particularly in Iceland, Norway, and Sweden. Schulte has published abundantly in high-profile journals on runology, language history, historical sociolinguistics and writing systems. Until 2018 he was working on the national language project "Norsk språkhistorie" (Norwegian language history), which has been finalized in 2018. Schulte is a member of several Academies such as Royal Norwegian Society of Sciences and Letters and The Agder Academy of Sciences and Letters (Agder vitenskapsakademi, AVA) and the Royal Gustavus Adolphus Academy in Sweden (Kungl. Gustav Adolfs Akademien för Svensk Folkkultur, KGAA). In 2023 he became a fellow of the Royal Historical Society, and in 2024 he was elected into Academia Europaea. Schulte is an "International Cooperation Partner" of the Academy Project "Runische Schriftlichkeit in den germanischen Sprachen ‒ Runic Writing in the Germanic Languages (RuneS)", a long-term research project under the umbrella of the Göttingen Academy of Sciences and Humanities. Schulte is engaged as professor-II at the University of Iceland, and he is a vice-president of the International Society for Dialectology and Geolinguistics (ISDG) since 27 September 2015. Schulte became a professor-II at the Heliopolis University in Cairo in 2019.

Schulte has also been a member of the board of SEKEM Scandinavia since 2008.

== Awards ==
In 2014, Schulte received the Fridtjof Nansen Prize for Outstanding Research from the Nansen Trust (Nansenfondet) for his work on Old Germanic and early Nordic linguistics.

== See also ==
- Robert Nedoma
