= Wilhelm Heizmann =

German philologist (born 1953)

- Born: 5 September 1953 (age 73); Eggenfelden, Germany

Academic background
- Education: LMU Munich; University of Göttingen
- Academic advisor: Kurt Schier

Academic work
- Discipline: Germanic philology
- Institutions: University of Vienna; LMU Munich; University of Göttingen
- Main interests: Early Germanic culture

Wilhelm Heizmann (born 5 September 1953) is a German philologist who was Professor and Chair of the Institute for Nordic Philology at LMU Munich. Heizmann specializes in Germanic studies, and is a co-editor of the Germanische Altertumskunde Online.

== Biography ==
Wilhelm Heizmann was born in Eggenfelden, Germany on 5 September 1953. From 1974 to 1981, Heizmann studied German philology, ancient and medieval history, ethnology, Nordic philology and Germanic Antiquity at LMU Munich and the University of Vienna. He received his MA at LMU Munich. From 1981 to 1982, Heizmann studied at the University of Oxford and the University of London. With funding from the German Academic Exchange Service, Heizmann subsequently stayed for two years as a researcher at the Arnamagnæan Institute at the University of Copenhagen, during which he also conducted research at Reykjavík University. He held a scholarship at the Studienstiftung from 1983 to 1984. From 1984 to 1993, Heizmann was a research assistant at the Scandinavian Seminar at the University of Göttingen. He obtained a PhD at LMU Munich in 1987, and completed his habilitation at the University of Göttingen in 1994.

Since 1994, Heizmann taught at the University of Göttingen, where he was appointed an associate professor in 1999. From 2000 to 2001, Heizman was a visiting professor at the Institute for Germanic Studies at the University of Vienna. Since 2002, Heizmann has been Professor and Chair of the Institute for Nordic Philology at LMU Munich. He was appointed a member of the Scientific Advisory Board of the Brothers Grimm Society in 2002, an honorary professor at the University of Göttingen in 2004, and a corresponding member of the Göttingen Academy of Sciences and Humanities in 2009.

Heizmann specializes in Germanic studies. He researches and teaches Germanic paganism and mythology (including Old Norse religion and mythology), Old Norse literature, runology, as well as the scientific works of the Brothers Grimm. He is Co-Editor of Germanische Altertumskunde Online.

== Selected works ==
- Wörterbuch der Pflanzennamen im Altwestnordischen, 1993
- Bilddenkmäler zur germanischen Götter- und Heldensage, 2015

== See also ==
- Heinrich Beck
- Hermann Reichert
- Helmut Birkhan
- Rudolf Simek
- Robert Nedoma

== Sources ==
- "Wilhelm Heizmann". University of Göttingen.
