= Germanische Altertumskunde Online =

Encyclopedia of the study of Germanic history

Germanische Altertumskunde Online, formerly called Reallexikon der Germanischen Altertumskunde, is a German encyclopedia of the study of Germanic history and cultures, as well as the cultures that were in close contact with them.

The first edition of the Reallexikon der Germanischen Altertumskunde appeared in four volumes between 1911 and 1919, edited by Johannes Hoops. The second edition, under the auspices of the Göttingen Academy of Sciences and Humanities, was edited by Heinrich Beck (from vol 1, 1968/72), Heiko Steuer (from vol. 8, 1991/94), Rosemarie Müller (from 1992), and Dieter Geuenich (from vol. 13, 1999), and was published by Walter de Gruyter in 35 volumes between 1968 and 2008.

In 2010, the most recent version was published, now renamed Germanische Altertumskunde Online. Edited by Heinrich Beck, Heiko Steuer, Dieter Geuenich, Wilhelm Heizmann, Sebastian Brather, Steffen Patzold and Sigmund Oehrl, it is published online by De Gruyter, accessible via subscription.
