= Heinrich Beck (philologist) =

German philologist (1929–2019)

- Born: 2 April 1929; Nördlingen, Germany
- Died: 5 June 2019 (aged 90); Munich, Germany
- Awards: Knight's Cross of the Order of the Falcon (1988)

Academic background
- Education: LMU Munich; Reykjavík University

Academic work
- Discipline: Germanic philology
- Institutions: Saarland University; University of Bonn
- Notable students: Arnulf Krause; Astrid van Nahl; Michael Schulte
- Main interests: Early Germanic culture
- Notable works: Reallexikon der Germanischen Altertumskunde (1968-2008)

Heinrich Beck (born 2 April 1929 – 5 June 2019) was a German philologist who specialized in Germanic studies. A Professor of Ancient German and Nordic Studies at Saarland University and later the University of Bonn, Beck was a co-editor of the second edition of Reallexikon der Germanischen Altertumskunde and one of the world's leading experts on early Germanic culture.

== Biography ==
Hermann Beck was born Nördlingen, Germany on 2 April 1929. Gaining his abitur in Munich in 1949, Beck studied German, Scandinavian and linguistics at LMU Munich and Reykjavík University. He gained his PhD in Nordic philology and Germanic studies at LMU Munich in 1962. He completed his habilitation in Germanic studies at LMU Munich in 1967.

From 1968 to 1978, Beck was Professor of Ancient German and Nordic Studies at Saarland University. From 1978 until his retirement in 1994, Beck was Professor of Ancient German and Nordic Studies at the University of Bonn.

Beck specialized in the study of Germanic languages and early Germanic literature. He was a prominent expert on early Germanic culture. From 1968 to 2008, Beck was a co-editor of the second edition of Reallexikon der Germanischen Altertumskunde, to which he contributed many articles. He subsequently contributed significantly to Germanische Altertumskunde Online. Beck was awarded the Knight's Cross of the Order of the Falcon in 1988, and an honorary doctor's degree from the University of Minnesota, Minneapolis, in 2002.

== See also ==
- Hermann Reichert
- Rudolf Simek
- Rudolf Much
- Wilhelm Heizmann
- Helmut Birkhan
- Robert Nedoma

== Selected works ==
- Einige vendelzeitliche Bilddenkmäler und die literarische Überlieferung, 1964
- Das Ebersignum im Germanischen, 1965
- (Co-editor) Reallexikon der germanischen Altertumskunde, 1973–2015
- (Co-editor) Untersuchungen zur eisenzeitlichen und frühmittelalterlichen Flur in Mitteleuropa und ihrer Nutzung, 1979-1980
- (Editor) Arbeiten zur Skandinavistik: 6, 1985
- (Editor) Germanenprobleme in heutiger Sicht, 1986
- (Editor) Heldensage und Heldendichtung im Germanischen, 1988
- (Editor) Germanische Rest- und Trümmersprachen, 1989
- (Editor) Germanische Religionsgeschichte, 1992
- (Editor) Snorri Sturlusons Sicht der paganen Vorzeit, 1994
- (Co-editor) Haus und Hof in ur- und frühgeschichtlicher Zeit, 1997
- (Co-editor) De consolatione philologiae, 2000
- (Editor) Studien zur Isländersaga, 2000
- (Co-editor) Zur Geschichte der Gleichung "germanisch-deutsch", 2004
- (Co-editor) Germanische Altertumskunde Online, 2010-
- (Co-editor) Altertumskunde, Altertumswissenschaft, Kulturwissenschaft, 2012
- (Co-editor) Snorri Sturluson: Historiker, Dichter, Politiker, 2013

== Sources ==
- "Nachruf auf Prof. Dr. Dr. h.c. Heinrich Beck". University of Bonn (in German).
- Wilfried Kürschner: Linguisten-Handbuch. Gunter Narr Verlag, Tübingen 1997. ISBN 3-8233-5001-3.
