= Old Norse literature =

Old Norse literature refers to the vernacular literature of the Scandinavian people up to c. 1350. It mainly consists of Icelandic writings.

== Genres ==
The main genres of Old Norse literature are saga literature, which is in prose, and Old Norse poetry, which includes skaldic poetry and the Eddas.

== In Britain ==
From the 8th to the 15th centuries, Vikings and Norse settlers and their descendants colonised parts of what is now modern Scotland. Some Old Norse poetry survives relating to this era. The Orkneyinga saga (also called the History of the Earls of Orkney) is a historical narrative of the history of the Orkney Islands, from their capture by the Norwegian king in the 9th century onwards until about 1200. 20th-century poet George Mackay Brown was influenced by the saga, notably for his 1973 novel Magnus. The Icelandic Njáls saga includes actions taking place in Orkney and Wales. Besides these Icelandic sagas a few examples, sometimes fragmentary, of Norse poetry composed in Scotland survive. Among the runic inscriptions at Maeshowe is a text identified as irregular verse. Scandinavian cultural contacts in the Danelaw also left legacies in literature. Höfuðlausn or the "Head's Ransom" is a skaldic poem attributed to Egill Skalla-Grímsson in praise of king Eirik Bloodaxe in the Kingdom of Northumbria.

== See also ==
- Edda
- Norse sagas
  - Icelanders' sagas
  - Kings' sagas
  - Legendary sagas
- Old Icelandic Homily Book
- Old Norse poetry
- Scandinavian literature
  - Danish literature
  - Faroese literature
  - Icelandic literature
  - Norwegian literature
  - Swedish literature

== Weblinks ==
- Old Norse Prose and Poetry from heimskringla.no
- Overview of translations of Old Norse literature on landsbokasafn.is
