= Scandinavian studies =

Field of study

Map of Scandinavia

Map of Nordic countries, that includes Scandinavia and countries with cultural and political ties to Scandinavia

Scandinavian studies or Scandinavistics is an interdisciplinary academic field of area studies, mainly in the United States and Germany, that primarily focuses on the Scandinavian languages (also known as North Germanic languages) and cultural studies pertaining to Scandinavia and Scandinavian language and culture in the other Nordic countries. While Scandinavia is defined as Denmark, Norway and Sweden, the term Scandinavian in an ethnic, cultural and linguistic sense is often used synonymously with North Germanic and also refers to the peoples and languages of the Faroe Islands and Iceland; furthermore a minority in Finland are ethnically Scandinavian and speak Swedish natively.

Scandinavian studies does not exist as a separate field within Scandinavia or the Nordic countries themselves, as its scope would be considered far too broad to be treated meaningfully within a single discipline. The closest related field in Scandinavia would be the more narrow discipline of Nordic linguistics, which covers North Germanic languages. A major focus of Scandinavian studies is the teaching of Scandinavian languages, especially the three large languages Danish, Norwegian and Swedish.

== Overview ==
Scandinavian studies principally focuses on Danish, Norwegian and Swedish philology, especially linguistics, history and cultural studies. Denmark, Norway and Sweden form Scandinavia according to the definition prevalent in Scandinavia itself and their majority peoples are Scandinavians in the ethnic sense who speak Scandinavian languages in the linguistic sense. Scandinavian studies usually also covers Icelandic and Faroese philology, and philology as it relates to the Swedish minority in Finland. The field is also home to research related to the Scandinavian diaspora as well as regions affected by Scandinavian colonialism.

In German-speaking Europe, Scandinavian studies (Skandinavistik) tends to be defined as a subfield of Germanic languages, and covering Danish, Norwegian, Swedish, and less commonly Faroese and Icelandic languages as well as accompanying literature and culture. Nonetheless, some departments, most notably the institute (Nordeuropa-Institut) at the Humboldt University of Berlin and University of Mainz, expand this to include coverage of the greater Nordic region, including courses in variously Finnish (Berlin, Mainz,), Estonian (Vienna; formerly Mainz, now only available for study as an optional component of Finnish studies (Fennistik) at some other universities), Latvian (Mainz)) and Lithuanian (Mainz), Vienna) language and culture.

Universities offering education and performing research in Scandinavian studies are located throughout North America and in parts of Europe. Learned societies within the field include the Society for the Advancement of Scandinavian Study (SASS) with its quarterly journal Scandinavian Studies, the International Association of Scandinavian Studies (IASS), and the Association for the Advancement of Scandinavian Studies in Canada (AASSC).

Departments of Scandinavian Studies in the United States are located at the University of California, Berkeley, the University of Washington, the University of Wisconsin–Madison, and Gustavus Adolphus College in Minnesota. The University of Wisconsin - Madison's program began in 1875 and is the oldest program in the United States. It is the "Nordic" unit within the German, Nordic, and Slavic (GNS+) department and includes scholars of Scandinavia and the other Nordic countries.

In the UK, University College London and the University of Edinburgh host the only remaining full departments of Scandinavian Studies. Other institutions, like the University of Aberdeen, have specialized research centers dedicated to Scandinavian Studies

At some universities in the United States Scandinavian studies is placed in the same department as Baltic studies, although the Baltic states, their cultures and languages are even less related to Scandinavia and Scandinavian languages than the latter are to English, a West Germanic language. In contrast, Baltic studies is commonly grouped together with Slavic or Eastern European studies at Scandinavian universities such as the University of Oslo, and is regarded as completely unrelated to Scandinavian studies.
