= List of figures in Germanic heroic legend, H–He =

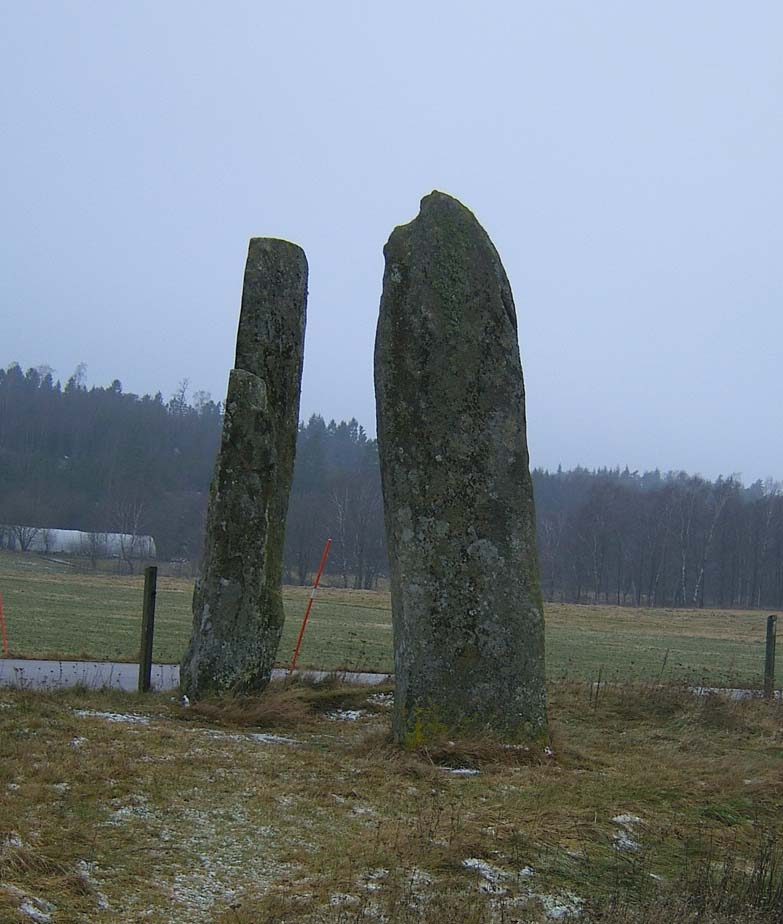
"Hagbard's gallows", a megalithic monument in Asige, Halland, Sweden.

== H ==
Figure	Names in medieval languages	Historical origin	Name meaning	Relationships	Early and English Attestations	Norse Attestations	German Attestations
Hache	Old English: Hēhca, Middle High German: Hâche, Old Norse: Áki Aurlungatrausti	Kemp Malone suggested that the name represented Achiulf (*Hāhiwulf), father of Ermanaric.	The name is probably based on Gmc *hanha-, OHG hâhan ("to hang"). The Norse form in the Þiðreks saga is not cognate, see Áki^{1}	In German tradition the father of Eckehart, protector of the Harlungen. In the Þiðreks saga, he is the father of their analogues. He also kills Earl Iron, who was the lover of his unfaithful wife Bolfriana. She marries Widege (Vithga) after he dies. In Widsith, he is mentioned in the same line as the Harlungen and as the head of Ermanaric's retinue. In Wolfdietrich, he aids Wolfdietrich and kills his brothers Bauge and Wachsmut who sought to disinherit their brother.	Widsith		Þiðreks saga, Biterolf und Dietleib, Wolfdietrich, Heldenbuch-Prosa
Hadawardus	Latin: Hadawardus	Wilhelm Grimm suggests that he may have been the same individual as Hawart in the Nibelungenlied.	The first element is from haþu ("battle"), and the second element is from vardu ("guardian").	One of Gunther's warriors killed by Walter of Aquitaine.			Waltharius
Haddingjar	Old Norse: Haddingjar	Possibly connected to the Hasdingi dynasty of the Vandals and the Heardingas of the Anglo-Saxons. Attempts have been made to connect them to the deities known as the Alcis as well.	The name is the plural of the Odinic hero Haddingus, see below.	They appear in Norse traditions of Germanic heroic poetry. They were the youngest of twelve brothers and it was only when they were together that they had the strength of a single man.		Gesta danorum V, Hrómundar saga Grípsonar, Guðrúnarkviða II (28), Hervarar saga 3, Orvar-Odd's saga 29, Hyndluljóð 23,	
Haddingus	Latin: Haddingus	See above.	The name is identical to that of the Vandalic Hasdingi and they are derived from PGmc *hazda- meaning "long hair as on women". It is a reference to an early tradition on the sacrificial hair of the warriors of Odin.	In the Icelandic sources, he always appears with his twin as the Haddingjar, and he had an important position in Scandinavian poetry. He is a typical Odinic hero who is aided by Odin in his many battles, and in the end he spectacularly sacrifices himself to Odin. There are structural similarities between Haddingus and another Odinic hero, king Harald Wartooth, which has led to speculations on how the traditions may be related.		Gesta Danorum (I)	
Hadd the Hardy	Old Norse: Haddr Harði, Latin: Haddir		See the etymology of Haddingus, above.	He appears at the massive Battle of Brávellir as one of the Swedish king Sigurd Ring's warriors in the battle against the Danish king Harald Wartooth. He was one of the archers sent from Telemark, and the Swedes expected little from these archers that they held to be slow speaking drawlers. During the battle, Ubbi, on the Danish side, cleared a path in his wake with one sword in each hand and blood up to his shoulders. Having killed six champions and wounded 11, he went straight for the archers, so Hadd and Hroald shot 24 arrows in chest and killed him, which took a while. In Gesta Danorum, the archers are described a brave but humble. Seeing Ubbi having killed 25 champions and wounded 11 among the Swedes and the Geats, Haddir, Roald and Grettir stopped the massacre by showering the warrior with arrows and he died having been riddled with 144 arrows, an event that turned the battle against the Danes.		Sögubrot, Gesta Danorum (VIII)	
Hadeburg and Sieglinde	Middle High German: Hadeburc and Middle High German: Sigelint	Likely derived from folk belief.	The first element of Haduburg is PGmc *haþu- ("fight"), second element PGmc *burgi, related to Gothic bairgan ("to save, protect"). For the etymology of Sieglinde, see Sieglinde.	Two mermaids dwelling in the Danube. Hagen/Högni^{1} steals their clothes and forces them to prophecy the future of the Burgundians at Attila's court. In the Þiðreks saga, he then cuts them in half.			Nibelungenlied, Þiðreks saga
Hadubrand	Old High German: Hadubrant or Haðubrant, later German Alebrant, Old Norse: Alibrandr		*Haduz or *Hadō mean "battle", and the second element "sword" or "conflagration". The name "Alebrand" has a first element PGmc *ali- ("different, other").	Son of Hildebrand^{1}. In the original legend, Hildebrand^{1} probably kills him when his son does not recognize him and insists on fighting him (as alluded to in Ásmundar saga kappabana), but in later versions the two are reconciled.		Ásmundar saga kappabana (unnamed).	Hildebrandslied, Þiðreks saga, Jüngeres Hildebrandslied
Hagal	Old Norse: Hagall		The name means "the skillful", from PGmc *χaʒaz ("handy, skillful"). It may be attested as Hagala on the Kragehul spear shaft.	Hagal was the foster-father of Helgi Hundingsbane. When Helgi had spied in the hall of Hunding, he revealed himself on purpose to Hunding's son Heming by telling a shepherd that he was the man they had thought was Hamal, Hagal's son. As Helgi was Hagal's foster-son, Hunding sent a search party to Hagal led by his evil counsellor Blind. Helgi disguised himself as a female thrall and started grinding the quern. When Blind saw him, he commented that the thrall woman had hard eyes. Hagal answered him that the woman was a Valkyrie and a sister of Sigar and Högni that Helgi had taken captive. Helgi escaped, got on a warship and killed Hunding.		Helgakviða Hundingsbana II	
Hagathio				See Aldrian^{1}			
Hagbard^{1}	Old Norse: Hagbarðr		An originally continental Germanic name (Old High German Hagupart), from the noun *hag- ("paddock, fenced area") or the adjective *hag- ("comfortable, skilled") and *barð- ("beard").	The son of Hámundr and the brother of Haki^{1}, he is mentioned in several sources both as a sea-king and as the hero of the Romeo and Juliet couple Hagbard and Signy.		Skáldskaparmál, Ynglinga saga (22), Ynglingatal (9, 12), Vellekla (26), Nafnaþulur (Ia2), Gesta Danorum (VII), Völsunga saga (XXV)	
Hagbard^{2}	Old Norse: Hagbarðr		See Hagbard^{1}	Hagbard was the son of a king named Hunding who was killed by Sigmund's son Helgi, who thus earned himself the cognomen Hundingsbane. Hunding's sons attacked Helgi but were defeated and killed. The Völsunga saga names his sons Alf^{2} and Eyjolf, Hervard^{2} and Hagbard^{2}, but Helgakviða Hundingsbana I and II the names Hjorvard^{3} and Havard appear instead of Hervard^{2} and Hagbard^{2}. Helgakviða Hundingsbana II adds a brother named Heming, and the Völsunga saga adds yet another brother called king Lyngvi who killed Sigmund in battle.		Völsunga saga	
Hagen/Högni^{1}	Old English: Hagena, Old Norse: Hǫgni, Middle High German: Hagen(e) von Tronege	Not historical.	Disputed, possibly based on PGmc *hag- "hedge", a proposed PGmc *haganaz (breeding animal/boar), or related to ON hagr ("service"). Hag- also means "fenced area" so it may mean "protector".	In the German tradition, vassal of Gunther and friend of Walthar of Aquitaine. The Þiðreks saga, the son of a demon and Gunnarr's half-brother. In the Norse tradition, brother of Gunnarr. In Waltharius, Hagen was a hostage at Attila's court. He refuses to help Gunther against his friend Walter of Aquitaine until the latter has killed Hagen's nephew; Hagen loses an eye and six teeth in the fight, but cuts off Walter's right arm. In the Nibelungenlied, Hagen helps Brunhild plot against Siegfried/Sigurd after Kriemhild has publicly humiliated her. With Gunther's permission, he kills Siegfried by stabbing him in the back. He has Siegfried's treasure sunk in the Rhine. When the Burgundians have gone to Attila's hall, Hagen kills Attila's son after hearing of Bleda's attack on the Burgundian squires. He is captured by Dietrich von Bern and Kriemhild beheads him. In the Norse tradition, Högni refuses to attack Sigurd because they have sworn oaths. When Attila invites them to his hall, he predicts disaster but goes anyway. He has his heart cut out by the Huns. In the Þiðreks saga, he pursues the fleeing Walter of Aquitaine on Attila's orders.	Waldere	Grípisspá, Brot af Sigurðarkviðu, Sigurðarkviða hin skamma, Dráp Niflunga, Guðrúnarkviða II, Guðrúnarkviða III, Oddrúnargrátr, Atlakviða, Atlamál, Skáldskaparmál, Völsunga saga, Norna-Gests þáttr	Waltharius, Nibelungenlied, Þiðreks saga, Walther und Hildegund, Rosengarten zu Worms,
Hagen/Högni^{2}	Old English: Hagena, Old Norse: Hǫgni, Middle High German: Hagen(e), Latin: Höginus (Gesta Danorum)	Possibly a historical figure from around the Baltic Sea c. 4th century. If the etymology "gardian" is correct, it's possible that he was originally identical with Hagen/Högni^{1}.	See Hagen/Högni^{1}	Father of Hildr^{1}. He fights Heoden when the latter kidnaps his daughter. In Widsith he is king of the "Island-Rugians" (Old English: Holmryg[as], but in other sources his people are called by his own name. In Kudrun, he is the son of the king of Ireland; as a child he is carried off by a gryphon to an island. He kills the gryphon and rescues three princess, later becoming a harsh ruler. Later, he keeps his daughter Hildr in strict seclusion and fights against the forces of Heoden when the latter abducts her; he is later reconciled to the marriage. Hagen's refusal of his daughter to Heoden (Etene) is also recounted in Dukus Horant. In Norse sources, he fights Heoden and each night the dead are resurrected by Hildr so that the battle is unending.	Widsith, Deor	Sörla þáttr, Ragnarsdrápa, Gesta Danorum, Skíðaríma, Skáldskaparmál	Kudrun, Dukus Horant
Haki^{1}	Old Norse: Haki, Latin: Haco		The name Haki means "hook", from PGmc *χakōn ("hook").	The most well-known legendary hero named Haki was the brother of Hagbard^{1} and avenged him by killing the Danish king Sigar. Sigar's son Sigvaldi chased him away, however. Ynglinga saga relates that with the help of Starkad, he attacked king Hugleik on the Fyrisvellir and killed him and his sons, after which he ruled Sweden for three years. Eventually, Hugleik's cousins Erik and Jorund, who were the sons of the former king Yngvi^{1}, attacked him. He managed to kill Erik and make Jorund flee the battle, but he was mortally wounded. He had a ship loaded with the fallen men and their weapons, and had a bonfire on the ship. He laid himself on the bonfire and steered the burning ship out on the sea, a death that was praised for a long time.		Ynglinga saga (22), Nafnaþulur, Völsunga saga (XXV), Gesta Danorum (VII)	
Haki^{2} the Bold	Old Norse: Haki enn frœkni	Not authentic, but borrowed from another legend.	See Haki^{1}	One of Hrólfr kraki's champions.		Hrólfs saga kraka	
Haki^{3} Cut-Cheek	Old Norse: Haki, Latin: Haco		See Haki^{1}	He appears at the massive Battle of Brávellir as one of the Danish king Harald Wartooth's warriors in the battle against the Swedish king Sigurd Ring. He was a great champion and before Starkad killed him, he managed to inflict such wounds on the giant warrior that Starkad received a deep cut between shoulders and neck so one could see what was inside, and on his chest his lungs were falling out, and he lost a right hand finger. In Gesta Danorum, Haco is called the "bravest of the Danes", and cut Starkad's neck to the middle, cut his chest so a lung stuck out and cut off one of Starkad's fingers, of the which the wound took a very long time to heal.		Sögubrot, Gesta Danorum (VIII)	
Haki^{4} the Hadeland Berserk	Old Norse: Haki Haðaberserkr		See Haki^{1}	In Ragnars saga loðbrókar and Hálfdanar saga svarta, Haki was a berserker from Hadeland who killed Sigurd Hart, the son of Sigurd Snake-in-the-Eye, while the latter was out hunting. Then he went to Sigurd's home in Ringerike and captured his daughter Raghnild and son Gutthorm^{2}. He intended to marry the 15-year-old girl but being severely wounded the wedding was postponed. In the winter, Halfdan the Black came and took Ragnhild and Gutthorm^{2} and set fire to Haki's hall killing his men. Haki survived and pursued them until he came to lake Mjøsa, where he committed suicide by falling on his own sword.		Ragnarssona þáttr, Hálfdanar saga svarta	
Hakon	Old Norse: Hákon		The etymology is contested but the first element is probably from PN Hā- which is from *hanha (probably "horse") or *hauha ("high") and the second element is konr ("son", "descendant"). It may also be the same name as OE Hæþcyn, from PN *Haþukunja.	A king of Denmark. Gudrun stays with him and his daughter Thora for three years after Sigurd's death.		Guðrúnarkviða I, Guðrúnarkvíða II, Völsunga saga	
Haklangr	Old Norse: Haklangr	The name is West Norse and borrowed by the Icelandic saga author from a Norwegian petty king who opposed Harald Fairhair.	The name may mean "cleft lip and cleft palate", or "long-chinned".	One of Hrólfr kraki's champions.		Hrólfs saga kraka	
Half	Old Norse: Hálfr, Hǫalfr, Hǫ́lfr	The legend is attested as early as the 9th c. (Ynglingatal), but the references to the legend are stereotypical which suggests that little of it had survived by the time the sagas were written.	The first element há- may have three different derivations in PN: *hanha- ("horse"?), *hauha- ("high") or *haþu- ("battle"), while the second element is -ulfr ("wolf") from PN wulfaʀ. The name Haþuwulfaʀ ("battle wolf") is attested on the Istaby Runestone and the Stentoften Runestone.	Half is one of the most famous sea-kings from Scandinavian legends. His warriors, the Halfsrekkar, had to submit to harsh rules. After 18 years of successful pillaging, he returned to Hordaland, where his step-father Asmund had ruled in his absence. His step-father received him courteously, swore him allegiance, and invited him and half his warband to a feast in his hall. However, at night, he set fire hall, but the drunk men managed to escape only to be cut down, except for two warriors, Utsteinn and Hrok the Black. The two warriors escaped and joined Half's maternal grandfather Sölvi on Nærøya, who helped them attack Asmund and kill him. They then instated Half's son Hjör as the king of Hordaland. He is probably also mentioned in Hyndluljóð, in the Poetic Edda, as Half the Hero, the son of Hildr, as Hálfs saga calls him the son of Hildr and Hjörleif. It also mentions his warrior Innstein.		Hálfs saga ok Hálfsrekka, Hyndluljóð, mentioned in kennings in other sources	
Half^{2}	Old Norse: Hálfr		See Half, above.	See Alf^{3}, who is called Hálfr in Frá dauða Sinfjǫtla, Guðrúnarkviða II and in ch. 38 of Völsunga saga.			
Halfdan the Black	Old Norse: Halfdanr Svarti		PN *Halbadaniz means "half Dane", i.e. with one of the parents Danish.	According to legendary sources, he was the son of Gudrød the Hunter of Romerike. He was only one year old when his father died and his brother Olaf Geirstad-Alf became king, but the kingdom partly disintegrated when chiefdoms broke loose. Halfdan was raised by his mother Åsa Haraldsdottir of Agder^{2} and he became the king of Agder at 18, and also became co-king with his brother over Vestfold. Harald conquered Toten, Land, Hadeland, Romerike and Hedmark. With his first wife, he had a son, Harald, and when both his son and father-in-law Harald Goldbeard had died, he inherited Sogn. With his other consort, Ragnhild daughter of Sigurd Hart, he had the son Harald Fairhair. Halfdan died by going through the ice of Randsfjord. Ringerike, Romerike, Vestfold and Hedmark split his body in four parts each to bury so that the good harvests that had followed his reign would continue in their own districts.		Historia Norwegiæ, Saga Hálfdanar svarta, Þáttr Ólafs Geirstaða álfs, Fagrskinna, Ágrip, Ragnarssona þáttr	
Halfdan the Mild	Old Norse: Hálfdan hinn mildi ok hinn matarilli		See Halfdan the Black.	Halfdan was the son of Eystein Halfdansson and he succeeded his father as king of Vestfold. He was called Halfdan the Mild, because he was generous, but he was also called hinn matarilli because he was stingy with food. He starved his men but gave them as much gold as other lords gave silver. He was a great warrior and spent a long time raiding. His wife was Hlíf, the daughter of king Dagr of Vestmarir (in modern Vestfold). His preferred to stay at his estate Holt in Vestfold, where he died from illness, and he was buried at Borre. His son was Gudrød the Hunter.		Íslendingabók, Ynglingatal, Af Upplendinga konungum, Historia Norwegiæ, Ynglinga saga	
Halfdan the Valiant	Old Norse: Hálfdan snjalli		See Halfdan the Black.	Halfdan the Valiant is reported to have been great-grandson of Hrothgar from Beowulf, through his father Harald the Old, and grandfather Valdar. In addition, he is the father of Ivar Vidfamne. According to Hervarar saga his wife was Hildr^{3}, daughter of Heidrek Wolfskin, but according to Hversu his wife was instead Hervor daughter of Heidrek.		Hervarar saga, Ynglinga saga, Hversu Noregr byggðist, ch. III	
Halfdan Whiteshanks	Old Norse: Hálfdan hvítbeinn		See Halfdan the Black.	Halfdan was the son of Olof Trätälja by his wife Sölva (or Sölveig) and the brother of Ingjald. Halfdan was raised by his maternal uncle Sölvi in Solør. When the more intelligent of the Swedish settlers in Värmland realized that the famine was due to overpopulation, they migrated west to Solør, proclaimed Halfdan as their king and he took possession of the land. With the Swedish reinforcements, he conquered Romerike. He became a powerful king and married Ása, the daughter of Eysteinn hinn harðráði (the Hard Ruler) of the Upplanders and the ruler of Hedmark. Halfdan and Åsa^{2} had two sons, Eysteinn and Guðrøðr. Halfdan took over a large part of Hedmark, Toten, Hadeland and a great deal of the Westfold, and when his brother Ingjald died, he took over Värmland as well. He died of old age and was buried near Skiringssal. The Historia Norwegiæ makes no connection with Olof Trätälja and only says that Halfdan was elected king when he returned from Sweden. Elias Wessén notes the discontinuity between the Yngling naming tradition of Olof and the names of Harald and his descendants who have typical chieftain names.		Af Upplendinga konungum, Ynglinga saga, Yngligatal, Historia Norwegiæ	
Halga	Old English: Hālga, Old Norse: Helgi, Latin: Helgo		PN *hailaga ("holy", "consecrated to the gods").	Son of the Scylding Halfdan (Healfdene). He and his brother Hroar (Hrothgar) divided the kingdom between each other, and Halga warred with king Adils (Eadgils) of Sweden. Not knowing that Yrsa was his daughter they had the famous Hrolf Kraki. As Saxo said he killed a Hunding, Bugge identified him with Helgi Hundingsbane, but this is rejected or ignored by others.	Beowulf	Chronicon Lethrense and Annales Lundenses, Gesta danorum, Hrólfs saga kraka, Skjöldunga saga, Bjarkarímur	
Háma^{1}				See Heime/Heimir^{1}			
Hamal	Old Norse: Hamall		The name is derived from hamalt which only has one attested use and that is as a synonym for "pig's snout", when referring to arranging the troops in wedge formation. Hollander translates the name as "castrated male sheep or goat".	Hamal was son of Hagal and the foster-brother of Helgi Hundingsbane. When Helgi had spied in the hall of Hunding, he revealed himself on purpose to Hunding's son Heming by telling a shepherd that he was the man they had thought was Hamal, Hagal's son. As Helgi was Hagal's foster-son, Hunding sent a search party to Hagal led by his evil counsellor Blind. Helgi disguised himself as a female thrall and started grinding the quern. When Blind saw him, he commented that the thrall woman had hard eyes. Hagal answered him that the woman was a Valkyrie and a sister of Sigar and Högni that Helgi had taken captive. Helgi escaped, got on a warship and killed Hunding.		Helgakviða Hundingsbana II	
Hámundr	Old Norse: Hámundr		The first element is probably from PN Hā- which is from *hanha (probably "horse") or *hauha ("high"), and the second is -mundr from PN -munduʀ ("protector").	Mentioned as the son of Sigmund and the younger brother of Helgi Hundingsbane and Sinfjötli, in the Poetic Edda and in the Völsunga saga which adds that his mother was Borghild^{1}. Apparently the same character is also mentioned in the Völsunga saga (by Brynhild and Gudrun) and in Gesta Danorum (VII) as the father of Haki^{1} and Hagbard^{1}. Gesta Danorum adds that he had two other sons who were killed early in the feud with Sigar, Helwin and Hamund.		Frá dauða Sinfjötla (Poetic Edda), Norna-Gests þáttr, Völsunga saga, Gesta Danorum (VII)	
Hamdir	Old Norse: Hamðir, Latin: Ammius (Getica) or Harnidus (Annals of Quedlinburg)	Not historical.	Hamðir is from an older Hamþer, from PN *Hama-þewaʀ. Jordanes' form Ammius is a hypocoristic form of Gothic Hama-þius. The name means "armoured warrior", and is cognate with OHG Hamadeo and Hamideo.	In the Norse tradition, Hamdir and Sörli are sons of Gudrun, and the half-brothers of Svanhildr (through their mother Gudrun) and Erpr^{2} (through their father Jonakr). At Gudrun's urging, they set off to kill Ermanaric in revenge for his killing of Svanhildr. When Hamdir and Sörli encounter Erpr^{2}, they kill him thinking he will not help them, but this means they only maim Ermanaric, who has them killed.	Getica	Ragnarsdrápa, Guðrúnarhvöt, Hamðismál, Völsunga saga	Annals of Quedlinburg
Harald	Old Norse: Haraldr		The first element of Haraldr is from PGmc *harjaz ("host") and the second one is from PGmc -waldaz ("ruler").	A king of the Goths who receives Heidrek in his kingdom. After Heidrek has helped him against two subordinate jarls, he gives him half the kingdom and his daughter Helga. After a while Harald has a son in old age, and Heidrek has Angantýr^{1}. During a famine, the lots are cast which say that the most prominent son has to be sacrificed to Odin, both men claiming that it refers to the other one's son. Heidrek accepts that it is his own son that is to be sacrificed on condition that he is given command over half of the army (or every fourth man). This granted he orders the attack and kills both Harald and his son, claiming afterwards that all the slain were sacrificed to Odin, and he is then king of the Goths.		Hervarar saga	
Harald Red-Beard	Old Norse: Haraldr inn granrauði		For the etymology of Haraldr see above.	In Ynglinga saga, king Harald Red-Beard of Agder was the father of Åsa^{2}, and he refused to give his daughter to Gudrød the Hunter of Vestfold. The latter would not accept the refusal, and so he attacked Harald's hall in the night and killed both Harald and his son Gyrðr. Gudrød took Åsa^{2} by force and with her he had the son Halfdan the Black. In revenge, Åsa^{2} made her servant kill Gudrød with a spear at a banquet, as he was walking down the gangway from his ship. She openly admitted to having asked her servant to do so.		Ynglinga saga	
Harald the Old	Old Norse: Haraldr inn gamli		For the etymology of Haraldr see above.	Only mentioned in Hversu Noregr byggðist, ch. III as the son of Valdar^{1}, and the grandson of Hrothgar. Harald married Hervor, the daughter of Heidrek, and he was the father of Halfdan the Valiant.		Hversu Noregr byggðist, ch. III	
Harald Wartooth	Old Norse: Haraldr hilditǫnn, Latin: Haraldus Hyldetan	Historical existence uncertain, but the Battle of Brávellir may reflect battles in the fifth and sixth centuries between Danes and Swedes.	For the etymology of Haraldr see above. The epithet hilditǫnn means "tusk", cf. hilde-tux in Beowulf.	He was a legendary Danish king and the son of the Lejre king Hrœrekr Ringslinger with Auðr the Deep-Minded, the daughter of Ivar Vidfamne. According to Saxo Grammaticus (the author of Gesta Danorum), he was a descendant of the Geatish Siklings. When Ivar had killed his father, his mother fled with him to Gardariki, from where he returned after Ivar's death. From his kingdom in Zealand or Scania, he conquered Scandinavia and Northern Germany. When he was old, he met Sigurd Ring, his kinsman and viceroy in Uppsala in the massive Battle of the Brávellir. On Sigurd's side fought the Swedes, many Geats and people from what today is Norway, while Harald led other Scandinavians as well as Frisians and Slavs. Harald fell in the battle.		Chronicon Lethrense, Gesta danorum (VII), Hervarar saga, Sögubrot af nokkrum fornkonungum	
Harðrefill	Old Norse: Harðrefill	Fictive.	The name is probably not authentic, but composed of the West Norse names Harðrefr (a person from Landanamabók) and Refill (a sea-king).	One of Hrólfr kraki's champions.		Hrólfs saga kraka	
Harek Wand/Wolf		Old Norse: Hárekr gandr	The first element has several origins, PN *hauha- ("high"), *haþu- ("battle") and *hanha- ("horse"?). The second element is from PGmc *rīkia- ("powerful", "prominent", "rich").	Harek was sent by Halfdan the Black with a hundred men to capture the 15 year old Raghnild and her younger brother Gutthorm^{2} at the homestead of the berserker Haki^{4} in Hadeland. They closed the door of the hall where Haki's men were asleep and set it aflame killing everyone inside. Then they went to the house where Haki slept with the girl and the boy and took them away. Haki fell on his own sword seeing the sleigh disappear with them over the ice.		Ragnarssona þáttr, Hálfdanar saga svarta	
Harlungen (pl.)	Old English: Herelingas, Middle High German: Harlunge; the Annals of Quedlinburg name the brothers as Embrica and Fritla, Biterolf and Dietleib as Middle High German: Imbreke and Fritele. These names correspond to Old English: Emerca and Fridla in Widsith. In the Þiðreks saga, they are named Old Norse: Egarð and Áki.	Possible connection to the Wild Hunt.	"Belonging to the race or kin of Harilo" or "men of the army (OHG hari)". The name Emerca from a form *ambr-, possibly a form of *amal (Amal dynasty). The name Fritla/Fritele is probably a hypocoristic form of names beginning with PGmc *friðu ("peace") with the diminutive suffix -ilo. The name Egarð is probably from the German Eckehart (see Eckehart), while the name Áki is probably from the figure of Hache.	Nephews of Ermanaric and cousins of Dietrich von Bern and wards of Eckehart. They are listed among Ermanaric's men in Widsith. In German sources, Ermanaric has them killed by hanging, urged on by the machinations of Sibeche and Ribestein, and seizes their land and gold. In the Heldenbuch-Prosa, Eckehart avenges them by killing Ermanaric. In the Þiðreks saga, they are the sons of Ermanaric's half-brother Aki Aurlungatrausti (see Hache) and are the fosterchildren of Witige; Sibeche has his wife, whom Ermanaric has raped, accuse them of raping her, so that Ermanaric kills them.	Widsith	Gesta Danorum (as unnamed nephews killed by Iarmanaricus)	Annals of Quedlinburg, Þiðreks saga, Dietrichs Flucht, Rosengarten zu Worms, Biterolf und Dietleib, Heldenbuch-Prosa.
Hæreð	Old English: Hæreð		The OE pl. form Hæredas refers to the ON Hǫrðar (Latin Harudes), a name which is probably related to *χaruþaz (OE harað) meaning "forest". The personal name is attested as Haruðr (OWN:Hǫrðr) on the Rök runestone, haruþs (gen).	Hygd's father.	Beowulf		
Hárr the hard-gripping	Old Norse: Hárr enn harðgreipi	Probably fictive.	Hárr means "one-eyed" from PGmc *χaiχaz, or "hoary" from PGmc *χairaz.	One of Hrólfr kraki's champions. He is mentioned in one of the few surviving stanzas from Bjarkamál that were recited at dawn before the Battle of Stiklestad, and they concern the last battle of Hrólfr kraki and the Skjöldungs: Hárr the Hard-gripper,/Hrólfr the Marksman,/Noble-born warriors/Who never will flee!/Not for wine do I wake you /Nor for women's lore,/Nay, I wake you for warfare,/The hard battle-play.		Bjarkamál	
Hartmut von Normandie	Middle High German: Hartmuot von Ormandîe		First element PGmc *hardu- ("hard"), second element PGmc *mōda- ("mind, courage").	Spurned suitor for Kudrun; he abducts her with the help of his father Ludwig while the Heodingas are dealing with an attack from Siegfried von Mooren. Kudrun refuses to marry him after her capture and is mistreated by his mother Gerlind. When the Heodingas besiege the Normans, he prevents Gerlind from having Kudrun killed. In the peace arranged after the Normans defeat, Hartmut marries Kudrun's handmaiden Hildeburg^{2}.			Kudrun, Bitterwolf und Dietleib
Hartung, Hartunch	Latin: Hartunc[h]		For the first element, see Hartmut, above.	A dwarf captured by Ruodlieb, he is the son of the dwarf king Immung, and the father of Heriburg, whom Ruodlieb marries.			Ruodlieb
Hartvin	Old Norse: Hartvin		The first element is PGmc *hardu ("hard"), the second element is PGmc *wini ("friend").	One of king Sigmund's vassals: while the king is away he attempts to seduce the pregnant queen Sisibe (Sieglinde). When she refuses, he and Herman accuse the queen of adultery, and Sigmund orders them to kill the queen. Herman kills Hartvin in order to save the queen's life, and she escapes.			Þiðreks saga
Hati	Old Norse: Hati		Hati means "hateful".	In Helgakvíða Hjörvarðssonar, Hati was a giant that was killed by its hero Helgi Hjörvarðsson, at a fjord named after the giant. Hati's daughter Hrímgerth is upset and starts a raunchy flyting contest with Helgi and his companion Atli^{2} that ends with Hrimgreth being caught by sunrise and turning to stone.		Helgakvíða Hjörvarðssonar	
Hæþcyn	Old English: Hæþcyn	In spite of correspondences, there is no consensus on whether Hæþcyn and his brother Herebeald are the origin of the myth of Hǫðr and Baldr, or based on them.	The first element in Hæþcyn (PN *Haþukunʀ) is Haþu-, which the same as the Norse theonym Hǫðr ("battle") while the second element is an OE adaptation of PN *kuniʀ. (*kuni- from *kunja meaning "clan"). It may also be from PN *Haþukunja, and the same name as ON Hákon, above.	The Geatish prince Hæþcyn accidentally kills his brother Herebeald with an arrow, and their father king Hrēðel dies from grief. Hæþcyn becomes king, but Eadgils and Ohthere, the sons of the Swedish king Ongenþeow, attack the Geats in Hreosna hill. Later the battle is taken to the Swedes and the Swedish king Ongenþeow rescues his queen from Hæþcyn and kills him at Raven's wood. The following day, the third brother Hygelac arrives and his warrior Eofor kills the Swedish king, and is given Hygelac's daughter as a reward. Hygelac succeeds Hæþcyn and becomes king of the Geats. They also have an unnamed sister who married Ecgþēow, Beowulf's father.	Beowulf		
Havard	Old Norse: Hávarðr		The etymology is contested but the first element is probably from PN Hā- which is from *hanha (probably "horse") or *hauha ("high") and the second element is *warduz ("guard, protector").	Havard was the son of a king named Hunding who was killed by Sigmund's son Helgi, who thus earned himself the cognomen Hundingsbane. Helgakviða Hundingsbana I tells that Helgi refused to give his sons compensation, and so they attacked him but were defeated and killed. In Helgakviða Hundingsbana I and II the brothers are named Alf^{2} and Eyjolf, Hjorvard^{3} and Havard, but in The Völsunga saga, the names Hervard^{2} and Hagbard^{2} appear instead of Hjörvard and Havard. Helgakviða Hundingsbana II adds a brother named Heming, and the Völsunga saga adds yet another brother called king Lyngvi who killed Sigmund in battle.		Helgakviða Hundingsbana I, Helgakviða Hundingsbana II	
Hawart	Middle High German: Hâwart		The first element hâ- could be a contraction of *haga ("fenced in area," or "comfortable, suitable"), *hab ("possession"), *ham- ('"skin, hide, exterior appearance), or *haw, related to OS hauwan ("to strike"). The second element is PGmc *wardu ("guard").	An exiled Dane living at Attila's court, associated with Iring. He attacks the Burgundians to avenge Iring's death and is killed by Hagen. In Biterolf und Dietleib, he is involved in Attila's war against the Poles and later fights in the tournament against the Burgundians.			Nibelungenlied, Nibelungenklage, Biterolf und Dietleib

== He ==
Figure	Names in medieval languages	Historical origin	Name meaning	Relationships	Early and English Attestations	Norse Attestations	German Attestations
Heaðolaf	Old Norse: Heaðolāf		From PN *Haþulaibaz, where the first element is from *haþō meaning "battle" and the second element from *-laibaz meaning "descendant" or "heir".	Heaðolaf was a Wulfing who was killed by Ecgþeow, who probably belonged to Scylfings, the Swedish royal dynasty. Ecgþeow had to seek the protection of the Danish king Hroðgar, who paid the wergild for him.	Beowulf		
Healfdene	Old English: Healfdene, Old Norse: Halfdan, Latin: Halfdanus or Haldanus		PN *Halbadaniz means "half Dane", i.e. with one of the parents Danish.	In Beowulf, Healfdene is the son of Beow, and the father of Heorogar, Hroðgar, Halga and a daughter who is married to Onela, but in Ynglinga saga, he drives away king Aun and rules as the king of Sweden until he dies. In the Skjöldunga saga, there are two Halfdanus, and one corresponds to Healfdene in Beowulf. His father Fróði subjugated king Jorund of Sweden and raped his daughter which resulted in Healfdene, who had a claim on the Swedish throne. In Gesta Danorum, there are four Halfdans, of whom the first is the father of Hrothgar/Roe and Halga/Helgo, and number two and three are the same character, and defeat the Swedes, and number two and four become kings of Sweden. Clarke points out that if Healfdene of Beowulf was buried at Uppsala it would give the Scyldings a claim to Swedish throne and it would explain his son Halga's and grandson Hroðulf/Hrólfr kraki's expeditions to Sweden and their hostility with its king Eadgils.	Beowulf	Skjöldinga saga, Ynglinga saga, Gesta Danorum, Hyndluljóð (14)	
Heardred	Old English: Heardrēd		PN *Hardurādaz, from *hardu- ("hard") and an agent noun of ON ráða ("to give advice").	King of the Geats, and the son of king Hygelac, Heardred offers sanctuary to the renegade Swedish princes Eadgils (Aðils) and Eanmund after their uncle Onela (Áli) becomes the king of Sweden. This incurs the wrath of Onela who attacks the Geats and both Heardred and Eanmund are killed. Onela leaves Beowulf as the king of the Geats, who however avenges Heardred by supporting Eadgils in the Battle on the Ice.	Beowulf		
Hedin (for another Hedin, see Heoden)	Old Norse: Heðinn		The name is an abbreviation of Ulfheðinn which means "wolfcoat" or "werewolf", see also Heoden, above.	In Helgakvíða Hjörvarðssonar, Hedin is the son of Hjörvard^{4}, a king in Norway, with his wife Alfhild^{2}. Hjörvard^{4} also had a son named Humlung with his wife Særeith, a son named Hymling with his wife Sinrióth, and a son named Helgi with his wife Sigrlinn. Hedin's half-brother Helgi married the Valkyrie Sváfa^{1}, and avenged his maternal grandfather Svafnir of Svavaland by killing Svafnir's murderer king Hrothmar. One Yule as Hedin was riding home, he met a troll-woman riding in a wolf with reins of snakes. He rejected her request to accompany him, so she cursed him that he would regret it when he drank the bragarfull. Later when he put his hand on the sacred boar and made the holy toast, he said that he would have his brother Helgi's wife Sváfa, which he immediately regretted. When he met his brother, Helgi told him that he might soon die killed in a duel by Hrothmar's son Alf^{7}. As Helgi later lay dying he asked Svafa to marry Hedin, but Hedin told Svafa to kiss him and that she would not see him again until he has avenged Helgi.		Helgakvíða Hjörvarðssonar	
Heidrek	Old Norse: Heiðrekr, possibly Old English: Heaþoric.	Unknown, possibly a historical figure from modern Ukraine.	Heiðrekr means "king of the heathlands (the steppe)".	He is the son of Höfund, and the grandson of Gudmund of Glæsisvellir. His mother is the shieldmaiden Hervor^{2}. He unintentionally kills his own brother, at a feast, and so he is banished but is given the cursed sword Tyrfing by his mother. He enters the service of Harald, the king of the Goths and marries his daughter Helga. With a ruse he both saves his son with Helga, Angantýr^{3}, and takes over the kingdom. He kidnaps the Hunnish princess Sifka whom he rapes then sends back pregnant with Hlöd, to be raised by Sifka's father Humli. With the daughter of Hrollaugr, the king Garðar (Rus'), he has the daughter Hervor^{1} He is killed by thralls, in the Carpathians, but is avenged by his son Angantýr^{1} who takes back the cursed sword Tyrfing.	Possibly in Widsith	Hervarar saga	
Heidrek^{2}	Old Norse: Heiðrekr	Appears to be an invention of the poet.	For Heiðrekr, see above.	In the eddic poem Oddrúnargrátr, the father of Borgny. He is one of the vassals of Atli (Attila).		Oddrúnargrátr	
Heidrek^{3} Wolfskin	Old Norse: Heiðrekr úlfhamr		For Heiðrekr, see above.	According to the Hervarar saga, he was the son of the Gothic king Angantýr^{1}, and like him he ruled for a long time. He was the father of Hild^{3} who married Halfdan the Valiant, the father of Ivar Vidfamne. According to the Skjöldunga saga he could "turn into a wolf", but this could be figurative. In the 14th c. Þórsteins þáttr bæjarmagns he is the son of Gudmund of Glæsisvellir, and the grandson of Gudmund wolf pelt (Úlfhéðinn).		Hervarar saga, Skjöldunga saga, Sörla þáttr, Þórsteins þáttr bæjarmagns	
Heiðr^{1}	Old Norse: Heiðr		Heiðr means "shine" and "beauty".	Heiðr was a conventional name for a Völva, a prophetess.		Hrólfs saga kraka, Orvar-Odds saga, Hauks þáttr hábrókar, Landnamabók	
Heiðr^{2}	Old Norse: Heiðr, Latin: Hetha and Hedæ		See Heiðr, above.	In Sögubrot, she is a shield-maiden who appears together with the shield-maiden Visma (or Visina) on the Danish king Harald Wartooth's side at the massive Battle of Brávellir against the Swedish king Sigurd Ring. She holds one of Harald's flanks with her banner and commands 100 champions. She is also sent out with his right-hand man Bruni to reconnoitre the Swedish troops. In Gesta Danorum, she also leads 100 champions, and when the army has been positioned, she leads the right-hand flank, while Haki^{3} leads the left, and Visna holds the banner. She survives the battle and after the entreaties of the Danes, the Swedish king appoints her as the ruler of Denmark, but gives Scania to Ale the Strong. The latter cannot accept seeing a woman in such a powerful position so he conspires with her subjects, and takes over her territory and appoints her as his subordinate ruler of Jutland. The Danes later regret having helped him and contract Starkad to kill him. In Chronicon lethrense, Hedæ and Wysna are the two young women who were Harald's standard-bearers. After the battle, the Swedish king appoints Hedæ as the ruler of Denmark and she founds the town of Hedeby.		Sögubrot, Chronicon lethrense, Gesta Danorum (VIII)	
Heime/Heimir^{1}	Old English: Háma, Old Norse: Heimir, Middle High German: Heime		Derived from PGMc *haim- ("home")	Companion of Witige. The OE poem Widsith mentions Háma and Witege among Ermanaric's as exiles followers, while Beowulf mentions that Háma fled Ermanaric's wrath after stealing the necklace Brosingamen. In some sources he has four elbows. In several epics, he is the leader of Ermarnic's men fighting against Dietrich von Bern, and in Alpharts Tod he kills Alphart with Witiege. In several of the fantastical poems he is one of Dietrich's men. In the Þiðreks saga, he is the son of Brunhild's studmanager, Studas, and joins Dietrich von Bern after the latter defeats him in a fight. Heime lives as an outlaw after Ermanaric forces Dietrich into exile; after Ermanaric's death, he joins a monastery that he latter saves from a giant. When Dietrich finds him at the monastery, Heime kills the monks, but is later killed by another giant.	Widsith, Beowulf	See Heimir^{2}	Þiðreks saga, Dietrichs Flucht, Rabenschlacht, Alpharts Tod, Biterolf und Dietleib
Heimir^{2}	Old Norse: Heimir		See Heime^{1}	In Völsunga saga, Brynhild's foster-father, married to her sister Bekkhild and the father of Alsvid. He allows Brynhild to marry whom she wants, and he took care of Sigurd's and Brynhild's daughter Aslaug^{1}. He is killed by Áki.^{2}	See Heime^{1}	Grípispá, Helreið Brynhildar, Völsunga saga (24, 25, 29), Ragnars saga loðbrókar	See Heime^{1}
Helche	Old Norse: Herkja or Erka, Latin: Ospirin (in Waltharius), Middle High German: Helche	Possibly Attila's wife Kreka (in some instances spelled Erekan).	The names Helche/Herkja/Erka is based on the equivalent of OHG hari- ("army"). Otto Maenchen-Helfen argued that the Germanic forms represent an originally Hunnish name Erekan, from Turkic *arī(γ)-qan ("pure princess"). "Ospirin" means "heavenly bear" and has a first component PGmc *ans- (god), matching her father Oserich.	In the continental tradition, first wife of Attila. Daughter of Oserich. Her death in the Nibelungenlied percipates Attila's marriage to Kriemhild. In Dietrichs Flucht, she persuades Attila to help Dietrich von Bern against Ermanaric and has her niece Herrat married to her. When her sons are killed while on campaign with Dietrich in Rabenschlacht, Rüdiger persuades her to forgive him. She appears as Attila's concubine in Guðrúnarkviða III, where she accuses Gudrun of adultery and is killed when the latter accomplishes an ordeal. In the Þiðreks saga, she is abducted by Attila from her father.		Guðrúnarkviða III	Waltharius, Nibelungenlied, Þiðreks saga, Dietrichs Flucht, Rabenschlacht.
Helferich (Hjálprekr)	Middle High German: Helferîch, Helpfrîch, Old Norse: Hjálprekr	The name appears to derive from the Frankish ruler Chilperic I, however George Gillespie notes that the Norse character's role seems to be more based on his being "helpful" than on any historical origin.	First element from PGmc *hilp ("help"), second element PGmc *rīk- ("ruler, powerful").	One of Dietrich von Bern's vassals, although in the Eckenlied, his opponent. In the Þiðreks saga he is killed by Witige with the sons of Attila with Helche. George Gillespie counts four separate characters with this name, however Arnulf Krause regards them as the same. In the Norse tradition, he is a King of Denmark who helps Sigurd's mother Hjordis and has Sigurd raised by the smith Regin. In Reginsmál, he gives Sigurd a fleet and warriors so he can kill Lyngvi and avenge his father.		Reginsmál, Frá dauða Sinfjǫtla, Skáldskaparmál, Völsunga saga, Norna-Gests þáttr	Nibelungenlied, Þiðreks saga, Eckenlied, Dietrichs Flucht, Rabenschlacht, Alpharts Tod, Biterolf und Dietleib, Virginal
Helga	Old Norse: Helga		A feminine form of Helgi which is derived from the adjective heilagr meaning "holy" and "dedicated to the gods".	A Gothic princess and the daughter of king Harald, she is given to Heidrek together with half the Gothic kingdom. Together they have the son Angantýr^{1}. When Heidrek agrees to sacrifice their son Angantýr to Odin to avert a famine, he does so on condition that he is given temporary command of half (or a fourth of) the Gothic army. Instead, of performing the sacrifice, he attacks king Harald killing him and Helga's brother, claiming that all the slain were Odin's sacrifice. Helga is so furious with the deception and the death of her father and brother that she hangs herself in the temple of the goddess (Dís), perhaps Freyja (Vanadís).		Hervarar saga	
Helgi^{2}	Old Norse: Helgi		See Helga.	A king of the Huns and father, with Hildr^{2} of Hildebrand^{1} in Ásmundar saga kappabanna.		Ásmundar saga kappabanna	
Helgi Haddingjaskati	Old Norse: Helgi Haddingjaskati, Skati haddingja or Haddingjaskaði		For etymology, see Helga. Haddingjaskati or Haddingjaskaði means "warrior" or "lord" of the Haddings.	According to he Poetic Edda, Helgi and his lover, the Valkyrie Kára, were Helgi Hundingsbane and Sigrún reborn, who in turn were Helgi Hjörvarðsson and Sváfa reborn. Their story was told in the lost poem Káruljóð, which has partly survived by being used as material for the legendary saga Hrómundar saga Gripssonar. The saga tells that Helgi lost his brother Hröngvid who was killed by Hrómund in a battle at Elfasker, (the islands outside modern-day Gothenburg), and that later Helgi was in the service of the Haddings, the kings of Sweden. The two Haddings challenged a Danish king named Olaf to battle on the ice of lake Vänern, and as Hrómund was in Olaf's service, Helgi could meet him to avenge his brother. During the fight, Helgi was protected by the magic of Kára who was flying in the form of a swan above him. Accidentally, Helgi cut off her leg as he swung his sword into Hrómund, killing her, after which Hrómund killed Helgi. His horse Skæfaðr is mentioned in the Kalvsvísa in the Prose Edda.		Hrómundar saga Gripssonar, Helgakviða Hundingsbana II, Kálfsvísa (Skáldskaparmál, in the Prose Edda)	
Helgi Hildibrandsson	Old Norse: Helgi Hildibrandsson		For etymology, see Helga	Helgi is a Hunnish king, and the son of Hildibrand^{2}. He marries Hildr^{2}, the daughter of Buðli^{2}, the king of Sweden, and they have the son Hildibrand^{1} (Hildigerus) who is sent to be raised by his grandfather Hildibrandr^{2}. However, when Helgi is away pillaging, the aging king is attacked by Danes and killed by the Danish king Álfr^{4} and his champion Áki^{1}, and they take Hildr^{2} away. Áki^{1} marries Hildr^{2} and they have the son Ásmundr who will later kill Hildibrand^{1}. Later, it is said that Helgi has fallen while raiding.		Ásmunds saga kappabana	
Helgi Hjörvarðsson	Old Norse: Helgi Hjǫrvarðsson		For etymology, see Helga	Helgi was the son of the Norwegian king Hjörvard^{4} and the Suebian princess Sigrlinn. When he grew up no name would fit him and he was an ash lad until he met his love, the Valkyrie Sváfa, daughter of king Eylimi. She gave him his name and as a naming gift she told him where there was a damascened sword. She protected him during his battles, such as when he avenged his maternal grandfather king Svafnir by killing king Hrothmar and when he and his friend Atli^{2} had a flyting with a giantess. Later, they married and she stayed at home. However, a troll woman had put a curse on Helgi's brother Hedin so when he had drunk the bragarfull at Yule and put his hand on the sacrificial boar, he made the holy toast that he would have Sváfa as wife, which he immediately regretted. When he met his brother, Helgi told him that he might soon die killed in a duel by Hrothmar's son Alf^{7}, who wanted to avenge his father's death at Helgi's hands. As Helgi later lay dying he asked Svafa to marry Hedin, but Hedin told Svafa to kiss him and that she would not see him again until he had avenged his brother. Helgi and Sváfa were reborn as Helgi Hundingsbane and Sigrún.		Helgakviða Hjörvarðssonar, Helgakviða Hundingsbana I	
Helgi Hundingsbane	Old Norse: Helgi Hundingsbani		For etymology, see Helga	Helgi and Hamund were the sons of Sigmund and Borghild^{1}. Helgi was visited by the Norns at his birth, and he earned himself the cognomen Hundingsbane, by killing a king named Hunding and Helgakviða Hundingsbana I adds that Helgi was only 15 years old. The lay tells that he refused to give Hunding's sons compensation, and so they attacked him but were defeated and killed. Helgakviða Hundingsbana II adds the backstory that Helgi had been sent to be raised by a man named Hagal. As Hunding was at war with Sigmund, Helgi went to Hunding's hall to spy and escaped dressed as a female servant. Helgi went to a warship and after that he killed Hunding. Then he met a Valkyrie named Sigrún who was the daughter of king Högni^{3}, but betrothed to Hothbrodd, the son of king Granmar. The lays and the saga deal with how he battled against Granmar's sons and married her. However, the second lay tells that soon Sigrún's brother Dag avenged their father by piercing Helgi with a spear at Fjoturlund, that after his death Helgi visited her one last time, and that when Helgi met Hunding at Valhalla, he humiliated him by having him do menial chores. The Poetic Edda says that Helgi and Sigrún were Helgi Hjörvarðsson and the Valkyrie Sváfa reborn and they would come back as Helgi Haddingjaskati and Kára.		Helgakviða Hjörvarðssonar, Helgakviða Hundingsbana I, Helgakviða Hundingsbana II, Völsunga saga, Norna-Gests þáttr	
Helgi the Sharp^{1} or Helgi the Keen	Old Norse: Helgi Hvassi		For etymology, see Helga	In Sögubrot af nokkrum fornkonungum, Helgi the Sharp^{1} was the brother of Hrœrekr Ringslinger, the king of Zealand. Hrœrekr married Auðr the Deep-Minded, the daughter of king Ivar Vidfamne, but Auðr and Helgi felt attracted to each other. King Ivar saw an advantage in this and told Hrœrekr that Auðr was unfaithful with Helgi. Hrœrekr then killed Helgi and after this Hrœrekr was himself soon killed by his father-in-law Ivar who had one opponent less and wanted to include Zealand in his dominions.		Sögubrot af nokkrum fornkonungum	
Helgi the Sharp^{2} or Helgi the Keen	Old Norse: Helgi Hvassi		For etymology, see Helga	In Ragnarssona þáttr, Helgi the Sharp^{2}, was the brother of Gudrød Olafsson, and he left the battle where Arnulf of Carinthia slaughtered 100 000 Danes and Norwegians including his brother Gudrød and Sigurd Snake-in-the-Eye (historically the Battle of Leuven in 891). He informed Sigurd's mother Aslaug^{1} of her son's death and stayed with her to defend her country, since Sigurd's son Horda-Knut was too young. He married Horda-Knut's twin sister Aslaug^{2} and they had the son Sigurd Hart.		Ragnarssona þáttr	
Helm	Old English: Helm		The name means "protector".	Appears in Widsith, line 29, as a Wulfing. Wealhtheow, Hrothgar's wife is called ides Helminga ("lady of the Helmings") in Beowulf (610), which means that she belonged to Helm's clan and was a Wulfing.	Widsith		
Helmnot Eleuther	Latin: Helmnod Eleuther		His epithet Eleuther may be a Latinized version of OHG Liutheri.	Gunther's vassal, he is killed by Walter of Aquitaine.			Waltharius
Heming^{1}	Old Norse: Hæmingr		The name is often said to be identical with ON hemingr which meant "the skin on the backside of an animal's leg" and which was used in legal ceremonies, from PGmc *χam(m)inʒaz ("skin of the hide shanks"). According to Peterson, it was more likely derived from the word hamr ("disguise"). The name was most common in Scandinavia, which suggests that it originated there.	One of the sons of Hunding in Helgakviða Hundingsbana II. When Helgi had spied in the hall of Hunding, he revealed himself on purpose to Heming by telling a shepherd that he was the man they had thought was Hamal, Hagal's son. Helgi was Hamal's foster-son, so Hunding sent a search party to Hamal led by his evil counsellor Blind. Norna-Gests þáttr tells that in the first battle against Helgi Hundingsbane, Heming's brothers Eyjolf, Hervard and Hjörvard were slain, but Lyngvi, Alf and Heming escaped to be killed later in battle against Sigurd.		Helgakviða Hundingsbana II, Norna-Gests þáttr	
Hemming^{2}	Old English: Hemming		See Heming^{1}	He is mentioned in Beowulf (1944, 1961) as a kinsman (mæg) of Offa, Eomer and Garmund (Wermund).	Beowulf		
Hengest	Old English: Hengest, Old Norse: Heingestr	Unclear if identical with Hengist, brother of Horsa. If so, probably a mythical figure.	From PGmc *hangistaz ("stallion").	The Danish ruler Hnæf was invited to his Frisian brother-in-law Finn with 60 other Danes. In the morning, they are attacked in the Frisian hall and they defend themselves for five days without losses, but eventually Hnæf is slain. Finn has so few men left that he is unable to continue the attack, so he has to agree on peace with Hnæf's successor Hengest. The remaining Danes stay in Friesland over the winter, but Hengest longs for revenge, and eventually his warriors Guthlaf and Oslaf exhort him to avenge their fallen kinsmen. Finn is attacked and killed, and Hnæf's sister Hildeburh is taken home together with the Frisian royal treasure.	Beowulf, Finnsburg Fragment	Prose Edda (prologue)	
Heoden	Old English: Heoden, Henden, Old Norse: Heðinn, Middle High German: Hetel(e) or Eten(e) (Dukus Horant), Latin: Hithinus (Gesta Danorum)	Possibly a historical figure from around the Baltic Sea, 4th century.	*Hetin or *Hetan, based on the equivalent of OE hedin, ON heðinn, both meaning "cape or hood of skin or fur". Name may indicate an animal skin or mask worm as a disguise. MHG "Hetel(e)" probably altered toward OHG hadu- ("conflict") + the suffix -ilo.	Abductor of Hildr^{1}. In Kudrun, he sends Horant to woo Hildr for him, who lets herself be abducted. After fighting in which he is wounded, Hildr intervenes and her father Hagen/Högni^{2} accepts his suit. Later, he accepts Herwig von Seeland's suit for his own daughter Kudrun, although Herwig must initially fight him. When Kudrun is abducted by the Normans, he fights against them and is killed by the Norman king Ludwig. In the Norse sources, he abducts Hildr and is forced to fight an eternal battle against her father, with Hildr resurrecting the dead each night.	Widsith	Ragnarsdrápa, Gesta Danorum, Skáldskaparmál	Kudrun, Dukus Horant
Heorogar	Old English: Heorogār		PN Herugaizaz from *heruz ("sword") and *gaizaz ("spear").	The son of the Scylding Halfdan and the brother of Hrothgar and Halga . He had died early, as told by Hrothgar. Hrothgar gives Heorogar's armour to Beowulf, instead of passing it to one of his sons.	Beowulf		
Heoroweard	Old English: Hērowēard, Old Norse: Hjörvarðr, Latin: Hiartuar		PN *Heruwarduz from *heruz ("sword") and *warduz ("guard, protector").	IN Hrólfs saga kraka, Heoroweard kills and usurps the throne from Hrólfr Kraki on the incitement of his wife Skuld, Hrothgar's daughter.	Beowulf	Chronicon Lethrense, Gesta danorum, Skjöldunga saga, Hrólfs saga kraka	
Heorrenda	Old English: Heorrenda, Middle High German: Hôrant. In Old Norse, an equivalent personal name Hjarrandi is attested.	Possibly a historical figure from around the Baltic Sea, 4th century.	Participle from a verb akin to OHG hurren ("to move quickly"), akin to OE heorr and ON hjarri, both meaning "door hinge'. The German form possibly influenced by MHG hôren ("to hear").	Scop or minstrel of Heoden. He is sent by his lord to woe Hildr, whom he abducts. In Deor, the narrator complains that Heorrenda has replaced him as Heoden's minstrel. In the Prose Edda (Skáldskaparamál), he is instead mentioned as the father of Heoden (Heðinn). He is also refererred to in a line in Bósa saga reflecting an older Norse version where he was a minstrel, and he also appears as the minstrel Hjarne in Gesta Danorum (VI).	Deor	Skáldskaparmál (Prose Edda), Bósa saga, Gesta Danorum	Kudrun, Dukus Horant
Herborg	Old Norse: Herborg	An invention of the poet; however, her story corresponds with the German epic Kudrun.	The first element is from *harjaz ("host"), and the second element is PGmc *-berʒō or *-burʒō ("helper", "assistant").	A queen of the Huns and foster-mother of Gudrun's sister Gullrönd. She tells Gudrun her sad story to try to make her grieve.		Guðrúnarkviða I	
Herbort von Dänenland	Middle High German: Herbort von Tenelant, Old Norse: Herburt		First element PGmc *harja- ("host, army"), second element PGmc *bord- ("board"), probably "shield" in names.	Possibly the hero of a lost epic; in Biterolf und Dietleib he boasts of how he abducted Hildeburg^{2}, sister of Hartmut von Normandie, and in the Þiðreks saga is shown to abduct the daughter of King Arthur, Hildr (Hildeburg^{2}). In the Eckenlied, he is mentioned as the son of the hero Ruodlieb and a previous possessor of Ecke's sword (Eckesachs).			Biterolf und Dietleib, Þiðreks saga
Herdegen	Middle High German: Herdegen, Old Norse: Herðegn		First element is PGmc *harja- ("host, army"), and the second element thegan ("hero", "warrior", "servant"), from PGmc *þeʒnaz.	One of the retainers of the Harlungen; in the Þiðreks saga, he is the brother of Herbort and is married to Dietrich von Bern's sister, Isolde of Ireland. When Herdegen dies in swordplay with his brother Tristram, Herbort is held responsible and is forced to leave.			Biterolf und Dietleib, Þiðreks saga
Herebeald	Old English: Herebeald	In spite of correspondences, there is no consensus on whether Herebeald and his brother Hæþcyn are the origin of the myth of Hǫðr and Baldr, or based on them.	The first element of Herebeald (PN *Hari-baldraʀ) is *Hari- (*harjaz, "host") and the second element is the same as in the Norse theonym Baldr.	The Geatish prince Hæþcyn accidentally kills his brother Herebeald with an arrow, and their father king Hrēðel dies from grief. Hæþcyn succeeds him, but is later killed in battle against the Swedes. The third brother Hygelac succeeds him. They also have an unnamed sister who married Ecgþēow, Beowulf's father.	Beowulf		
Heregart	Middle High German: Heregart		The first element is PGmc *harja- ("host, army"), and the second element gard-, from PGmc *ʒarđaz ("house", "family", "court", "yard").	Kudrun's most high-born maiden-in-waiting. When she is abducted by Kudrun, she marries the Norman cupbearer and thus avoids the privations of her mistress. When the Normans are defeated, she is beheaded by Wade.			Kudrun
Heremod	Old English: Heremōd		PN *Harimōdaz from *harjaz ("host") and *mōdaz ("mood", "bravery", "wrath").	Heremod was a king of the Scyldings who used to be a great warrior. However, he abdicated from his warlike duties, and was therefore banished for neglecting the safety of his people.	Beowulf		
Hereric^{1}	Old English: Hererīc		From PN *Harirīkiaz or *Harirīkaz, where the first element is *harjaz ("host") and the second element is from the adjective *rīkia- ("powerful, prominent, rich") or from *rīkaz ("ruler, prince").	Mentioned in line 2206 as the uncle of the Geatish king Heardred.	Beowulf		
Hereric^{2}	Latin: Herericus		See Hereric^{1}	The king of Burgundy and father of Hildegund, whom he sends as a hostage to Attila the Hun.			Waltharius
Hergrímr	Old Norse: Hergrímr		The first element is from *harjaz ("host"), and the second element is grímr which means "mask", but it may have been conflated with grimmr meaning "cruel".	In the U-version of Hervarar saga, Hergrímr kidnaps Ogn^{2} álfasprengi from her betrothed, the giant Starkad Ala-Warrior. Hergrímr has the son Grímr with her before Starkad finds him and challenges him to a holmgang. Starkad fights with four swords at once and kills him, and when Ogn sees Hergrímr die, she kills herself rather than return to Starkad. The latter takes all the riches Hergrímr owned and also his son and raises him as his own. Grímr is the grandfather of Arngrim, the berserker.		Hervarar saga (U)	
Heribrand	Old High German: Heribrant, Middle High German: Herebrant, Old Norse: Herbrandr and Old Norse: Reginballdr		The first element of Heribrand is PGmc *harja ("army, host"), the second element is *branda ("sword"). The name Reginballdr comes from PGmc *ragan ("council," but possibly also "divine powers" as in ON ragnar), the second element is PGmc balda ("bold, brave, strong").	Hildebrand^{1}'s father in the Hildebrandslied. In Wolfdietrich B, he is a son of Berchtung; he is imprisoned by Wolfdietrich's brothers and freed by Wolfdietrich. In Wolfdietrich D, he raises Wolfdietrich's son Hugdietrich, marries Amie, and receives Garte (Garda) as a fief. In the Þiðreks saga, Herbrandr is the son of Reginbaldr, which is also the name of Hildebrand^{1}'s father in the saga, but there is no stated relationship to Hildebrand^{1}.			Hildebrandslied, Þiðreks saga, Dietrichs Flucht, Virginal, Wolfdietrich
Heriburg	Latin: Heriburg}		See Herborg.	The daughter of Hartung, Ruodlieb marries her.			Ruodlieb
Herleif				See Hjörleif, Leif			
Herman	Old Norse: Herman		The first element is OHG hari, PGmc *harja ("army, host"), and the second element is PGmc *manna ("man").	A Swabian count in the service of Sigmund; he accuses Queen Sisibe (Sieglinde) of adultery together with Hartvin. When Sigmund orders the pregnant queen's death, he saves her life by killing Hartvin and allowing her to escape into the woods.			Þiðreks saga
Hermanafrid	Middle High German: Irnfrit	Historical king of the Thuringii, died c. 531.	First element PGmc *ermana- ("universal"), second element PGmc *friþu- ("peace").	King of the Thuringii and lord of Iring. In the Deeds of the Saxons, his vassal Iring murders him. In later epics, he is the exiled Thuringian and lives at Attila's court. He is killed by Volker in the Nibelungenlied.			'Deeds of the Saxons, Nibelungenlied, Biterolf und Dietleib
Herrat	Middle High German: Herrât, Old Norse: Herrað	According to Gillespie, the name shares the same first element with Theodoric's mother Ereleuva. (Gottfried Schramm instead derives the first element of Erelieva's name from a different element, *era-, of unclear meaning).	First element PGmc *harja- ("host, army"), second element PGmc *rādi- ("council" or "supplies").	The wife of Dietrich von Bern; her relatives vary, but she is usually related to Helche and Attila.			Nibelungenlied, Nibelungenklage, Þiðreks saga, Dietrichs Flucht, Die Rabenschlacht, Biterolf und Dietleib, Heldebuch-Prosa
Herrauðr	Old Norse: Herrauðr, Herruðr, Herrøðr, Latin: Herroth		The first element Herr- is from PGmc *harjaz ("host"). The second element -røðr is from PN *friþuʀ ("love and peace"), while the second element -uðr is from a root meaning "love". The second element rauðr means "red".	In Bósa saga, the Geatish prince Herrauðr is the knightly son of king Hringr of Östergötland, and the blood-brother of the undaunted Bósi. When king Hring wants to hang them for manslaughter, Bósi's foster-mother, the sorceress Busla makes the king give up with a runic riddle (buslubœn) that he can't solve. In repentance Herrauðr and Bósi have to retrieve a dragon's egg from Bjarmaland. Herrauðr saves the princess Hleiðr from human sacrifice and they become engaged. When they are back, the Battle of Brávellir takes place, king Hring dies and Hleiðr is kidnapped by Bjarmians. They save Hleiðr from a forced marriage during great adventures and battles, and even the sexual athlete Bósi settles down with princess Edda. The dragon's egg hatches and Herrauðr gives it to his and Hleið's daughter. The only one who can marry the daughter is the one who kills the serpent, Ragnar Lodbrok. In Ragnar's saga, Herruðr is the jarl of Gautland (Götaland) and had given his daughter Thora a heather-snake that grew so it encircled her bower. He swore he would give his daughter to the man who killed it, and this man was Ragnar Lodbrok. In the Tale of Ragnar's sons, this account is summarized but he is called Herrauðr and the jarl of Västergötland. In Gesta Danorum (IX), he is a Swedish ruler whose friends found some snakes when they were hunting together. He gave them to Thora, but through feeding they became so large that the terrorized the countryside, and so he promised to give his daughter to whoever killed them, which Ragnar did. He is later reported to have died.		Bósi and Herrauðr's saga, Tale of Ragnar's Sons, Tale of Ragnar Lodbrok, Krákumál, Gesta Danorum IX	
Hertnit	Middle High German: Hertnît, Old Norse: Hertnið		The first element Hert- is from hardu ("hard"), from PGmc *χarđuz. The second element nit is from nitha ("envy, spite"), PGmnc *nīþan or *nīþaz.	In German sources, the king of the Rus' and aids Attila and Dietrich von Bern. In the Þiðreks saga, the son of Oserich (Osantrix), king of the Veleti. He is married to the sorceress Ostacia and attacks king Isung of Britain.			Þiðreks saga, Dietrichs Flucht, Rosengarten zu Worms, Heldenbuch-Prosa
Hervard^{1}	Old Norse: Hervarðr		The first element herr is from PGmc *harjaz ("host"), and the second element vǫrðr is from PN *varðuʀ ("watchman", "guard").	One of the twelve berserker sons of Arngrim. For a summary, see those of Angantýr^{2}, Hjörvard^{1} Arngrimsson, Hjalmar, and Ingeborg. The name was also used by his niece Hervor^{2} when she had run away from home and was the leader of a group of pillaging Vikings, see Hervor^{2}.		Hervarar saga, Orvar-Odd's saga, Gesta Danorum, Hyndluljóð	
Hervard^{2}	Old Norse: Hervarðr		See Hervard^{1}	Hervard was the son of a king named Hunding who was killed by Sigmund's son Helgi, who thus earned himself the cognomen Hundingsbane. Hunding's sons attacked Helgi but were defeated and killed. The Völsunga saga lists the sons of Hunding as Alf^{2} and Eyjolf, Hervard^{2} and Hagbard^{2}, but Helgakviða Hundingsbana I and II the names Hjorvard^{3} and Havarth appear instead of Hervard^{2} and Hagbard^{2}. Helgakviða Hundingsbana II adds a brother named Heming, and the Völsunga saga adds yet another brother called king Lyngvi who killed Sigmund in battle. Norna-Gests þáttr tells that in the first battle against Helgi Hundingsbane, Eyjolf, Hervard and Hjörvard were slain, but Lyngvi, Alf and Heming escaped to be killed later in battle against Sigurd.		Völsunga saga, Norna-Gests þáttr	
Hervor^{1}	Old Norse: Hervǫr	Unknown, possibly a historical figure from modern Ukraine.	ON Hervǫr is composed of her ("host") and the feminine form of varr, from *warjaz ("defender"). These elements agree with her role, as the protector of the eastern frontier.	Daughter of Heidrek with Hergerðr (only named in the U version) the princess of Garðar (Rus'), sister of Angantyr, half-sister of Hlöd. According to the R version she was raised in England at the court of the jarl Fróðmar, but later it agrees with the HU versions in making Ormar her foster-father. She is stationed at a fortress on the Gothic eastern frontier near Mirkwood and falls in the first battle against the Hunnish invasion force. She is a shield-maiden.		Hervarar saga	
Hervor^{2}	Old Norse: Hervǫr	Based on Hervor^{1}	See Hervor^{1}	Daughter of Angantýr^{2} and Sváfa^{2}, she grows up with her grandfather Bjarmarr, the ruler of the Swedish colony in Aldeigjuborg on Lake Ladoga. She is beautiful but violent and unruly, and she spent time as a highwayman until she was taken home by her grandfather. She runs away again and calling herself Hervard, she becomes the captain of a Viking ship, which takes her to Samsø where she takes her inheritance Tyrfing from her father Angantýr. She goes to Gudmund of Glæsisvellir but has to leave after killing a courtier. After some time as a Viking again, she returns home to Bjarmarr. She marries Gudmund's son Höfund and they have the sons Heidrek and Angantýr. When Heidrek is banished from the kingdom for killing his brother, she gives him the heirloom Tyrfing.		Hervarar saga	
Hervör alvitr	Old Norse: Hervǫr alvitr		For etymology of first name, see Hervor. The second name, ON alvitr means either "omniscient" or "supernatural being, Valkyrie".	A valkyrie and swan maiden. The wife of Wayland the Smith.		Völundarkviða	
Herwig von Seeland	Middle High German: Herwîc von Sêlant		First element PGmc *harja-, OHG hari ("host, army"), second element PGmc wīga-, related to Gothic weihan ("to fight").	Suitor for marriage with Kudrun and her eventual husband. His suit for Kudrun is only accepted after he defeats her father Heoden in battle. He aids Hetel when Kudrun is abducted by the Normans Ludwig and Hartmut and Hetel is killed. Eventually, he successfully defeats the Normans.			Kudrun

== General sources ==
- Bellows, Henry Adams (1923). The Poetic Edda. New York; The American-Scandinavian Foundation.
- Byock, Jesse (1990). The Saga of the Volsungs: The Norse Epic of Sigurd the Dragon Slayer. University of California Press. ISBN 0-520-23285-2.
- Byock, Jesse (1999). The Saga of King Hrolf Kraki. Penguin Classics. ISBN 014043593X.
- Byock, Jesse (2013). Viking Language 1, Learn Old Norse, Runes and Icelandic sagas. Jules William Press. ISBN 978-1480216440.
- Stories and Ballads of the Far Past. Translated by Chadwick, Nora Kershaw. Cambridge at the University Press. 1921.
- Clarke, M. G. (1911). Sidelights on Teutonic History During the Migration Period, being Studies of Beowulf and Other Old English Poems. Cambridge University Press.
- Cleasby, Richard; Vigfússon, Gudbrand (1874). An Icelandic-English dictionary. Oxford Clarendon Press.
- Clunies Ross, Margaret (2012). "Poetry in Fornaldarsögur: Origins, Nature and Purpose". In Lassen, Annette; Ney, Agneta; Jakobsson, Ármann (eds.). The Legendary Sagas, Origins and Development. University of Iceland Press, Reykjavík. pp. 121–138. ISBN 978-9979-54-9680.
- Earl, James W. (2015). "The Swedish Wars in Beowulf". Journal of English and Germanic Philology. 114 (1): 32–60. doi:10.5406/jenglgermphil.114.1.0032. S2CID 162204472.
- Ellis, Hilda Roderick (1968). "The Road to Hel, a Study of the Conception of the Dead in Old Norse Literature". American Anthropologist. Greenwood Press Publishers, New York. doi:10.1525/AA.1944.46.3.02A00210. S2CID 160666598.
- The Saga of the Volsungs (PDF). Translated by Finch, R. G. London and Edinburgh: Nelson. 1965.
- Finlay, Alison (2010). "The Saga of Ásmundr, Killer of Champions: Introduction" (PDF). In Arnold, Martin; Finlay, Alison (eds.). Making History: Essays on the Fornaldarsögur. Viking Society for Northern Research. pp. 119–124. ISBN 978-0-903521-84-0.
- Heimskringla (PDF). Vol. 1. Translated by Finlay, Alison; Faulkes, Anthony. Viking Society for Northern Research, University College London. 2016. ISBN 978-0-903521-86-4.
- Friis-Jensen, Karsten, ed. (2015). Gesta Danorum, History of the Danes. Translated by Fisher, R. G. Oxford: Clarendon Press.
- Förstemann, Ernst (1900). Altdeutsches Namenbuch, Band 1: Personennamen (2 ed.). Bonn: Bonn, P. Hanstein.
- Gade, Kari Ellen; Marold, Edith, eds. (2017). "Anonymous Þulur, Kálfsvísa 1". Poetry from Treatises on Poetics. Skaldic Poetry of the Scandinavian Middle Ages. Vol. 3. Turnhout: Brepols. ISBN 978-2-503-51894-7.
- Gentry, Francis G.; McConnell, Winder; Müller, Ulrich; Wunderlich, Werner, eds. (2011) [2002]. The Nibelungen Tradition. An Encyclopedia. New York, Abingdon: Routledge. ISBN 978-0-8153-1785-2.
- Fulk, R.D.; Cain, Christopher M. (2013). A History of Old English Literature. Wiley-Blackwell. ISBN 978-1-118-45323-0.
- Garmonsway, G.N.; Simpson, Jacqueline; Ellis Davidson, Hilda (1968). Beowulf and its Analogues. . M. Dent & Sons ltd. SBN 460 03804 4.
- Ghosh, Shami (2007). "On the origins of Germanic heroic poetry: a case study of the legend of the Burgundians". Beiträge zur Geschichte der deutschen Sprache und Literatur. 129 (2): 220–252. doi:10.1515/BGSL.2007.220. S2CID 161148492.
- Gillespie, George T. (1973). Catalogue of Persons Named in German Heroic Literature, 700-1600: Including Named Animals and Objects and Ethnic Names. Oxford: Oxford University. ISBN 978-0-19-815718-2.
- Guðmundsdóttir, Aðalheiður (2007). "The Werewolf in Medieval Icelandic Literature". The Journal of English and Germanic Philology. 106 (3): 277–303. doi:10.2307/27712657. JSTOR 27712657. S2CID 19255743.
- The Poetic Edda. Translated by Hollander, Lee M. Texas University Press. 1928.
- De Gamle Eddadigte. Translated by Jónsson, Finnur. G. E. C. Gats forlag, København. 1932.
- Kaufmann, Hennig (1968). Ergänzungsband zu Ernst Förstemann: Personennamen. Wilhelm Fink.
- Kendrick, T.D. (1930). A History of the Vikings. Methuen & Co. Ltd., London. ISBN 014043593X.
- Stories and Ballads of the Far Past. Translated by Kershaw, N. Cambridge at the University Press. 1921.
- Kightley, Michael R. (2016). "The Brothers of Beowulf : Fraternal Tensions and the Reticent Style". ELH. 83 (2): 407–429. doi:10.1353/elh.2016.0015. S2CID 164186249.
- Klaeber, Friedrich (2008). Fulk, R.D.; Bjork, Robert E.; Niles, John D. (eds.). Klaeber's Beowulf and The Fight at Finnsburg. University of Toronto Press. pp. 274–277. ISBN 978-0-8020-9843-6.
- Krause, Arnulf (2010). Reclams Lexikon der germanischen Mythologie und Heldensage. Reclam. ISBN 978-3-15-010778-2.
- Kroesen, Riti (1987). "One Hadingus - Two Haddingjar". Scandinavian Studies. 54 (4): 404–435. JSTOR 40918880.
- Phelpstead, Carl, ed. (2001). A History of Norway and the Passion and Miracles of the Blessed Óláfr (PDF). Translated by Kunin, Devra. Viking Society for Northern Research. ISBN 978-0-903521-48-2.
- Malone, Kemp (1933). Deor. London: Methuen & Co lmt.
- Malone, Kemp (1936). Wisith (1962 ed.). Rosenkilde and Bagger, Copenhagen.
- Maenchen-Helfen, Otto J. (1973). Knight, Max (ed.). The World of the Huns: Studies in Their History and Culture. University of California Press. ISBN 978-0-520-01596-8.
- Naumann, Hans-Peter (2016). "Bósa saga ok Herrauðs". In Pulsiano, Philip; Wolf, Kirsten (eds.). Medieval Scandinavia, an Encyclopedia. New York: Routledge Revivals. p. 54. ISBN 978-1-315-16132-7.
- Naumann, Hans-Peter (2018). Metrische Runeninschriften in Skandinavien: Einführung, Edition und Kommentare. Narr Francke Attempto Verlag. ISBN 978-3-7720-8652-6.
- Nerman, Birger (1925). Svenska rikets uppkomst. Stockholm: Generalstabens litografiska anstalt.
- Newton, Sam (1993). The Origins of Beowulf and the Pre-Viking Kingdom of East Anglia. Cambridge University Press. ISBN 9780859914727.
- Niles, John D. (2007). Niles, John D.; Osbourne, Marijane (eds.). Beowulf and Lejre. Temple, Arizona: ACMRS. ISBN 978-0-86698-368-6.
- Olrik, Axel (1919). The Heroic Legends of Denmark. Translated by Hollander, Lee M. New York: The American-Scandinavian Foundation.
- Orchard, Andy (1997). Dictionary of Norse Myth and Legend. Cassel. ISBN 0-304-34520-2.
- Orel, Vladimir E. (2003). A Handbook of Germanic Etymology. Brill. ISBN 978-90-04-12875-0.
- Överland, O. A. (1909). "Halfdan Svarte". In Westrin, Th. (ed.). Nordisk Familjebok. Vol. 10 (2 ed.). p. 1082.
- Paff, William J. (1959). The Geographical and Ethnic Names in the Þíðriks Saga: A Study in Germanic Heroic Legend. Mouton & co.
- Peterson, Lena (2004). Lexikon över urnordiska personnamn. Uppsala: Institutet för språk och folkminnen.
- Peterson, Lena (2007). Nordiskt runnamnslexikon. Uppsala: Institutet för språk och folkminnen.
- Pritsak, Omeljan (1981). The origin of Rus'. Harvard University Press. pp. 188–225.
- Rosenberg, C. (1909). "Harald Hildetand". In Westrin, Th. (ed.). Nordisk Familjebok. Vol. 10 (2 ed.). p. 1443.
- Schneider, Hermann (1933). Nordgermanische Heldensage. Vol. II, I. Walter de Gruyter & CO, Berlin and Leipzig.
- Schneider, Hermann (1962). Germanische Heldensage, Bd. 1: Deutsche Heldensage (2 ed.). de Gruyter.
- Schramm, Gottfried (2013). Zweigliedrige Personennamen im Germanischen: Ein Bildetyp als gebrochener Widerschein früher Heldenlieder. de Gruyter. doi:10.1515/9783110324747. ISBN 978-3-11-032444-0.
- Sebo, Erin (2018). "Foreshadowing the End in Beowulf". English Studies. 99 (8): 836–847. doi:10.1080/0013838X.2018.1516016. S2CID 165213602.
- Seelow, Hubert (2016). "Hálfs Saga Ok Hálfsrekka". In Pulsiano, Philip; Wolf, Kirsten (eds.). Medieval Scandinavia, an Encyclopedia. New York: Routledge Revivals. p. 262. ISBN 978-1-315-16132-7.
- Shaull, Erin M. (2016). "Ecgþeow, Brother of Ongenþeow, and the Problem of Beowulf's Swedishness". Neophilologus. 101 (2): 263–275. doi:10.1007/s11061-016-9508-2. S2CID 164608334.
- Simek, Rudolf (1993). Dictionary of Northern Mythology. Translated by Hall; Angela. D. S. Brewer. ISBN 0-85991-369-4.
- The Saga of King Heidrek the Wise (PDF). Translated by Tolkien, Christopher. 1960.
- de Vries, Jan (1962). Altnordisches Etymologisches Worterbuch (2000 ed.). Brill. ISBN 90-04-05436-7.
- Uecker, Heiko (1972). Germanische Heldensage. Stuttgart: Metzler. ISBN 3476101061.
- The Sagas of Ragnar Lodbrok. Translated by Waggoner, Ben. Troth Publications, New Haven, Connecticut. 2009. ISBN 978-0-578-02138-6.
- Wessén, Elias (1927). "Eddadikterna om Helge Hundingsbane". Fornvännen.
- Wessén, Elias (1952). Wessén, Elias; Helgason, Jón; Knudsen, Trygve; Skautrup, Peter (eds.). Ynglingsaga. Svenska bokförlaget Norstedts, Stockholm; Ejnar Munksgaard, København; Dreyers forlag, Oslo.
- Westrin, Th. (1909a). "Hake". In Westrin, Th. (ed.). Nordisk Familjebok. Vol. 10 (2 ed.). pp. 1063f.
- Westrin, Th. (1909b). "Half". In Westrin, Th. (ed.). Nordisk Familjebok. Vol. 10 (2 ed.). pp. 1077f.
