= Senator Pound =

Senator Pound may refer to:

- Cuthbert W. Pound (1864–1935), New York State Senate
- Stephen Bosworth Pound (1833–1911), Nebraska State Senate
- Thaddeus C. Pound (1832–1914), Wisconsin State Senate

== See also ==
- Senator Pond (disambiguation)
