= Roscoe Pound =

American legal scholar and educator (1870–1964)

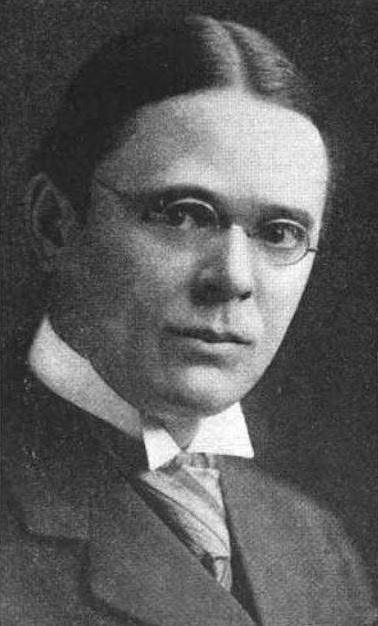
- Pound c. 1916

4th Dean of Harvard Law School
- In office 1916–1936
- Preceded by: Ezra Ripley Thayer
- Succeeded by: James M. Landis

Dean of the University of Nebraska College of Law
- In office 1903–1911

Personal details
- Born: Nathan Roscoe Pound; October 27, 1870 Lincoln, Nebraska, U.S.
- Died: July 1, 1964 (aged 93) Cambridge, Massachusetts, U.S.
- Education: University of Nebraska–Lincoln (BS, MS, PhD); Harvard University
- Occupation: Law professor; author; academic

Academic work
- Institutions: Northwestern University; University of Chicago; Harvard University; University of California, Los Angeles

Nathan Roscoe Pound (October 27, 1870 – July 1, 1964) was an American legal scholar and educator. He served as dean of the University of Nebraska College of Law from 1903 to 1911 and was dean of Harvard Law School from 1916 to 1936. He was a member of Northwestern University, the University of Chicago Law School and the faculty at UCLA School of Law in the school's early years, from 1949 to 1952. The Journal of Legal Studies has identified Pound as one of the most cited legal scholars of the 20th century.

== Early life and education ==
Pound was born on October 27, 1870, in Lincoln, Nebraska, to Stephen Bosworth Pound and Laura Pound. His sister was the noted linguist and folklorist Louise Pound. Pound studied botany at the University of Nebraska in Lincoln, where he became a member of the Acacia Fraternity. He received his bachelor's degree in 1888 and his master's degree in 1889. In 1889 he began the study of law; he spent one year at Harvard but never received a law degree. Following his year at Harvard, he returned to Nebraska where he passed the bar without a law degree. He received the first PhD in botany from the University of Nebraska in 1898. From 1899 to 1907, he taught law on the faculty of the University of Nebraska College of Law.

== Career ==
In 1903, Pound became dean of the University of Nebraska College of Law. He was elected to the American Academy of Arts and Sciences in 1911. That same year, he began teaching at Harvard and in 1916 became dean of Harvard Law School and served in that role until 1937. He wrote "Spurious Interpretation" in 1907, Outlines of Lectures on Jurisprudence in 1914, The Spirit of the Common Law in 1921, Law and Morals in 1924, and Criminal Justice in America in 1930.

In 1908, he was part of the founding editorial staff of the first comparative law journal in the United States, the Annual Bulletin of the Comparative Law Bureau of the American Bar Association. In 1909, he taught at the University of Chicago Law School. Although it is not often remembered now, Pound was a Roman law scholar. He taught that subject at Nebraska, Northwestern, and Harvard. Pound was sufficiently adept at Latin to translate Roman law into English for a sourcebook he used for those classes, and he was said by Professor Joseph Henry Beale to have "brought the spirit of Roman law to Harvard". Pound was also the founder of the movement for "sociological jurisprudence", an influential critic of the U.S. Supreme Court's "liberty of contract" (freedom of contract) line of cases, symbolized by Lochner v. New York (1905), and one of the early leaders of the movement for American Legal Realism, which argued for a more pragmatic and public-interested interpretation of law and a focus on how the legal process actually occurred, as opposed to (in his view) the arid legal formalism which prevailed in American jurisprudence at the time. According to Pound, these jurisprudential movements advocated "the adjustment of principles and doctrines to the human conditions they are to govern rather than to assumed first principles". While Pound was dean, law school registration almost doubled, but his standards were so rigorous that one-third of those matriculated did not receive degrees. Among these were many of the great political innovators of the New Deal years.

In 1929, President Herbert Hoover appointed Pound as one of the eleven primary members of the Wickersham Commission on issues relating to law enforcement, criminal activity, police brutality, and Prohibition.

During Roosevelt's first term, Pound initially supported the New Deal. In 1937, however, Pound turned against the New Deal and the Legal Realism movement altogether after Roosevelt proposed packing the federal courts and bringing independent agencies into the executive branch. Other factors contributing to this "lurking conservatism" within Pound included bitter battles with liberals on the Harvard law faculty, the death of his wife, and a sharp exchange with Karl Llewellyn. Pound, however, had for years been an outspoken advocate of these court and administrative reforms that Roosevelt proposed, and it was acknowledged that he only became conservative because he saw an opportunity to gain attention after his Harvard colleagues had turned on his ideas of government reform after Roosevelt had proposed them.

In 1937, Pound resigned as Dean of Harvard Law School to become a University Professor and soon became a leading critic of the legal realists. He proposed his ideas of government reform to Chinese leader Chiang Kai-shek. In 1934, Pound received an honorary degree from the University of Berlin, presented by the German ambassador to the United States. Pound was among the famous American jurists to express a liking for Adolf Hitler.

In the 1940s, Pound was favourably disposed to replacing John P. Higgins as a judge on the International Military Tribunal for the Far East, which was conducting a war crimes trial in Tokyo, though an appointment did not eventuate. He was elected to the American Philosophical Society in 1940. He joined the faculty of UCLA School of Law in 1949, the year the law school opened, and remained on the faculty until 1952.

=== Criminal justice in Cleveland ===
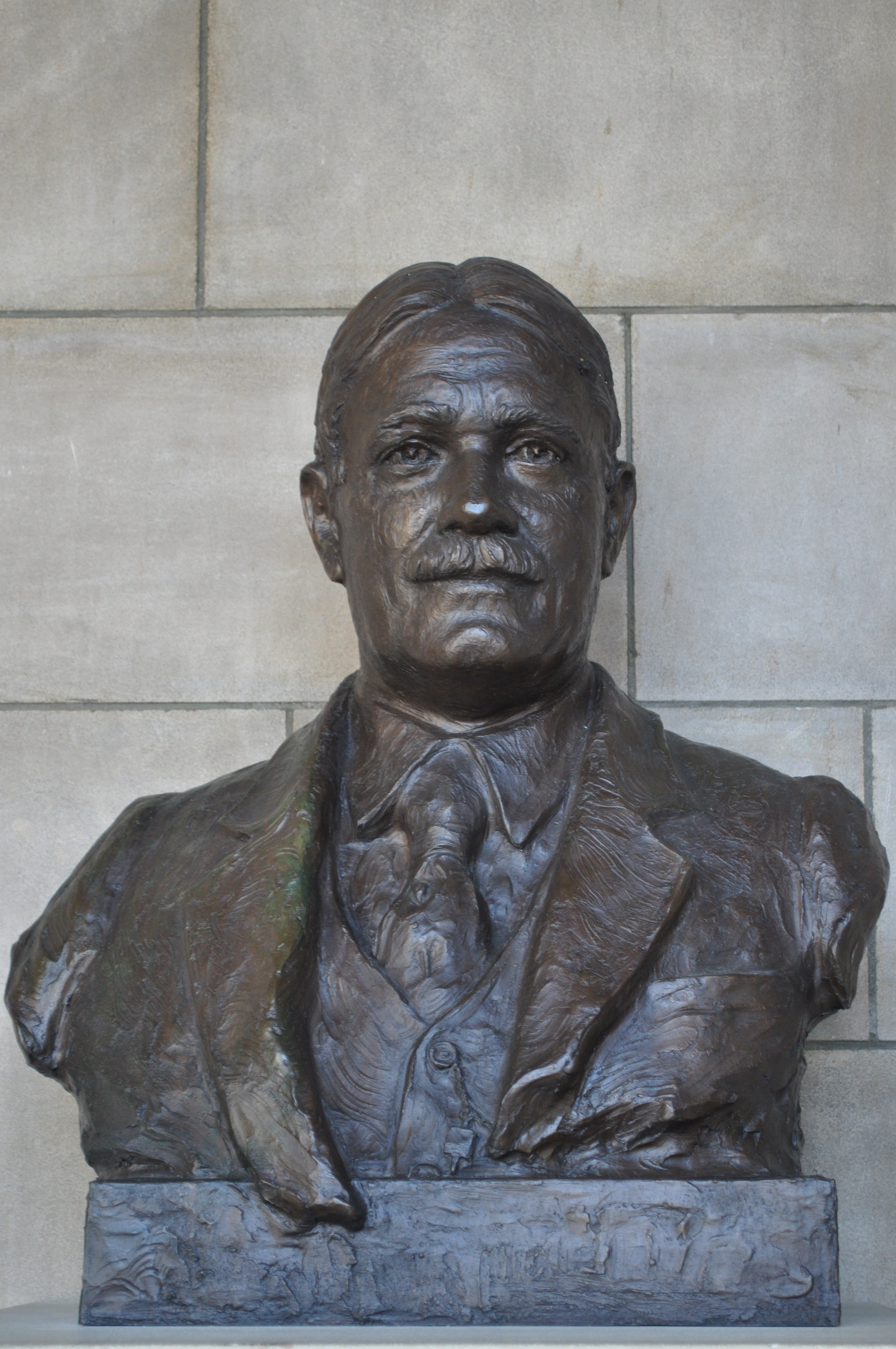
Bust of Pound created by Avard Fairbanks in 1981 for the Nebraska Hall of Fame

In 1922, Roscoe Pound and Felix Frankfurter undertook a detailed quantitative study of crime reporting in Cleveland newspapers for January 1919, using column inch counts. They found that in the first half of the month, the total space given to crime was 925in., but in the second half, it increased to 6642in. This was despite the number of crimes reported only increasing from 345 to 363. They concluded that although the city's much publicized "crime wave" was largely fictitious and manufactured by the press, the coverage had a very real consequence for the administration of criminal justice.

Because the public believed they were in the middle of a crime epidemic, they demanded an immediate response from the police and the city authorities. The agencies, wishing to retain public support, complied, caring "more to satisfy popular demand than to be observant of the tried process of law". The result was a greatly increased likelihood of miscarriages of justice and sentences more severe than the offenses warranted.

=== Contribution to jurisprudence ===
Roscoe Pound also made a significant contribution to jurisprudence in the tradition of sociological jurisprudence, which emphasized the importance of social relationships in the development of law and vice versa. His best-known theory consists of conceptualizing law as social engineering. According to Pound, a lawmaker acts as a social engineer by attempting to solve problems in society using law as a tool. Pound argued that laws must be understood by examining the "interests" that they serve. These "interests" might be individual interests, such as the protection of an individual's life or property, or broader social interests.

== Personal life ==
In 1903, Pound co-founded the Society of Innocents, the preeminent senior honor society at Nebraska. He was a Freemason and was a member and Past Master of Lancaster Lodge No. 54 AF & AM in Lincoln, Nebraska. He also served as Deputy Grand Master for the Grand Lodge of Massachusetts in 1915 and delivered a series of Masonic lectures for the Grand Lodge in March and April 1916. He helped found The Harvard Lodge A.F. & A.M. along with Divinity School professor Kirsopp Lake and others.

In 1946, Pound helped the 22-year-old Charlie Munger, later a successful businessman and investor, to get into Harvard Law School.

== Death and posthumous honors ==
Pound died at the Stillman Infirmary at Harvard, in Cambridge, Massachusetts, on July 1, 1964 at age 93. He was inducted into the Nebraska Hall of Fame in 1976.

== Selected works ==
=== Books ===
- Pound, Roscoe (1921). The Spirit of the Common Law. Boston: Marshall Jones Co.
- — (1922). An Introduction to the Philosophy of Law. New Haven: Yale University Press.
- — (1923). Interpretations of Legal History. Gloucester, MA: Peter Smith.
- — (1938). The Formative Era of American Law. Boston: Little, Brown & Co.
- — (1942). Social Control Through Law. New Haven: Yale University Press.

=== Articles ===
- Pound, Roscoe (1906). "The Causes of Popular Dissatisfaction with the Administration of Justice". The American Lawyer. 14 (10): 445–51.
- — (1908). "Common Law and Legislation". Harvard Law Review. 21 (6): 454–87. JSTOR 1325404.
- — (1908). "Mechanical Jurisprudence". Columbia Law Review. 8 (8): 605–23. JSTOR 1108954.
- — (1909). "Liberty of Contract". Yale Law Journal. 18 (7): 454–87.
- — (1910). "Law in Books and Law in Action". American Law Review. 44 (1): 12–36.
- — (1911). "The Scope and Purpose of Sociological Jurisprudence". Harvard Law Review. 24 (8): 591–619. JSTOR 1324094.
- — (1914). "The End of Law As Developed in Legal Rules and Doctrines". Harvard Law Review. 27 (3): 195–234. JSTOR 1325958.
- — (1915). "Interests of Personality". Harvard Law Review. 28 (4): 343–65. JSTOR 1326270.
- — (1916). "Equitable Relief Against Defamation and Injuries to Personality". Harvard Law Review. 29 (6): 640–82. JSTOR 1326499.
- — (1931). "The Call for a Realist Jurisprudence". Harvard Law Review. 44 (5): 697–711. JSTOR 1331791.
- — (1943). "A Survey of Social Interests". Harvard Law Review. 57 (1): 1–39. JSTOR 1334970.

== Notes ==
Academic offices
Preceded by Ezra Ripley Thayer	Dean of Harvard Law School; 1916–1936	Succeeded by James M. Landis
