= Arthur Garfield Kennedy =

American philologist

Arthur Garfield Kennedy (June 29, 1880 − April 21, 1954) was an American philologist who served as Professor of English at Stanford University from 1914 to 1945.

== Biography ==
Kennedy was born in Weeping Water, Nebraska on June 29, 1880, and attended Doane College at Crete, Nebraska. He received his master's degree from the University of Nebraska and his doctor's degree from Stanford University. From 1914 to 1945 Kennedy was Professor of English at Stanford University. He was the author of several books on the English language. In 1925 he, with Kemp Malone and Louise Pound, founded the journal American Speech and he was a frequent contributor. Kennedy died at his home in Palo Alto on April 21, 1954, and was survived by two grown children.
