= American Speech =

Quarterly academic journal

- Discipline: Linguistics
- Language: English
- Edited by: Thomas C Purnell

Publication details
- History: 1925–present
- Publisher: Duke University Press on behalf of the American Dialect Society
- Frequency: Quarterly
- Impact factor: 0.800 (2009)

Standard abbreviations
- ISO 4: Am. Speech

Indexing
- ISSN: 0003-1283 (print); 1527-2133 (web)
- LCCN: 27021844
- OCLC no.: 644323257

Links
- Journal homepage

American Speech is a quarterly academic journal of the American Dialect Society, established in 1925 and currently published by Duke University Press. It focuses primarily on the English language used in the Western Hemisphere, but also publishes contributions on other varieties of English, outside influences on the language, and linguistic theory.

The current editor is Thomas Purnell (University of Wisconsin–Madison).

The Chronicle of Higher Education's Lingua Franca considers it a "consistently reliable peer-reviewed source of information" and states that "though it is scholarly and research based, there’s a surprising amount of information that is intelligible to anyone, even without special training in linguistics."

== History ==
The journal was established in 1925 by Kemp Malone, Louise Pound, and Arthur G. Kennedy "to present information about English in America in a form appealing to general readers", and was inspired by H. L. Mencken.

According to Mencken:

The record informs me that I was the pa of American Speech—a fact that somewhat surprises me, for I have a poor memory and I am not normally given to good works.

It became the official journal of the American Dialect Society in 1970.

== Among the New Words ==
In addition to research articles, American Speech publishes a section titled "Among the New Words", which reports on recent neologisms and provides lexicographical documentation of their uses and origins. The section was introduced to the journal in 1941 by Dwight Bolinger. The section frequently discusses the words nominated for the American Dialect Society's Word of the Year selection.

== Abstracting and indexing ==
This journal is indexed by the following services:

- Arts and Humanities Citation Index
- Current Contents/Arts and Humanities
- Current Contents/Social and Behavioral Sciences
- Social Sciences Citation Index
- Scopus
- Academic Search
- H. W. Wilson Company databases
