= Senator Pond =

Senator Pond may refer to:

- Francis Bates Pond (1825–1883), Ohio State Senate
- Levi E. Pond (1833–1895), Wisconsin State Senate
- Preston Pond Jr. (1823–1864), Louisiana State Senate

== See also ==
- Senator Pound (disambiguation)
