= Louise Pound =

American folklorist and academic (1872–1958)

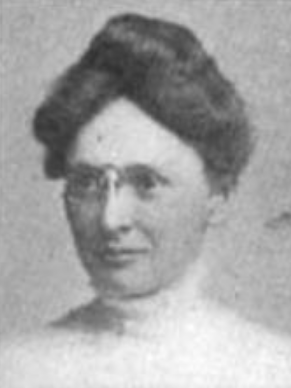
- Born: June 30, 1872; Lincoln, Nebraska, U.S.
- Died: June 28, 1958 (aged 85); Lincoln, Nebraska, U.S.
- Resting place: Wyuka Cemetery
- Education: University of Nebraska; University of Chicago; University of Heidelberg
- Parents: Stephen Bosworth Pound (father); Laura Pound (mother)
- Relatives: Roscoe Pound (brother)

Louise Pound (June 30, 1872 – June 28, 1958) was an American folklorist, linguist, and college professor at the University of Nebraska. In 1955, Pound was the first woman elected president of the Modern Language Association, and in the same year, she was the first woman inducted into the Nebraska Sports Hall of Fame.

== Early life and education ==
Pound was born in Lincoln, Nebraska, to Stephen Bosworth Pound and Laura Pound. Alongside her older brother, noted legal professor Roscoe Pound, and her younger sister, Olivia Pound, Pound was instructed by her mother in various disciplines including the natural sciences, ancient and modern languages, and literature.

Pound studied at a preparatory school, the Latin School, in the School of Fine Arts, transitioning in 1888 to the University of Nebraska (B.B. 1892 and M.A., 1895). Pound was an active student throughout the university. She was the first woman who earned a varsity letter in any sport from that university, which she earned in men’s tennis. Also, along with her siblings and her colleague Willa Cather, she was a member of the University Union Literary Society at the University of Nebraska. An orator for senior Class Day Exercises, Pound presented a speech entitled "The Apotheosis of the Common," an oration arguing the threat of prose to poetry, of the average to the individual. During her pursuit of a master's degree at the University of Nebraska, Pound began to teach at least one course in Anglo-Saxon in the English Department. In November 1892, Pound, Olivia, and Cather starred in two plays as part of the Union Branch of the University Drama club: one, a farce called The Fatal Pin; the other, Shakespeare Up to Date, a creative endeavor involving a plot of vengeance by Juliet (Pound), Ophelia (Olivia), and Macbeth (Cather). A later production, A Perjured Padulion, was speculated to have been written by Louise Pound, as described by the Nebraskan and the Hesperian. In January 1895, just before receiving her master's degree, Pound published a short story in the Nebraska State Journal, "By Homeopathic Treatment," describing an attempt at intervention for a socially conscious young woman, Matilda, by her friends, who attempt to introduce Matilda to Clementine, who believes woman's purpose is the selfless amelioration of society's evils. "By Homeopathic Treatment" was followed by "Miss Adelaide and Miss Amy" and "The Passenger from Metropolis," neither of which were published.

Pound continued her studies at the University of Chicago and the University of Heidelberg, earning her PhD in philological studies in 1900. By then, she had authored "The Romaunt of the Rose: Additional Evidence that it is Chaucer's" (1896)—an essay on Chaucer's role in the English translation of Le roman de la rose—had read her paper "English Pronunciation in Shakespeare's Time" at a gathering of graduate students, and presented her paper "The Relation of the Finnsburg Fragment to the Finn Episode in Beowulf" at the fourth session of the Central Division of the Modern Language Association. During her philological studies at the University of Chicago she also published "A List of Strong Verbs and Preterite Present Verbs in Anglo-Saxon" through the University of Chicago Press, an educational pamphlet meant to be used in her courses at the University of Nebraska. Pound completed her PhD at Heidelberg within a year, graduating magna cum laude. Her dissertation, The Comparison of Adjectives in English in the XV and XVI Century, was supervised by Heidelberg's Professor Johannes Hoops.

Shortly after attaining her PhD, Dr. Pound became an adjunct professor of English at the University of Nebraska—where she would stay for most of her career, becoming a full professor by 1912—under department chair Dr. Lucius Sherman, who had served as both her teacher and supervisor for her Master's. Here her work would focus on American folklore and dialect studies.

=== Relationships ===
Louise Pound had an intimate relationship with Ani Königsberger, daughter of the mathematician and historian of science Leo Königsberger, in which letters were regularly exchanged for over half a century; Krohn notes that "since the letters that Louise wrote to Ani aren't available, the essence of their friendship remains a mystery", but observes that their correspondence was characteristic of intimate relationships between women of the time, which were "of great emotional strength and complexity... intimacy, love, and erotic passion", even if the exact nature of their friendship, "ardent on Ani's part, almost an infatuation", meant that "that passion was not always fulfilled". Nevertheless, Ani was Pound's "closest companion" and "most intimate and enduring friend". They began their relationship as classmates who both loved the game of tennis leading to their intense and emotional companionship. Both Pound and Königsberger shared similar interests such as athletics and the outdoors. The two would spend time together; Königsberger bringing Pound on hikes and climbs while Pound teaching Königsberger "the net game" in tennis.

Pound, focusing on her professional life in teaching and scholarship, did not continue her intimate relationship with Königsberger, who later married a physician, Max Phister, who practised at Hong Kong before the Second World War and later at Beidaihe on the coast in North China. Both German, the couple were strongly anti-Nazi.

== Work ==
Louise Pound was one of the pioneers of the linguistic study of American English. The majority of her research and publications occurred pre-World War II, a time when many linguistic scholars were primarily interested in investigating British and colonial English. Pound, however, sought to examine language trends in contemporary American English, most notably in word coinage and semantics, the historical origins of American pronunciations, and mutual influences of American literature, folklore, culture, and language.

Much of Pound's scholarship involved identifying trends in American language and speech. Pound created a corpus of American euphemisms for associations with death, exploring American discomfort with the reality of morbidity. In addition, through investigating the etymology of trade names and word coinage, Pound ascertained that American commercial terminology had become mercurial and boundless. Such a shift in brand names was, to Pound, a clear break with the past conservatism and monotony of commercial language and demonstrated that Americans were claiming their own place with the inventiveness of language. Pound also delineated multiple instances where American English deviated from standard norms in the pluralization of Latin and Greek loan words. Examples of such divergences are the use of Latin plural words as American singular words such as curricula, data, alumni, and syllabi; the creation of double plurals such as insignias and stimulis; and the creation of -s plurals from Latin singulars such as antennas, vertebras, and emporiums. Pound focused much of her linguistic research upon the etymology of American slang words (e.g., "darn") as well as tracing the historical evolution of the idiosyncrasies of American pronunciation, as in the secondary nasal /n/ in Midwestern and New England English.

In addition to linguistic research of American English, Pound was also a scholar of early American literature, most notably Walt Whitman. It is no surprise that Pound, who defied American linguistic norms by studying contemporary American English, would write prolifically about Whitman's unorthodox language use. In writing about Whitman's influences upon his work, Pound identifies specific non-British influences and nuances to Whitman's writing such as Italian opera music; a predilection for French words and expressions involving nouns, slang, social words, and military terms; and unconventional renderings of classic bird poetry which use birds as symbols of fear, loss, and fatality as opposed to the conventional joyful and aesthetic birds metaphorically portrayed.

A lifelong resident of Nebraska, Pound used the rich folklore and dialect of her region to guide much of her research. True to the characteristic form of her research, Pound seeks to chronicle the features which distinguish American from traditional British folklore, as well as qualify the traits which set Nebraska folklore apart from other regions of America. Through interviews with a diverse demographic of Nebraska residents, Pound created a corpus of Nebraska lore of snakes, caves, and weeping water. Each body of lore that Pound collected is examined through historical, cultural, and linguistic lenses.

H.L. Mencken described Louise Pound as "putting the study of American English on its legs." The two spent thirty years corresponding about their interests in producing research highlighting differences between American and British English, a concept which was not popular at the time. One of Pound's most notable studies was her historical anthology on ballads which challenged scholastic assumptions about ballads as being primitive. Pound outlined the historical poetic nature of ballads and claiming them to be communal representations of contemporary culture which continue to evolve into perpetuity in American southwest and indigenous cultures. Throughout her life, Pound composed many anthologies on the poetic and historical influences upon American ballads.

== Professional memberships and honors ==
Pound was a member of many professional societies. In 1905 Pound was a champion of the Order of the Black Masque, senior women's honor society, which became a chapter of Mortar Board National College Senior Honor Society in 1920. Pound became a member of Mortar Board in that year.

She was president of the American Folklore Society (1928).

She was the first woman to serve as president of the Modern Language Association (1954–55), having previously served as its vice president (1916) and on the executive council (1925–26).

She was director (1915–19) and treasurer (1917) of the National Council of Teachers of English.

She was a Foundation Member of the Linguistic Society of America (LSA) in 1925. She also was the first woman to have an article published in the society's journal, Language (Pound 1927), and she was the first woman elected vice president of the LSA, in 1939.

Pound played an active role in the American Dialect Society for more than thirty years, including as member of the executive committee from 1928 to 1945, member of the Committee on the Dialect Dictionary from 1946 on, and as the first woman president of the society from 1938 to 1941. In 1925, with Kemp Malone and Arthur Garfield Kennedy, she founded the journal American Speech under the aegis of the American Dialect Society "to present information about English in America in a form appealing to general readers"..

Pound was the Nebraska director (1906–1908) and later national vice president of the American Association of University Women from the 1930s to 1944.The Pound residence hall (named after her) at the University of Nebraska was demolished in 2017. After this, the building at that university that was formerly the College of Business Administration was named Louise Pound Hall after her.

In 2026, a statue of Pound on a bicycle was unveiled outside Louise Pound Hall at the University of Nebraska, which made her the first woman to have a bronze statue of herself on that university’s campus.

A posthumous scholarship was developed from the estates of Roscoe and Olivia Pound in Louise Pound's name. The fellowship, handled by the AAUW, awards yearly stipends to international women students.

== Personal life ==
Pound continued a correspondence with Ani Königsberger, her "most intimate and enduring friend", for fifty eight years.

Pound and Cather residence halls at the University of Nebraska (demolished in 2017) were named after Louise Pound and Willa Cather, with whom Pound maintained a close friendship. Some scholars argue that Louise Pound and Willa Cather's friendship was romantic. Willa Cather biographers Phyllis C. Robinson and Sharon O'Brien argue that Pound was Cather's object of desire, O'Brien citing in her Willa Cather: The Emerging Voice (1987) Cather's 1892 and 1893 letters to Pound. The 1892 letter expresses Cather's impression of Pound, Cather's feelings of strangeness around her, an anxiety of the "customary goodbye formality," and a noted disagreement with the perceived unnaturalness in "feminine friendships." James Woodress, author of Willa Cather: A Literary Life (1987), argues that no evidence exists that Pound responded to Cather's affection. Similarly, Marie Krohn, in Louise Pound: The 19th Century Iconoclast who Forever Changed America's views about Women, Academics and Sports (2008), notes that "Cather biographers always mention the Cather/ Pound relationship as an important chapter of Cather's life. Whether or not the friendship occupied an equally noteworthy place in Louise Pound's life is questionable", and observed that "as a woman who enjoyed freedom of movement and independence of thought, Louise would have felt emotionally suffocated by Cather's advances", which was a factor in the ending of their friendship by 1894.

Pound also maintained a distinct rivalry with Mabel Lee, a faculty member of the University of Nebraska physical education department. Pound and Lee were initially cordial, yet differing perspectives on the role of athletics—Pound supported athletics as a field of competition, competition about which Lee maintained reservations—embittered their relationship.

== Athlete ==
Pound entered and won the Lincoln City Tennis Championship in 1890 and continued her tennis career competing against men for the University of Nebraska title in 1891 and 1892; winning both years. At 18 years old, Louise competed and won the Women's Western Tennis Championship in 1897. Pound was not only the first and only female in school history to earn a men's varsity letter, she was also rated the top player in the country while working on her doctorate at Heidelberg University. Very few times did Pound's tennis skills fall short. However, at the Ladies' Western Tennis Championship held in Chicago, Illinois, she was defeated playing a three-time U.S. Open singles champion, Juliette Atkinson. Louise not only played tennis but also showed interest in golf, winning the state golf championship in 1916.

Pound was an all-around athlete showing interest in figure skating, earning a 100-mile cycling medal in 1906, introducing skiing to Lincoln as well as being captain of her school's basketball team. She played center in their first women's basketball game in 1898 and continued to be involved with basketball by managing the university women's basketball team. Pound is also the first woman in history to be inducted into the University of Nebraska Sports Hall of Fame, in 1955.

Pound continued her tennis journey by playing doubles with Carrie Neely, at the age of 43, and winning the 1915 Central Western and Western doubles championships. In 1926, at 54 years old, Pound won the Lincoln city championship, being the first women's state golf champion.

== Death ==
Louise Pound died at a hospital in Lincoln on June 28, 1958, after suffering from coronary thrombosis. She was buried at Wyuka Cemetery.

== Bibliography ==
=== Books ===
- A List of Strong Verbs and Preterite Present Verbs in Anglo-Saxon (1898)
- The Comparison of Adjectives in English in the XV and the XVI Century (1901)
- The Periods of English literature. Outlines of the History of English Literature with Reading and Reference Lists (1910)
- Blends, Their Relation to English Word Formation (1914)
- Folk-song of Nebraska and The Central West : A Syllabus (1915)
- Poetic Origins and the Ballad (1921)
- American Ballads and Songs (1923)
- Ideas and Models (1935)
- Nebraska Cave Lore (1948)
- Selected Writings of Louise Pound (1949)
- The American Dialect Society: A Historical Sketch (1952)
- Nebraska Folklore (1959)

=== Articles ===
- "The Southwestern Cowboy Songs and the English and Scottish Popular Ballads" (1913)
- "Traditional Ballads in Nebraska" (1913)
- "British and American Pronunciation: Retrospect and Prospect" (1915)
- "New-world Analogues of the English and Scottish Popular Ballads" (1916)
- "Word-coinage and Modern Trade-names" (1917)
- "The Pluralization of Latin Loan-Words in Present-Day American Speech" (1919)
- "King Cnut's Song and Ballad Origins" (1919)
- "The 'Uniformity' of the Ballad Style" (1920)
- "The English Ballads and the Church" (1920)
- "Walt Whitman and the classics" (1925)
- "Walt Whitman Neologisms" (1925)
- "The etymology of an English expletive" (Language 3 [1927]: 96–99)
- "A Recent Theory of Ballad-Making" (1929)
- "The Etymology of Stir 'prison' Again" (1931)
- "American Euphemisms for Dying, Death, and Burial: An Anthology" (1936)
- "Literary Anthologies and the Ballad" (1942)
- "The Legend of the Lincoln Salt Basin" (1951)
- "Yet another Joe Bowers" (1957)

== See also ==
- Antonine Barada
- Ray B. Browne
