= Stephen Bosworth Pound =

American pioneer and politician (1833–1911)

Stephen Bosworth Pound (January 14, 1833 – May 14, 1911) was an American pioneer, lawyer, senator and judge in Nebraska.

== Early life and education ==
Pound was born at Farmington, New York, son of farmer Nathan King Pound and Hannah (née Lane). The Pound family descended from John Pound, a Quaker native of Yorkshire, who settled before 1672 at Piscataway, New Jersey.

Pound was not inclined to follow in the family's farming endeavours, and his father, accommodating his son's interest in learning, sent him to an academy at Macedon, New York, then the private liberal arts Union College at Schenectady, from which he graduated as valedictorian.

== Career ==
Having been admitted to the New York Bar in 1863, Pound developed a successful career as an attorney, forming a law partnership with Judge Lyman Sherwood. After Sherwood's death, Pound went to Platteville, Wisconsin, and on advice from friends subsequently decided to go to Nebraska. Pound moved to Lincoln, Nebraska in 1869. He was elected a district court judge and served in the Nebraska State Senate.

== Personal life ==
In 1869, Pound married Laura, daughter of farmer Joab Stafford Biddlecombe, whose mother, Sarah (née Read) was a descendant of the Quaker martyrs Lawrence and Cassandra Southwick. Laura Pound was a director of the Lincoln public library, and a prominent member of literary and arts associations and of the Daughters of the American Revolution in Nebraska, being elected state regent several times. They had three children, Roscoe Pound, Louise Pound, and Olivia Pound, a highschool Latin teacher.

"Deliberate, reserved, and self-contained", Roscoe Pound considered his father "one of the most scrupulously truthful men".

== Additional sources ==
- "Pound, Stephen Bosworth." The National Cyclopaedia of American Biography. 29:310-311. 1941.
