= Hans-Peter Naumann =

German philologist (1939–2020)

- Born: 18 January 1939; Chemnitz, Germany
- Died: 12 May 2020 (aged 81)

Academic background
- Education: University of Freiburg

Academic work
- Discipline: Germanic philology
- Sub-discipline: Nordic philology
- Institutions: University of Halle; University of Zurich
- Main interests: Germanic Antiquity; Old Norse literature; Runology

Hans-Peter Naumann (18 January 1939 – 12 May 2020) was a German philologist who specialized in Germanic studies.

== Biography ==
Hans-Peter Naumann was born in Chemnitz, Germany on 18 January 1939. Since 1958, Naumann studied German philology, Nordic philology and history at the University of Freiburg. Since 1965 he was a research assistant at the German Seminar at Saarland University. Naumann received his Ph.D. at Freiburg in 1968 with a dissertation on translations of the works of Johann Wolfgang von Goethe in Swedish.

Upon gaining his Ph.D., Naumann was appointed to the Nordic Department of the German Seminar at the University of Zurich. During this time he also lectured at the German Seminar at the University of Basel. Naumann completed his habilitation at Zurich in 1976 with a thesis on Old Norse literature. He subsequently served as a lecturer at the Institute for Nordic Philology and Germanic Antiquity at LMU Munich.

Naumann returned to the University of Zurich in 1979, where he subsequently served as Associate Professor (1979-1988) and Professor of Nordic Philology (1988-2004). He retired from Zurich in 2004, and died on 12 May 2020.

Naumann specialized in the study of Old Norse literature, runology and Germanic Antiquity. He was the author of numerous articles for the second edition of the Reallexikon der Germanischen Altertumskunde.

== See also ==
- Heinrich Beck
- Wilhelm Heizmann

== Selected works ==
- Goethes „Faust“ in schwedischer Uebersetzung. Stockholm/Göteborg/Uppsala 1970. (Göteborger germanistische Forschungen 10).
- Sprachstil und Textkonstitution. Untersuchungen zur altwestnordischen Rechtssprache. Helbing & Lichtenhahn, Basel 1979. (Beiträge zur nordischen Philologie 7).

== Sources ==
- Kürschners Deutscher Gelehrten-Kalender 2013. Bio-bibliographisches Verzeichnis deutschsprachiger Wissenschaftler der Gegenwart. 2. Teilband, De Gruyter, Berlin/Boston (25. Ausgabe) 2013, ISBN 978-3-11-027421-9. (Geistes- und Sozialwissenschaften)
- Todesanzeige, Tages-Anzeiger, 15. Mai 2020, S. 26.
