= Aðalheiður Guðmundsdóttir =

Icelandic academic

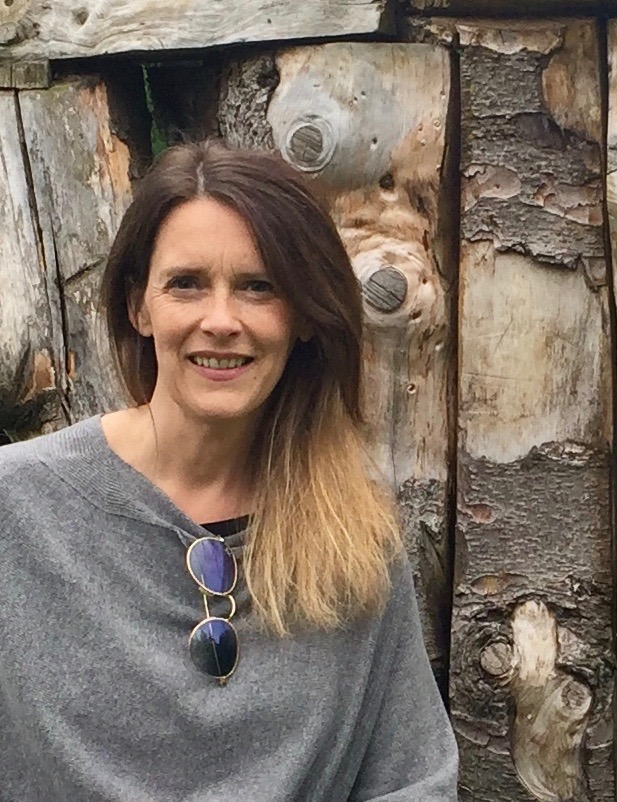
- Born: 7 March 1965 (age 61)
- Occupation: professor of medieval Icelandic literature
- Organization: University of Iceland

Aðalheiður Guðmundsdóttir (born 7 March 1965) is an Icelandic professor of medieval Icelandic literature at the University of Iceland.

== Career ==
Aðalheiður completed her matriculation examination from Verzlunarskóli Íslands in 1986, a BA in Icelandic from the University of Iceland in 1989, a Cand.mag. degree in Icelandic literature in 1993 and a Dr.phil. degree from the same university in 2002. Aðalheiður was a postdoctoral fellow at the Árni Magnússon Institute, funded by the Icelandic Centre for Research, from 2005 to 2007, a Sigurður Nordal research fellow at the same institute from 2008 to 2009, adjunct lecturer in folkloristics at the University of Iceland from 2009 and a senior lecturer in the same subject from 2012 to 2015. In 2016, she became a professor of Icelandic at the Faculty of Icelandic and Comparative Cultural Studies, University of Iceland.

Aðalheiður has held various positions of trust at the University of Iceland and elsewhere, e.g. head of the Department of Icelandic, board member for the University of Iceland Research Fund, the University of Iceland Centre for Medieval Studies, the Association of Icelandic Language Teachers and the Society of Folklorists (chair). She has participated in many international collaborative projects and teaching staff exchange programmes, having worked as a guest lecturer or exchange teacher at the University of the Faroe Islands, the University of Copenhagen, the University of Tartu, University College Dublin and the University of Rzeszów. She has also been a guest professor at the University of Siena.

She sits on various editorial and consulting boards, e.g. for the journal New Norse Studies: A Journal on the Literature and Culture of Medieval Scandinavia and Scripta Islandica.

== Research ==
Aðalheiður's main focuses in teaching and research are medieval Norse literature, legendary sagas, folktales, folk ballads and rímur (metrical romances), the history of dance and the history of magic. She has published books such as Úlfhams saga in 2001, Strengleikar in 2006 and Arfur aldanna I–II in 2021, as well as many academic papers. Her doctoral thesis, Úlfhams saga, discussed the metrical verses and the derived prose versions of the saga. The saga was adapted for the stage in Hafnarfjörður Theatre by the company Annað svið in 2004 and the opportunity was taken to record the rímur (metrical verses) and publish them on CD along with Aðalheiður's edition of the text, with explanatory notes.

== Awards ==
In 2016, she was awarded the Dag Strömbäck Prize by the Royal Gustavus Adolphus Academy in Uppsala for her achievements in the field of Norse studies and folkloristics. In 2022 she received the annual Hagþenkir award for academic work of outstanding quality for her two-volume work Arfur aldanna (2021).

== Personal life ==
Aðalheiður's parents are Guðmundur Þ. Jónasson (born 1942) and Ólöf S. Sigurjónsdóttir (born 1946). She is married to Guðvarður Már Gunnlaugsson, a philologist, and has three children. Aðalheiður has published short stories and poems and has won prizes for her writing.

== Bibliography ==
=== Books ===
- Aðalheiður Guðmundsdóttir. (2021). Handan Hindarfjalls. Arfur aldanna I. Reykjavík: Háskólaútgáfan.
- Aðalheiður Guðmundsdóttir. (2021). Norðvegur. Arfur aldanna II. Reykjavík: Háskólaútgáfan.
- Úlfhams saga. (2001). Aðalheiður Guðmundsdóttir sá um útgáfuna og ritaði inngang. Reykjavík: Stofnun Árna Magnússonar á Íslandi (cclxxxi + 63 pp.)
- Strengleikar. (2006) Aðalheiður Guðmundsdóttir sá um útgáfuna og ritar inngang. Reykjavík: Bókmenntafræðistofnun Háskóla Íslands.

=== Selected articles ===
- Aðalheiður Guðmundsdóttir. (2026). The Sorrows of Sǫrli the Lover: On the Icelandic mansöngur and Some Norse-Gaelic Contacts. New Studies on Emotions in Old Norse Literature. Eds. Brynja Þorgeirsdóttir, Gareth Lloyd Evans and Daniel Sävborg. Acta Scandinavica 17. Turnhout: Brepols (pp. 53–85).
- Aðalheiður Guðmundsdóttir. (2024). Übernatürliche Spinnerinnen in isländischen Volkserzählungen. Florilegium nordmannicum: Beiträge zur norrönen Kultur- und Literaturwissenschaft Nordeuropas. Festschrift für François-Xavier Dillmann. Ed. Alessia Bauer. Berlin/Boston: Wien: Fassbaender (pp. 3–25).
- Aðalheiður Guðmundsdóttir. (2021). Enchantment and Anger in Medieval Icelandic Literature and Later Folklore. Fictional Practice. Magic, Narration, and the Power of Imagination. [Aries Book Series: Texts and Studies in Western Esotericism]. Eds. Bernd-Christian Otto and Dirk Johannsen. Leiden: Brill (pp. 68–90).
- Aðalheiður Guðmundsdóttir. (2020). Arthurian Legend in Rímur and Ballads. Late Arthurian Tradition in Europe. Eds. Ásdís R. Magnúsdóttir an Hélène Tétrel. 5th vol. of La matière arthurienne tardive en Europe, 1270-1530. Ed. Christine Ferlampin-Acher. Rennes: Presses universitaires de Rennes (pp. 763–72).
- Aðalheiður Guðmundsdóttir. (2019). Of Wavering Flames and Fires: Northern Lights in Icelandic Sources. ARV 75 (pp. 95–128).
- Aðalheiður Guðmundsdóttir. (2018). Reflexes of the fornaldarsögur in Icelandic poetry. In Matthew Driscoll, Silvia Hufnagel, Philip Lavender and Beeke Stegmann (eds.), The legendary legacy: Transmission and reception of the Fornaldarsögur Norðurlanda (pp. 19–51).
- Aðalheiður Guðmundsdóttir. (2017). Some Heroic Motifs in Icelandic Art. Scripta Islandica 68: 11–49.
- Aðalheiður Guðmundsdóttir. (2016). "How Do You Know if it is Love or Lust?" On Gender, Status, and Violence in Old Norse Literature. Interfaces: A Journal of Medieval European Literatures, 2: 189–209.
- Aðalheiður Guðmundsdóttir. (2015). The Narrative Role of Magic in the Fornaldarsögur. ARV - Nordic Yearbook of Folklore (pp. 39–56).
- Aðalheiður Guðmundsdóttir. (2012). The Dancers of De la Gardie 11. Mediaeval Studies, 74: 307–330.
- Aðalheiður Guðmundsdóttir. (2012). Gunnarr and the Snake Pit in Medieval Art and Legend. Speculum. A Journal of Medieval Studies, 87(4): 1015–1049.
- Aðalheiður Guðmundsdóttir. (2007). The Werewolf in Medieval Icelandic literature. Journal of English and Germanic Philology, 106(3): 277–303.
- Aðalheiður Guðmundsdóttir. (2006). How Icelandic Legends Reflect the Prohibition on Dancing. ARV - Nordic Yearbook of Folklore, 61: 25–52.
- María Ellingsen. (2004). Úlfhamssaga.
- Ævintýragrunnur
