= Kemp Malone =

American historian (1889–1971)

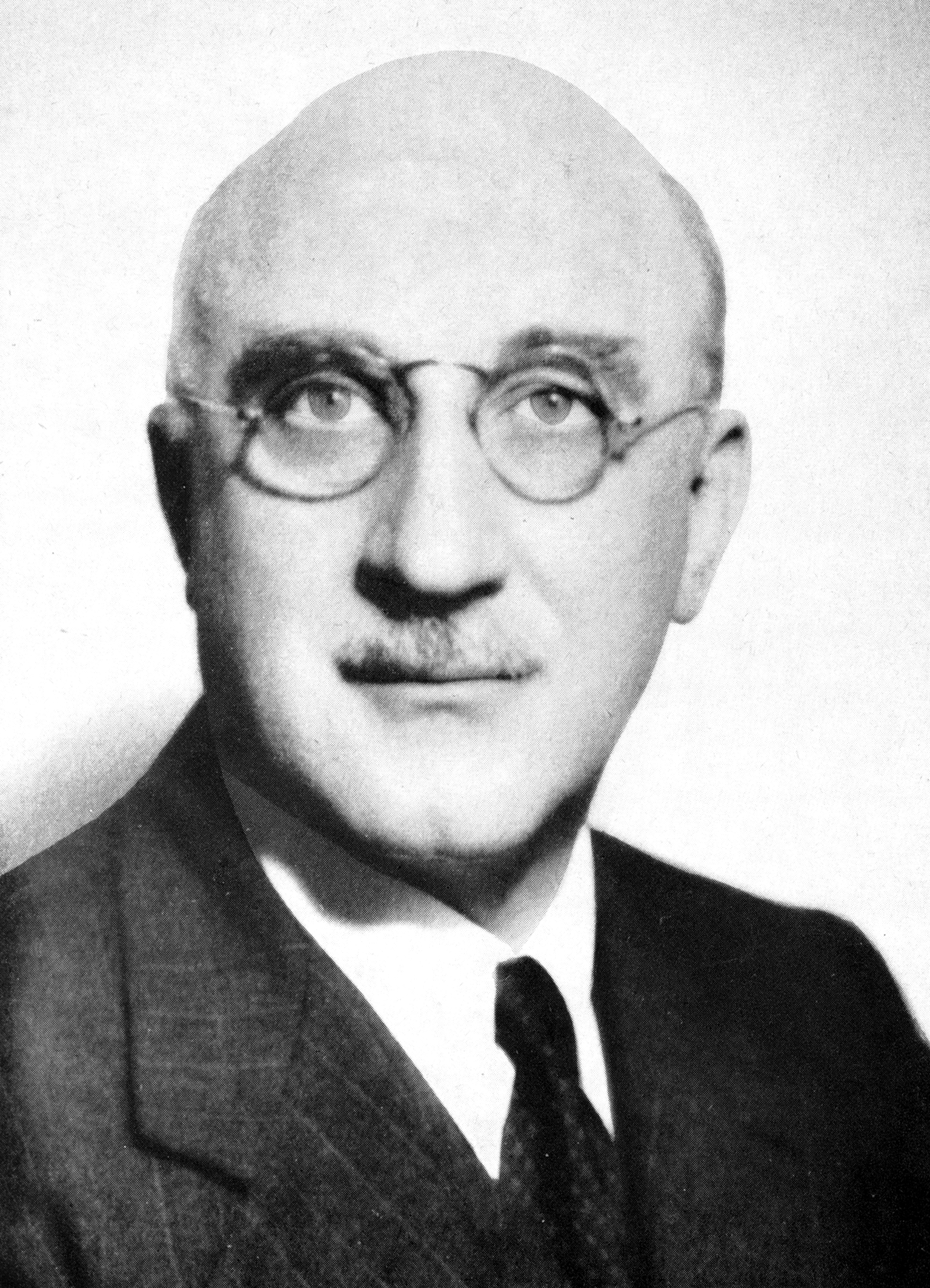
- Born: March 14, 1889; Minter City, Mississippi, U.S.
- Died: October 13, 1971 (aged 82); Eastport, Maine, U.S.

Academic background
- Education: University of Chicago
- Doctoral advisor: John Matthews Manly

Academic work
- Discipline: History of the English language
- Sub-discipline: Old English literature; Chaucer studies
- Military career
- Allegiance: United States
- Branch: United States Army
- Rank: Captain
- Conflicts: World War I

Kemp Malone (March 14, 1889 – October 13, 1971) was an American medievalist, etymologist, philologist, and specialist in Chaucer. He was a lecturer and then professor of English literature at Johns Hopkins University from 1924 to 1956.

== Life and career ==
Kemp Malone was born on March 14, 1889, in Minter City, Mississippi, the oldest of eight children born to a clergyman who had been the head of several women's colleges in Mississippi and Georgia. The historian and biographer Dumas Malone was his younger brother. Malone graduated from Emory College in 1907 at the age of eighteen and became a high school teacher for four years. He spent several years in Germany, Denmark and Iceland. He received his doctorate from the University of Chicago in 1919 under the direction of John Matthews Manly. When World War I broke out, he served two years in the United States Army and was discharged with the rank of captain.

Malone was elected to the American Philosophical Society in 1945. He served as president of the Modern Language Association, and other philological associations and was etymology editor of the American College Dictionary, 1947. With Louise Pound and Arthur G. Kennedy, he founded the journal American Speech, "to present information about English in America in a form appealing to general readers". He resisted the views of Old English poetry as products of a purely oral tradition. He contended that we must look to poets' individual elaboration of traditional structures: "A given poet was reckoned worthy if he handled with skill the stuff of which, by convention, poems must be made".

His interests ranged from 10th-century manuscripts to the etymology of contemporary comic strip names. American speech, the English language, the historical Arthur (his suggestion was the Roman dux Lucius Artorius Castus), Cædmon and Beowulf (he edited a facsimile of the Thorkelin transcripts, 1951), Deor – all were subjects among his hundreds of publications. He edited and translated a large corpus of medieval poetry, including Widsith from the Exeter Book (1936). A sample of his production is a 1941 published book about old English poems, that were transferred into modern English alliterative verse.

Kemp died unexpectedly at his house in Eastport, Maine, on October 13, 1971, following a stroke. Rare books from his library, donated 1971 to Emory University, are part of the Ancient and Medieval History (MARBL) collection, held at Robert W. Woodruff Library at Emory University Libraries. The Kemp Malone library content were fully registered under Call number Z997.M35. His literary heritage (thirty document boxes) were deposited in 1983 at Johns Hopkins University.
