= U35 =

U35 may refer to:

- Bochum Stadtbahn, a light rail line in North Rhine-Westphalia
- German submarine U-35, various vessels
- Great dodecahedron
- Small nucleolar RNA SNORD35
- Uppland Runic Inscription 35
