= Eadgils =

Semi-legendary Swedish king

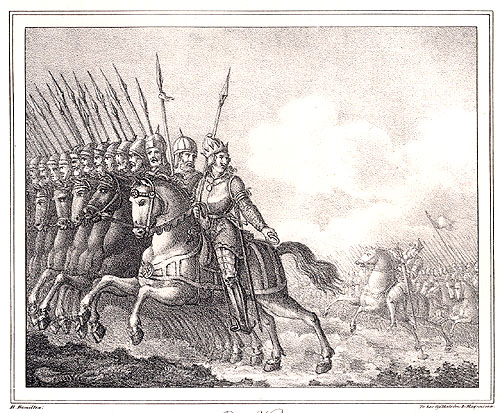
Eadgils pursuing Hrólfr Kraki on the Fyrisvellir, etching by Hugo Hamilton (1830)

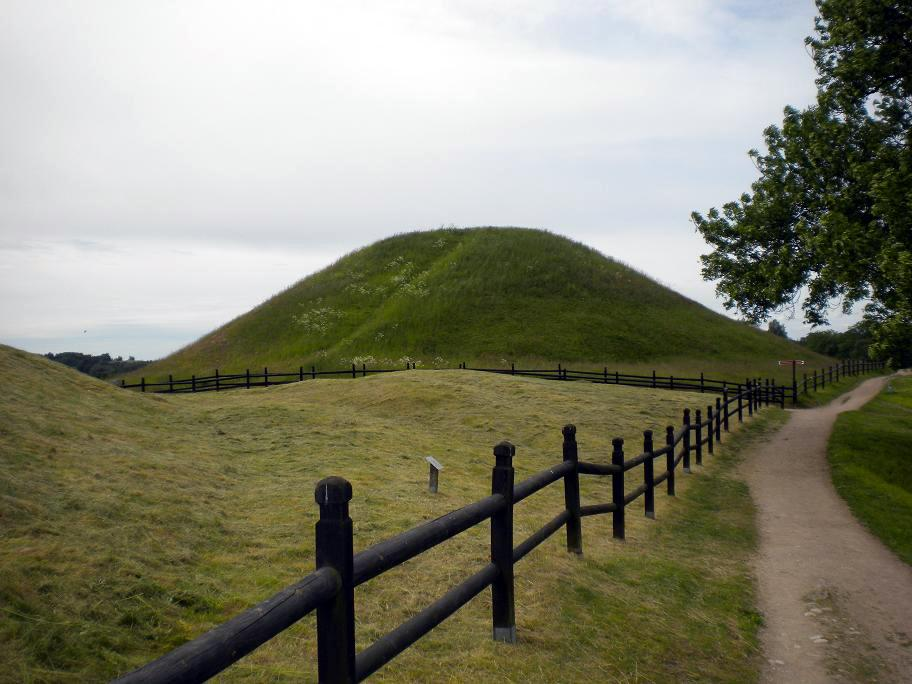
West royal tumulus at Old Uppsala, suggested grave of King Eadgils

Eadgils, Adils, Aðils, Adillus, Aðísl at Uppsölum, Athisl, Athislus or Adhel was a semi-legendary king of Sweden, who is estimated to have lived during the 6th century.

Beowulf and Old Norse sources present him as the son of Ohthere and as belonging to the ruling Yngling (Scylfing) dynasty. These sources also deal with his war against Onela, which he won with foreign assistance: in Beowulf he gained the throne of Sweden by defeating his uncle Onela with Geatish help, and in two Scandinavian sources (Skáldskaparmál and Skjöldunga saga), he is also helped to defeat Onela in the Battle on the Ice of Lake Vänern, but with Danish help. However, Scandinavian sources mostly deal with his interaction with the legendary Danish king Hrólfr Kraki (Hroðulf), and Eadgils is mostly presented in a negative light as a rich and greedy king. Snorri Sturluson, who documented many of the Scandinavian traditions, reported that the Swedes called him a "great king".

== Name ==
The Norse forms are based on an older (Proto-Norse) *Aþagīslaz (where *aþa is short for *aþala meaning "noble, foremost" (German 'adel') and *gīslaz means "arrow shaft"). However, the Anglo-Saxon form is not etymologically identical. The A-S form would have been *Ædgils, but Eadgils (Proto-Norse *Auða-gīslaz, *auða- meaning "wealth") was the only corresponding name used by the Anglo-Saxons. The name Aðils was so exceedingly rare even in Scandinavia that among almost 6000 Scandinavian runic inscriptions, it is only attested in three runestones (U 35, DR 221 and Br Olsen;215).

== Beowulf ==
The Anglo-Saxon epic poem Beowulf, composed sometime between the 8th century and the 11th century, is (beside the Norwegian skaldic poem Ynglingatal from the 9th century) the oldest source that mentions Eadgils.

The text of Beowulf implies that the Swedish king Ohthere died and that his younger brother Onela succeeded him, because Ohthere's two sons, Eadgils and Eanmund had to seek refuge with Heardred, Hygelac's son and successor as king of the Geats. This caused Onela to attack the Geats, and Heardred was killed. Onela returned home and Beowulf succeeded Heardred as the king of Geatland. In the following lines, Onela is referred to as the Scylfings' helmet and the son of Ongenþeow, whereas Eadgils and Eanmund are referred to as the sons of Ohtere:

| ...Hyne wræc-mæcgas ofer sæ sohtan, · suna Ohteres: hæfdon hy forhealden · helm Scylfinga, þone selestan · sæ-cyninga, þara þe in Swio-rice · sinc brytnade, mærne þeoden. · Him þæt to mearce wearð; he þær orfeorme · feorh-wunde hleat sweordes swengum, · sunu Hygelaces; and him eft gewat · Ongenþiowes bearn hames niosan, · syððan Heardred læg; let þone brego-stol · Biowulf healdan, Geatum wealdan: · þæt wæs god cyning. | ...Wandering exiles sought him o'er seas, the sons of Ohtere, who had spurned the sway of the Scylfings'-helmet, the bravest and best that broke the rings, in Swedish land, of the sea-kings' line, haughty hero. Hence Heardred's end. For shelter he gave them, sword-death came, the blade's fell blow, to bairn of Hygelac; but the son of Ongentheow sought again house and home when Heardred fell, leaving Beowulf lord of Geats and gift-seat's master. – A good king he! |

Later in the poem, it tells that during the battle, Eadgils's brother Eanmund was killed by Onela's champion Weohstan, Wiglaf's father. In the following lines, Eanmund also appears as the son of Ohtere and as a brother's child:

| ...hond rond gefeng, geolwe linde, · gomel swyrd geteah, þæt wæs mid eldum · Eanmundes laf, suna Ohteres, · þam æt sæcce wearð wracu wine-leasum · Weohstanes bana meces ecgum, · and his magum ætbær brun-fagne helm, · hringde byrnan, eald sweord eotonisc, · þæt him Onela forgeaf, his gædelinges · guð-gewædu, fyrd-searo fuslic: · no ymbe þa fæhðe spræc, þeah þe he his broðor · bearn abredwade. | ...The linden yellow, his shield, he seized; the old sword he drew: -- as heirloom of Eanmund earth-dwellers knew it, who was slain by the sword-edge, son of Ohtere, friendless exile, erst in fray killed by Weohstan, who won for his kin brown-bright helmet, breastplate ringed, old sword of Eotens, Onela's gift, weeds of war of the warrior-thane, battle-gear brave: though a brother's child had been felled, the feud was unfelt by Onela. |

Eadgils, however, survived and later, Beowulf helped Eadgils with weapons and warriors. Eadgils won the war and killed his uncle Onela. In the following lines, Eadgils is mentioned by name and as the son of Ohtere, whereas Onela is referred to as the king:

| Se þæs leod-hryres · lean gemunde uferan dogrum, · Eadgilse wearð fea-sceaftum feond. · Folce gestepte ofer sæ side · sunu Ohteres wigum and wæpnum: · he gewræc syððan cealdum cear-siðum, · cyning ealdre bineat. | The fall of his lord he was fain to requite in after days; and to Eadgils he proved friend to the friendless, and forces sent over the sea to the son of Ohtere, weapons and warriors: well repaid he those care-paths cold when the king he slew. |

This event also appears in the Scandinavian sources Skáldskaparmál and Skjöldunga saga – see below.

Family tree of the Scyldings (Kings of the Danes), Heathobards and Scylfings (Kings of the Swedes), according to Beowulf

♕ Heremod
♕ Scyld Scefing
♕ Beowulf
♕ Healfdene | ♕ Ongentheow
♕ Heorogar | ♕ Hrothgar | Wealhtheow | Halga | A daughter | ♕ Onela | ♕ Ohthere
Heoroweard | Hrethric | Hrothmund | Hrothulf | Froda | Eanmund | Eadgils
Freawaru | Ingeld

== Norse sources ==
The allusive manner in which Eadgils and his relatives are referred to in Beowulf suggests that the scop expected his audience to have sufficient background knowledge about Eadgils, Ohthere and Eanmund to understand the references. Likewise, in the roughly contemporary Norwegian Ynglingatal, Eadgils (Aðils) is called Onela's enemy (Ála dólgr), which likewise suggests that the conflict was familiar to the skald and his audience.

The tradition of Eadgils and Onela resurfaces in several Old Norse works in prose and poetry, and another matter also appears: the animosity between Eadgils and Hrólfr Kraki, who corresponds to Hroðulf in Beowulf.

=== Ynglingatal ===
The skaldic poem Ynglingatal is a poetic recital of the line of the Yngling clan, dedicating one stanza to each king. The Ynglingar are also called Skilfingar in the poem (Ynglingatal 19), a name that appears in its Anglo-Saxon form Scylfingas in Beowulf when referring to Eadgils' clan.

Although its age has been debated, most scholars hold to the traditional date of Ynglingatal from the 9th century and its attribution to the Norwegian skald Þjóðólfr of Hvinir. The poem survives in quotation in Snorri Sturluson's Ynglinga saga, a part of his Heimskringla and in Latin summary in the Norwegian historical work Historia Norvegiæ.

The poem presents Aðils (Eadgils) as the successor of Óttarr (Ohthere) and the predecessor of Eysteinn. The relevant stanza refers to his accidental death when he fell from his horse:

Þat frák enn,
at Aðils fjǫrvi
vitta véttr
of viða skyldi.
Ok dáðgjarn
af drasils bógum
Freys ôttungr
falla skyldi.
Ok við aur
ægir hjarna
bragnings burs
of blandinn varð.
Ok dáðsæll
deyja skyldi
Ála dolgr
at Uppsǫlum.

‘I have learned, further, that the creature of charms [SORCERESS] had to destroy the life of Aðils. And the deed-eager descendant of Freyr [= Swedish king] had to fall off the back of the steed. And the sea [fluid] of the brains of the son of the ruler [RULER] was blended with mud. And the deed-fortunate enemy of Áli had to die at Uppsala.’

Note that Eadgils' animosity with Onela also appears in Ynglingatal, as Aðils is referred to as the enemy of Áli (Ála dólgr). This animosity is treated in more detail in the Skjöldunga saga and Skáldskaparmál, which follow.

The Historia Norwegiæ, which is a terse summary of Ynglingatal in Latin, only states that Eadgils fell from his horse and died during the sacrifices. In the translation, the Dísir are rendered as the Roman goddess Diana:

Cujus filius Adils vel Athisl ante ædem Dianæ, dum idolorum, sacrificia fugeret, equo lapsus exspiravit. Hic genuit Eustein, [ ... ]

His son Adils gave up the ghost after falling from his horse before the temple of Diana, while he was performing the sacrifices made to idols. He became sire to Øystein, [ ... ]

The same information is found the Swedish Chronicle from the mid-15th century, which calls him Adhel. It is probably based on the Historia Norwegiæ tradition and says that he fell from his horse and died while he worshipped his god.

=== Íslendingabók ===
In Íslendingabók from the early 12th century, Eadgils only appears as a name in the listing of the kings of the Yngling dynasty as Aðísl at Uppsala. The reason what that the author, Ari Þorgilsson, traced his ancestry from Eadgils, and its line of succession is the same as that of Ynglingatal.

i Yngvi Tyrkjakonungr. ii Njörðr Svíakonungr. iii Freyr. iiii Fjölnir. sá er dó at Friðfróða. v Svegðir. vi Vanlandi. vii Visburr. viii Dómaldr. ix Dómarr. x Dyggvi. xi Dagr. xii Alrekr. xiii Agni. xiiii Yngvi. xv Jörundr. xvi Aun inn gamli. xvii Egill Vendilkráka. xviii Óttarr. xix Aðísl at Uppsölum. xx Eysteinn. xxi Yngvarr. xxii Braut-Önundr. xxiii Ingjaldr inn illráði. xxiiii Óláfr trételgja...

As can be seen it agrees with the earlier Ynglingatal and Beowulf in presenting Eadgils as the successor of Óttarr (Ohthere).

=== Skjöldunga saga ===
The Skjöldunga saga was a Norse saga which is believed to have been written in the period 1180–1200. The original version is lost, but it survives in a Latin summary by Arngrímur Jónsson. Arngrímur's summary relates that Eadgils, called Adillus, married Yrsa with whom he had the daughter Scullda. Some years later, the Danish king Helgo (Halga) attacked Sweden and captured Yrsa, not knowing that she was his own daughter, the result of Helgo raping Olava, the queen of the Saxons. Helgo raped Yrsa as well and took her back to Denmark, where she bore the son Rolfo (Hroðulf). After a few years, Yrsa's mother, queen Olava, came to visit her and told her that Helgo was her own father. In horror, Yrsa returned to Adillus, leaving her son behind. Helgo died when Rolfo was eight years old, and Rolfo succeeded him, and ruled together with his uncle Roas (Hroðgar). Not much later, Roas was killed by his half-brothers Rærecus and Frodo, whereupon Rolfo became the sole king of Denmark.

In Sweden, Yrsa and Adillus married Scullda to the king of Öland, Hiørvardus/Hiorvardus/Hevardus (Heoroweard). As her half-brother Rolfo was not consulted about this marriage, he was infuriated and he attacked Öland and made Hiørvardus and his kingdom tributary to Denmark.

After some time, there was animosity between king Adillus of Sweden and the Norwegian king Ale of Oppland. They decided to fight on the ice of Lake Vänern. Adillus won and took his helmet, chainmail and horse. Adillus won because he had requested Rolfo's aid against king Ale and Rolfo had sent him his berserkers. However, Adillus refused to pay the expected tribute for the help and so Rolfo came to Uppsala to claim his recompense. After surviving some traps, Rolfo fled with Adillus' gold, helped by his mother Yrsa. Seeing that the Swedish king and his men pursued him, Rolfo "sowed" the gold on the Fyrisvellir, so that the king's men would pick up the gold, instead of continuing the pursuit.

As can be seen, the Skjöldunga saga retells the story of Eadgils fighting his uncle Onela, but in this version Onela is no longer Eadgils' uncle, but a Norwegian king of Oppland. This change is generally considered to be a late confusion between the core province of the Swedes, Uppland, and its Norwegian namesake Oppland. Whereas, Beowulf leaves the Danish court with the suspicion that Hroðulf (Rolfo Krage, Hrólfr Kraki) might claim the Danish throne for himself at the death of Hroðgar (Roas, Hróarr), it is exactly what he does in Scandinavian tradition. A notable difference is that, in Beowulf, Eadgils receives the help of the Geatish king Beowulf against Onela, whereas it is the Danish king Hroðulf who provides help in Scandinavian tradition.

=== Skáldskaparmál ===
Skáldskaparmál was written by Snorri Sturluson, c. 1220, in order to teach the ancient art of kennings to aspiring skalds. It presents Eadgils, called Aðils, in two sections.

The first section is the Kálfsvísa of which Snorri quotes small parts:

| Ali Hrafni, es til íss riðu, en annarr austr und Aðilsi grár hvarfaði, geiri undaðr. | Áli rode Hrafn, They who rode onto the ice: But another, southward, Under Adils, A gray one, wandered, Wounded with the spear. |

This is a reference to the Battle on the Ice of Lake Vänern, during which Eadgils slew Onela and which also appears in the Skjöldunga saga. There is also second stanza, where Eadgils is riding his horse Slöngvir, apparently a combination famous enough to be mentioned.

| Björn reið Blakki, en Bíarr Kerti, Atli Glaumi, en Aðils Sløngvi, Högni Hölkvi, en Haraldr Fölkvi, Gunnarr Gota, en Grana Sigurðr. | Björn rode Blakkr, And Bjárr rode Kertr; Atli rode Glaumr, And Adils on Slöngvir; Högni on Hölvir, And Haraldr on Fölkvir; Gunnarr rode Goti, And Sigurdr, Grani. |

Eadgils' horse Slöngvir also appears in Snorri's later work, the Ynglinga saga.

Snorri also presents the story of Aðils and Hrólfr Kraki (Hroðulf) in order to explain why gold was known by the kenning Kraki's seed. Snorri relates that Aðils was in war with a Norwegian king named Áli (Onela), and they fought in the Battle on the Ice of Lake Vänern. Aðils was married to Yrsa, the mother of Hrólfr and so sent an embassy to Hrólfr asking him for help against Áli. He would receive three valuable gifts in recompense. Hrólfr was involved in a war against the Saxons and could not come in person but sent his twelve berserkers, including Böðvarr Bjarki. Áli died in the war, and Aðils took Áli's helmet Battle-boar and his horse Raven. The berserkers demanded three pounds of gold each in pay, and they demanded to choose the gifts that Aðils had promised Hrólfr, that is the two pieces of armour that nothing could pierce: the helmet battle-boar and the mailcoat Finn's heritage. They also wanted the famous ring Svíagris. Aðils considered the pay outrageous and refused.

When Hrólfr heard that Aðils refused to pay, he set off to Uppsala. They brought the ships to the river Fyris and rode directly to the Swedish king's hall at Uppsala with his twelve berserkers. Yrsa welcomed them and led them to their lodgings. Fires were prepared for them and they were given drinks. However, so much wood was heaped on the fires that the clothes started to burn away from their clothes. Hrólfr and his men had enough and threw the courtiers on the fire. Yrsa arrived and gave them a horn full of gold, the ring Svíagris and asked them to flee. As they rode over the Fyrisvellir, they saw Aðils and his men pursuing them. The fleeing men threw the gold on the plain so that the pursuers would stop to collect it. Aðils, however, continued the chase on his horse Slöngvir. Hrólfr then threw Svíagris and saw how Aðils stooped down to pick up the ring with his spear. Hrólfr exclaimed that he had seen the mightiest man in Sweden bend his back.

=== Ynglinga saga ===
The Ynglinga saga was written c. 1225 by Snorri Sturluson and he used Skjöldunga saga as a source when he told the story of Aðils. Snorri relates that Aðils succeeded his father Óttar (Ohthere) and betook himself to pillage the Saxons, whose king was Geirþjófr and queen Alof the Great. The king and consort were not at home, and so Aðils and his men plundered their residence at ease driving cattle and captives down to the ships. One of the captives was a remarkably beautiful girl named Yrsa, and Snorri writes that everyone was soon impressed with the well-mannered, pretty and intelligent girl. Most impressed was Aðils who made her his queen.

Some years later, Helgi (Halga), who ruled in Lejre, attacked Sweden and captured Yrsa. As he did not know that Yrsa was his own daughter, he raped her, and took her back to Lejre, where they had a son, Hrólfr kraki. When the boy was three years of age, Yrsa's mother, queen Alof of Saxony, came to visit her and told her that her husband Helgi was her own father. Horrified, Yrsa returned to Aðils, leaving her son behind, and stayed in Sweden for the rest of her life. When Hrólfr was eight years old, Helgi died during a war expedition and Hrólfr was proclaimed king.

Aðils waged a war against king Áli (Onela of Oppland), and they fought in the Battle on the Ice of Lake Vänern. Áli died in this battle. Snorri writes that there was a long account of this battle in the Skjöldunga Saga, which also contained an account of how Hrólf came to Uppsala and sowed gold on the Fyrisvellir.

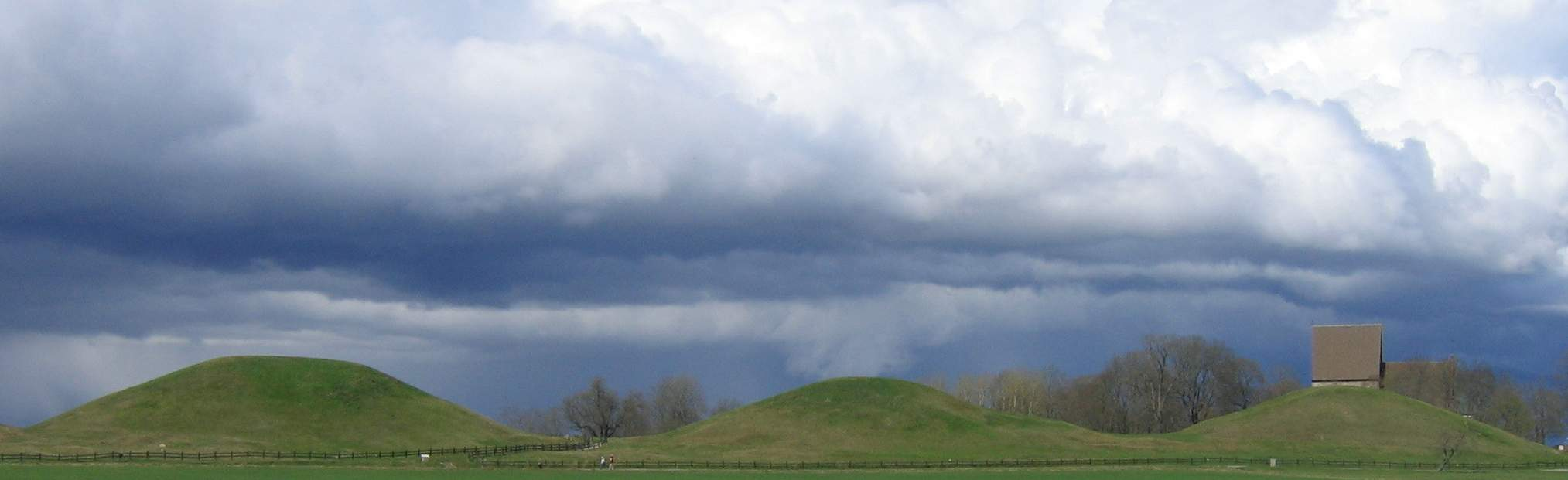
The three large royal mounds at Gamla Uppsala.

Snorri also relates that Aðils loved good horses and had the best horses in his days (the contemporary Gothic scholar Jordanes noted that the Swedes were famed for their good horses). One horse was named Slöngvi and another one Raven, which he had taken from Áli. From this horse he had bred a horse also named Raven which he sent to king Godgest of Hålogaland, but Godgest could not manage it and fell from it and died, in Omd on the island of Andøya. Aðils himself died in a similar way at the Dísablót. Aðils was riding around the Disa shrine when Raven stumbled and fell, and the king was thrown forward and hit his skull on a stone. The Swedes called him a great king and buried him at Uppsala. He was succeeded by Eysteinn.

=== Hrólfr Kraki's saga ===
Hrólfr Kraki's saga is believed to have been written in the period c. 1230 – c. 1450. Helgi and Yrsa lived happily together as husband and wife, not knowing that Yrsa was Helgi's daughter. Yrsa's mother queen Oluf travelled to Denmark to tell her daughter the truth. Yrsa was shocked and although Helgi wanted their relationship to remain as it was, Yrsa insisted on leaving him to live alone. She was later taken by the Swedish king Aðils as his queen, which made Helgi even more unhappy. Helgi went to Uppsala to fetch her, but was killed by Aðils in battle. In Lejre, he was succeeded by his son Hrólfr Kraki.

After some time, Böðvarr Bjarki encouraged Hrólfr to go Uppsala to claim the gold that Aðils had taken from Helgi after the battle. Hrólfr departed with 120 men and his twelve berserkers and during a rest they were tested by a farmer called Hrani (Odin in disguise) who advised Hrólfr to send back all his troops but his twelve berserkers, as numbers would not help him against Aðils.

They were at first well received, but in his hall, Aðils did his best to stop Hrólfr with pit traps and hidden warriors who attacked the Danes. Finally Aðils entertained them but put them to a test where they had to endure immense heat by a fire. Hrólfr and his berserkers finally had enough and threw the courtiers, who were feeding the fire, into the fire and leapt at Aðils. The Swedish king disappeared through a hollow tree trunk that stood in his hall.

Yrsa admonished Aðils for wanting to kill her son, and went to meet the Danes. She gave them a man named Vöggr to entertain them. This Vöggr remarked that Hrólfr had the thin face of a pole ladder, a Kraki. Happy with his new cognomen Hrólfr gave Vöggr a golden ring, and Vöggr swore to avenge Hrólfr if anyone should kill him. Hrólfr and his company were then attacked by a troll in the shape of a boar in the service of Aðils, but Hrólfr's dog Gram killed it.

They then found out that Aðils had set the hall on fire, and so they broke out of the hall, only to find themselves surrounded by heavily armed warriors in the street. After a fight, king Aðils retreated to summon reinforcements.

Yrsa then provided her son with a silver drinking horn filled with gold and jewels and a famous ring, Svíagris. Then she gave Hrólfr and his men twelve of the Swedish king's best horses, and all the armour and provisions they needed.

Hrólfr bid a fond farewell to his mother and departed over the Fyrisvellir. When they saw Aðils and his warriors in pursuit, they spread the gold behind themselves. Aðils saw his precious Svíagris on the ground and stooped to pick it up with his spear, whereupon Hrólfr cut his back with his sword and screamed in triumph that he had bent the back of the most powerful man in Sweden.

== Danish sources ==
=== Chronicon Lethrense ===
The Chronicon Lethrense tell that when the Danish kings Helghe (Halga) and Ro (Hroðgar) were dead, the Swedish king Athisl forced the Daner to accept a dog as king. The dog king was succeeded by Rolf Krage (Hrólfr Kraki).

The family tree of legendary Kings of the Danes, according to Chronicon Lethrense

Kings of the Danes are marked with a crown (♕).

Ypper, King of Uppsala ♂
KEY
Nori ♂ | Østen ♂ | ♕ Dan ♂ | Dannia ♀ | Marriage or coupling
Parent and child
Rolfcarl, aka Rolf, a baron ♂ | ♕ Ro ♂ | Ro's wife ♀ | Succession by other means
Thora ♀
♕ Helgi ♂ | ♕ Haldan ♂
Athisl, King of Swethia ♂ | Ursula ♀ | ♕ Raka, a dog ♂
Siward Albus ♂ | ♕ Snyo ♂
♕ Hiarwart ♂ | Sculd ♀ | ♕ Rolf Kraki ♂
Hamund ♂
♕ Aki ♂ | Haghbard ♂ | daughter of Rolf Kraki ♀ | ♕ Fritleff ♂
♕ Frothi Largus ♂
♕ Ingyald ♂
♕ Olav ♂
♕ Asa ♀
♕ Harald Hildetan (war-tooth) ♂
♕ Hethae ♀

The source used for the genealogical information and name spellings is the English translation provided by Mischa Hooker of Augustana College.

=== Gesta Danorum ===
The Gesta Danorum (book 2), by Saxo Grammaticus, tells that Helgo (Halga) repelled a Swedish invasion, killed the Swedish king Hothbrodd, and made the Swedes pay tribute. However, he committed suicide due to shame for his incestuous relationship with Urse (Yrsa), and his son Roluo (Hrólfr Kraki) succeeded him.

The new king of Sweden, Athislus, thought that the tribute to the Daner might be smaller if he married the Danish king's mother and so took Urse for a queen. However, after some time, Urse was so upset with the Swedish king's greediness that she thought out a ruse to run away from the king and at the same time liberate him of his wealth. She incited Athislus to rebel against Roluo, and arranged so that Roluo would be invited and promised a wealth in gifts.

At the banquet Roluo was at first not recognised by his mother, but when their fondness was commented on by Athisl, the Swedish king and Roluo made a wager where Roluo would prove his endurance. Roluo was placed in front of a fire that exposed him to such heat that finally a maiden could suffer the sight no more and extinguished the fire. Roluo was greatly recompensed by Athisl for his endurance.

When the banquet had lasted for three days, Urse and Roluo escaped from Uppsala, early in the morning in carriages where they had put all the Swedish king's treasure. In order to lessen their burden, and to occupy any pursuing warriors they spread gold in their path (later in the work, this is referred to as "sowing the Fyrisvellir"), although there was a rumour that she only spread gilded copper. When Athislus, who was pursuing the escapers saw that a precious ring was lying on the ground, he bent down to pick it up. Roluo was pleased to see the king of Sweden bent down, and escaped in the ships with his mother.

Roluo later defeated Athislus and gave Sweden to young man named Hiartuar (Heoroweard), who also married Roluo's sister Skulde. When Athislus learnt that Hiartuar and Skulde had killed Roluo, he celebrated the occasion, but he drank so much that he killed himself.

The family tree of legendary Kings of the Danes, according to the Gesta Danorum (Books 1 to 9)

Kings of the Danes are marked with a crown (♕). Kings of the Swedes are marked with a dagger (†). Superscript numbers after a name indicate in which books of Gesta Danorum the individual is mentioned.

Humblus ♂ ^{(1)}
KEY
Angul ♂ ^{(1)} | ♕ Dan I ♂ ^{(1)} | Grytha ♀ ^{(1)} | Marriage or coupling
Parent and child
The Angles | ♕ Humblus ♂ ^{(1)} | ♕ Lotherus ♂ ^{(1)} | King of the Saxons ♂ ^{(1)} | Succession by other or unclear means
Roarus ♂ ^{(1)}
Sigtrugus, King of the Swedes† ♂ ^{(1)} | ♕ Skioldus ♂ ^{(1)} | Alvilda ♀ ^{(1)}
daughter of Roarus ♀ ^{(1)} | Bessus ♂ ^{(1)}
sister of Gram ♀ ^{(1)} | Gro ♀ ^{(1)} | ♕ Gram† ♂ ^{(1)} | Sumblus, King of the Finns ♂ ^{(1)}
Wagnofthus ♂ ^{(1)}
Signe ♀ ^{(1)} | Henricus, King of the Saxons ♂ ^{(1)} | Haquinus, King of the Nitherians ♂ ^{(1)}
Harthgrepa ♀ ^{(1)}
♕Suibdagerus, King of Norway† ♂ ^{(1)} | sister of Guthormus ♀ ^{(1)} | ♕Guthormus ♂ ^{(1)} | ♕Hadingus ♂ ^{(1,2,4,5)} | Regnilda ♀ ^{(1)}
Asmundus† ♂ ^{(1)} | Gunnilda ♀ ^{(1)} | Guthormus ♂ ^{(1)}
Ulvilda ♀ ^{(1,2)} | ♕ Ubbo ♂ ^{(2)}
Henricus ♂ ^{(1)} | Uffo† ♂ ^{(1)} | Hundingus† ♂ ^{(1,2)} | Thorilda ♀ ^{(2)} | Scottus ♂ ^{(2)}
daughter of Uffo ♀ ^{(1)} | Regnerus† ♂ ^{(2)} | Suanhuita ♀ ^{(2)} | sisters of Suanhuita ♀♀ ^{(2)} | Andwan, King of the Hellespont ♂ ^{(2)}
Thoraldus ♂ ^{(2)}
♕ Frotho I ♂ ^{(2,5)} | daughter of Andwan ♀ ^{(2)}
Hothbrodus† ♂ ^{(2,3)} | ♕ Haldanus I ♂ ^{(2)} | Roe ♂ ^{(2)} | Skato ♂ ^{(2)}
Thora ♀ ^{(2)}
♕ Helgo ♂ ^{(2,3)} | ♕ Roe ♂ ^{(2)}
Athislus† ♂ ^{(2,3)} | Ursa ♀ ^{(2)}
King Gevarus ♂ ^{(2,3)} | ♕ Rolvo Krake† ♂ ^{(2,3)} | Ruta ♀ ^{(2)} | Biarco ♂ ^{(2)} | Sculda ♀ ^{(2)} | ♕Hiarwarthus † ♂ ^{(2,3)}
♕ Hotherus† ♂ ^{(2,3)} | Nanna ♀ ^{(3)} | Herlecus ♂ ^{(3)} | Gericus ♂ ^{(3)}
former King of Britain ♂ ^{(3)} | mother of the King of Britain ♀ ^{(3)} | a slave ♂ ^{(3)} | a bondmaid ♀ ^{(3)} | ♕ Roricus Slyngebond ♂ ^{(3)} | Gerwendillus ♂ ^{(3)}
King of Britain ♂ ^{(3,4)} | Queen of Britain ♀ ^{(3,4)} | Gerutha ♀ ^{(3,4)} | Horwendillus ♂ ^{(3,4)} | Fengo ♂ ^{(3,4)}
foster sister of Amlethus ♀ ^{(3,4)} | daughter of the King of Britain ♀ ^{(3,4)} | Amlethus ♂ ^{(3,4)} | Herminthruda, Queen of Scotland ♀ ^{(4)} | ♕ Wiglecus ♂ ^{(4)}
son of Amlethus ♂ ^{(4)} | ♕Wermundus ♂ ^{(4)} | Frowinus, governor of Sleswik ♂ ^{(4)}
♕ Uffo, or Olavus the Gentle ♂ ^{(4)} | daughter of Frowin ♀ ^{(4)} | Keto ♂ ^{(4)} | Wigo ♂ ^{(4)}
♕ Dan II ♂ ^{(4)}
♕ Huglecus ♂ ^{(4)}
♕ Frotho II, the Vigorous ♂ ^{(4)}
♕ Dan III ♂ ^{(4)}
Craca ♀ ^{(5)} | Regnerus ♂ ^{(5)} | Bracus ♂ ^{(5)} | ♕ Fridlevus I, the Swift ♂ ^{(4,5)} | Hun, King of the Huns ♂ ^{(5)} | Hun ♂ ^{(5)}
Gøtarus, King of Norway ♂ ^{(5)} | Westmarus ♂ ^{(5)} | Colo ♂ ^{(5)} | Gøtwara ♀ ^{(5)}
Rollerus ♂ ^{(5)} | Ericus the Shrewd-spoken† ♂ ^{(5,6)} | Gunwara the Fair ♀ ^{(5)} | Alvilda ♀ ^{(5)} | ♕ Frotho III ♂ ^{(5,6)} | Hanunda ♀ ^{(5)} | Grep (eldest of three) ♂ ^{(5)} | 11 other sons (two named Grep) ♂♂ ^{(5)}
Hythin, King of Tellemark ♂ ^{(6)} | Alvo ♂ ^{(5)} | Ofura ♀ ^{(5)} | Arngrimus ♂ ^{(5)} | Grubbus ♂ ^{(6)} | ♕ Hiarnus ♂ ^{(6)} | Amundus, King of Norway ♂ ^{(6)}
child of Hythin ^{(6)} | Haldanus† ♂ ^{(6)} | 12 sons, including Angantir ♂♂ ^{(5)} | Ano ♂ ^{(6)} | Iuritha ♀ ^{(6)} | ♕ Fridlevus II ♂ ^{(6)} | Frogertha ♀ ^{(6)}
Hanevus, King of Saxony ♂ ^{(6)} | Suertingus, King of Saxony ♂ ^{(6)} | Olavus ♂ ^{(6)} | ♕ Frotho IV ♂ ^{(6)}
Sywardus† ♂ ^{(6,7)} | sons of Suertingus ♂♂ ^{(6)} | sister of the sons of Suertingus ♀ ^{(6)} | ♕ Ingellus ♂ ^{(6,7)} | Helga ♀ ^{(6)} | Helgo ♂ ^{(6)} | Asa ♀ ^{(6)}
three sons that died in war ♂♂ ^{(7)} | ♕ Olavus I ♂ ^{(7)} | Karolus, governor of Gothland ♂ ^{(7)}
Ulvilda ♀ ^{(7)} | ♕ Frotho V ♂ ^{(7)} | Hatherus ♂ ^{(7)} | ♕ Haraldus I ♂ ^{(7)} | Sygne ♀ ^{(7)}
Ericus† ♂ ^{(7)} | Thorhilda ♀ ^{(7)} | ♕ Haldanus II Biargrammus† ♂ ^{(7)} | ♕Haraldus II ♂ ^{(7)}
Ebbo ♂ ^{(7)} | mother of Otharus ♀ ^{(7)} | ♕ Unguinus, King of the Goths ♂ ^{(7)} | Asmundus ♂ ^{(7)}
sister of Otharus ♀ ^{(7)} | ♕ Sywaldus I ♂ ^{(7)} | Sygrutha ♀ ^{(7)} | Kings of Norway
Sywardus, King of the Goths ♂ ^{(7)} | mother of Alvilda ♀ ^{(7)} | Otharus ♂ ^{(7)} | Syritha ♀ ^{(7)} | ♕ Sygarus ♂ ^{(7)} | queen of Sygarus ♀ ^{(7)} | Hamundus, a petty king ♂ ^{(7)}
Wemundus ♂ ^{(7)} | Ostenus ♂ ^{(7)} | ♕Sywaldus II ♂ ^{(7)} | Algerus ♂ ^{(7)} | Helwin ♂ ^{(7)} | Hamundus ♂ ^{(7)}
Regnaldus, King of the Northmen ♂ ^{(7)} | Alvilda ♀ ^{(7)} | Alf ♂ ^{(7)} | Sygne ♂ ^{(7)} | Hagbarthus ♂ ^{(7)} | Hako ♂ ^{(7)}
Gro ♀ ^{(7)} | Borcarus ♂ ^{(7)} | Drota ♀ ^{(7)} | Gunnarus ♂ ^{(7)} | Hano, ruler of Funen ♂ ^{(7)} | Ostmarus, ruler of Scania ♂ ^{(7)} | Hundingus, ruler of Zealand ♂ ^{(7)} | Roricus, co-ruler of Jutland ♂ ^{(7)} | Hatherus, co-ruler of Jutland ♂ ^{(7)}
Haraldus ♂ ^{(7)} | Hildigerus ♂ ^{(7)} | Røtho, a Ruthenian pirate ♂ ^{(7)} | Wesetus ♂
♕Haldanus III ♂ ^{(7)} | Guritha ♀ ^{(7)}
Alverus† ♂ ^{(7,8)} | ♕ Haraldus III Hyldetan ♂ ^{(7)}
Olavus ♂ ^{(7)} | Ingo ♂ ^{(7)} | Ingeldus† ♂ ^{(7)} | sister of Haraldus ♀ ^{(7)} | Ubbo ♂ ^{(7)} | sister of Haraldus ♀ ^{(7)} | Sywardus ♂ ^{(7)} | sister of Haraldus ♀ ^{(7)} | Olavus, king of the Werms ♂ ^{(7)}
♕ Ringo I† ♂ ^{(7,8)} | ♕ Hetha ♀ ^{(8)} | ♕ Olo the Vigorous ♂ ^{(7,8)} | Esa ♀ ^{(7)} | son of the king ♂ ^{(7,8)}
Atylo the Scanian ♂ ^{(8)} | Ringo, ruler of Norway ♂ ^{(8)}
Tola ♂ ^{(8)} | Omothus, or Homothus ♂ ^{(8)} | daughter of Ringo ♀ ^{(8)} | Esa ♀ ^{(8)} | ♕ Omundus ♂ ^{(7,8)}
Sibbo ♂ ^{(8)} | sister of Gøtarus ♀ ^{(8)} | Gøtarus† ♂ ^{(8)} | daughter of Omundus ♀ ^{(8)} | ♕ Sywardus I ♂ ^{(8)} | ♕ Buthlus ♂ ^{(8)} | daughter of Omundus ♀ ^{(8)}
Ebbo ♂ ^{(8)}
early wife of Iarmericus ♀ ^{(8)} | ♕Iarmericus † ♂ ^{(8)} | Suanilda ♀ ^{(8)} | the Hellepontines, 4 brothers ♂♂ ^{(8)} | Iarmericus' sister, sold to Norwegians ♀ ^{(8)} | Iarmericus' sister, sold to Germans ♀ ^{(8)}
♕ Broderus ♂ ^{(8)} | nephews of Iarmericus ♂♂ ^{(8)}
King of the Goths ♂ ^{(8)} | ♕ Sywaldus III ♂ ^{(8)}
King of Sweden† ♂ ^{(8)} | daughter of the King of the Goths ♀ ^{(8)} | ♕ Snio ♂ ^{(8)}
♕ Biorn ♂ ^{(8)}
♕ Haraldus III ♂ ^{(8)}
a queen from Sweden ♀ ^{(8)} | ♕ Gormo I ♂ ^{(8)}
♕ Gotricus, or Godefridus ♂ ^{(8,9)}
♕ Olavus III ♂ ^{(9)} | daughter of Gotricus ♀ ^{(9)} | Sywardus, King of Norway ♂ ^{(9)} | unknown
♕Hemmingus ♂ ^{(9)} | ♕Siwardus II Ring ♂ ^{(9)} | ♕ Ringo II ♂ ^{(9)} | Herothus† ♂ ^{(9)} | Hesbernus ♂ ^{(9)}
ruler in Norway ♂ ^{(9)} | Lathgertha ♀ ^{(9)} | ♕Regnerus Lothbrog ♂ ^{(9)} | Thora ♀ ^{(9)}
Suanlogha ♀ ^{(9)} | a woman ♀ ^{(9)}
2 daughters ♀♀ ^{(9)} | Fridlevus ♂ ^{(9)} | ♕ Haraldus ♂ ^{(9)} | ♕ Siwardus & Ericus ♂♂ ^{(9)} | Rathbarthus ♂ ^{(9)} | Dunwatus ♂ ^{(9)} | Ubbo ♂ ^{(9)}
Regnaldus ♂ ^{(9)} | Withsercus ♂ ^{(9)} | Ericus Wind-hat ♂ ^{(9)} | Guthormus ♂ ^{(9)} | ♕ Ericus I ♂ ^{(9)} | ♕ Sywardus Snake-Eye ♂ ^{(9)} | Biornus ♂ ^{(9)} | Agnerus ♂ ^{(9)} | Ivarus ♂ ^{(9)}
daughter of Guthormus ♀ ^{(9)} | ♕ Ericus II ♂ ^{(9)}
♕ Kanutus I ♂ ^{(9)}
♕ Frotho VI ♂ ^{(9)}
♕ Gormo II the English ♂ ^{(9)}
♕ Haraldus V ♂ ^{(9)} | Hedelradus, King of England ♂ ^{(9)}
♕ Gormo III ♂ ^{(9)} | Thira ♀ ^{(9)}
Kanutus ♂ ^{(9)} | Haraldus VI ♂ ^{(9)}

Genealogical information is derived from Oliver Elton's 1905 translation, The First Nine Books of the Danish History of Saxo Grammaticus (via Wikisource). Name spellings are from the 1931 Latin critical edition by Olrik and Ræder (via Wikisource). Regnal numbers, which do not appear in the original text, are included for clarity and taken from the engraving Veræ effigies regum omnium by Erico Olai Tormio.

== Archaeology ==
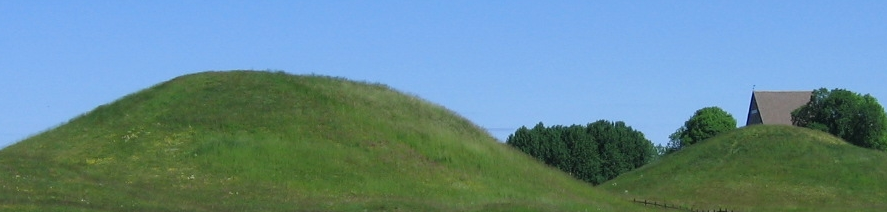
The mound to the left has been suggested to be the grave where Snorri Sturluson reported that Eadgils was buried. Archaeological finds are consistent with this identification.

According to Snorri Sturluson, Eadgils was buried at Gamla Uppsala. Birger Nerman suggested that he was buried in the Western mound (also known as Thor's mound) at Gamla Uppsala. An excavation in this mound showed that a man was buried there c. 575 on a bear skin with two dogs and rich grave offerings. There were luxurious weapons and other objects, both domestic and imported, show that the buried man was very powerful. These remains include a Frankish sword adorned with gold and garnets and a board game with Roman pawns of ivory. He was dressed in a costly suit made of Frankish cloth with golden threads, and he wore a belt with a costly buckle. There were four cameos from the Middle East which were probably part of a casket. The finds show the distant contacts of the House of Yngling in the 6th century.

Snorri's account that Adils had the best horses of his days, and Jordanes' account that the Swedes of the 6th century were famed for their horses find support in archaeology. This time was the beginning of the Vendel Age, a time characterised by the appearance of stirrups and a powerful mounted warrior elite in Sweden, with rich graves in for instance Valsgärde and Vendel.

== Bibliography and external links ==
- English translations of the Old Norse Hrólfs saga kraka ok kappa hans :
  - The Saga of Hrolf Kraki and his Champions. Trans. Peter Tunstall (2003). Available at Norse saga: The Saga of Hrolf Kraki and Northvegr: The Saga of Hrolf Kraki.
  - The Saga of King Hrolf Kraki. Translated by Jesse L. Byock. London: Penguin. 1998. ISBN 0-14-043593-X. Selection from this translation are available at The Viking Site: Excerpts from The Saga of King Hrolf Kraki.
  - "King Hrolf and his champions" included in Eirik the Red: And Other Icelandic Sagas. Translated by Gwyn Jones. Oxford: Oxford World's Classics, Oxford University Press. 1961. ISBN 0-19-283530-0.
- Original texts:
  - Hrólfs saga kraka ok kappa hans in Old Norse from heimskringla.no
  - University of Oregon: Norse: Fornaldarsögur norðurlanda: Hrólfs saga kraka ok kappa hans
  - Sagnanet: Hrólfs saga kraka
- Anderson, Poul (1973). Hrolf Kraki's Saga. New York: Ballantine Books. ISBN 0-345-23562-2. New York: Del Rey Books. ISBN 0-345-25846-0. Reprinted 1988 by Baen Books, ISBN 0-671-65426-8.
- Birger Nerman (1925). Det svenska rikets uppkomst (in Swedish).
- Beowulf:
- Beowulf read aloud in Old English
  - Modern English translation by Francis Barton Gummere
  - Modern English translation by John Lesslie Hall
  - Ringler, Dick (May 2005), Beowulf: A New Translation For Oral Delivery Searchable text with full audio available, from the University of Wisconsin-Madison Libraries.
  - Several different Modern English translations
- Chronicon Lethrense and Annales Lundense:
  - Chronicon Lethrense and Annales Lundense in translation by Peter Tunstall
  - The same translation at Northvegr
- Book 2 of Gesta Danorum at the Online and Medieval & Classical library
- The Relation of the Hrolfs Saga Kraka and the Bjarkarimur to Beowulf by Olson, 1916, at Project Gutenberg
- the Ynglinga saga in translation by Samuel Laing, 1844, at Northvegr
- The Gróttasöngr in Thorpe's translation
- Skáldskaparmál:
  - Snorri Sturluson's Prose Edda in the original language
  - CyberSamurai Encyclopedia of Norse Mythology: Prose Edda – Skáldskaparmál (English)
  - CyberSamurai Encyclopedia of Norse Mythology: Prose Edda – Skáldskaparmál (Old Norse)
- Krag, C. (1991), Ynglingatal og Ynglingesaga: en studie i historiske kilder, Oslo
- Sundquist, O. (2004), Freyr"s offspring. Rulers and religion in ancient Svea society

Eadgils House of Yngling
| Preceded by Ohthere or Onela | Legendary king of Sweden | Succeeded by Eysteinn |
