= Vendel Period =

Period of Swedish prehistory (540–790 AD)

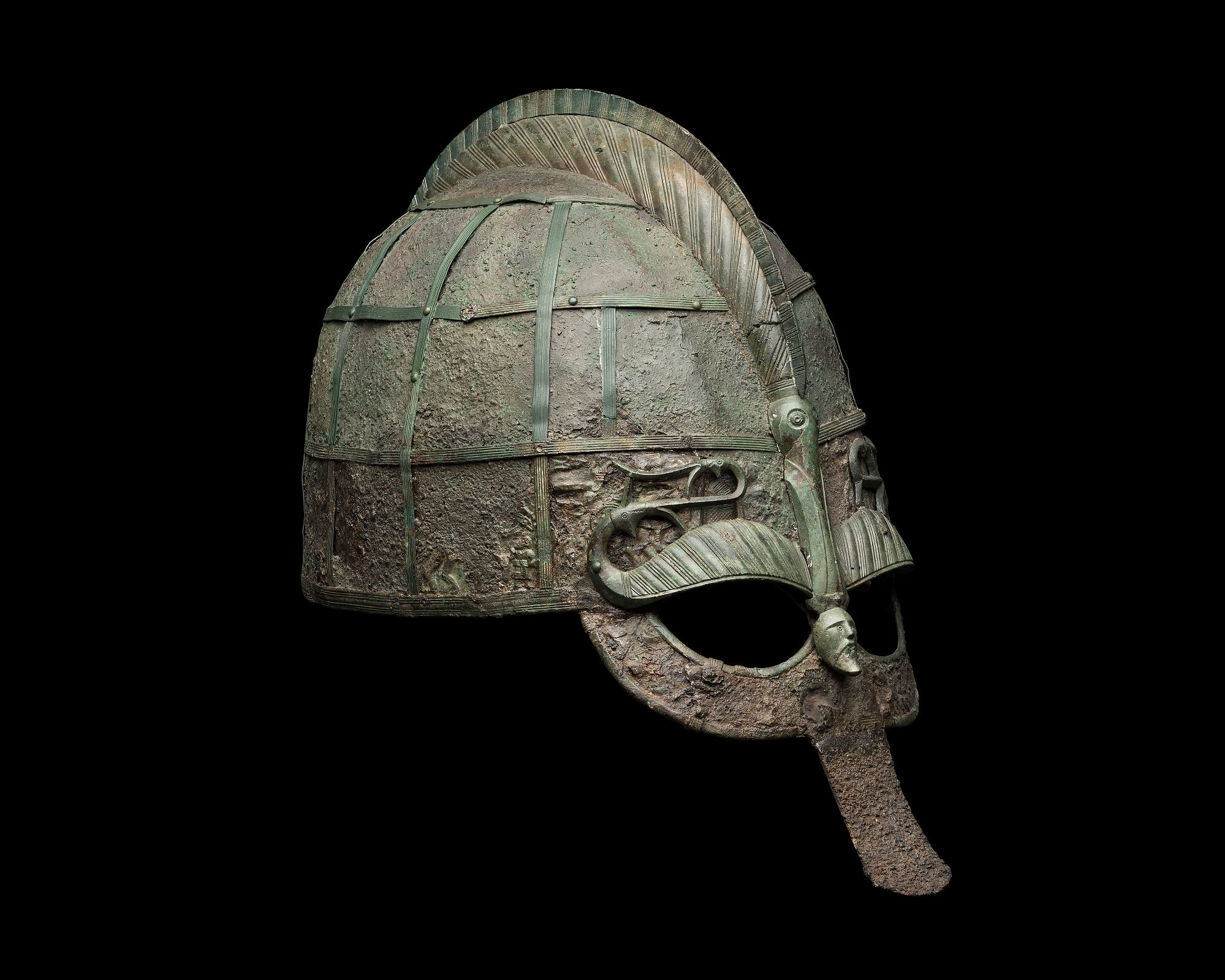
The Vendel I helmet, at the Swedish History Museum

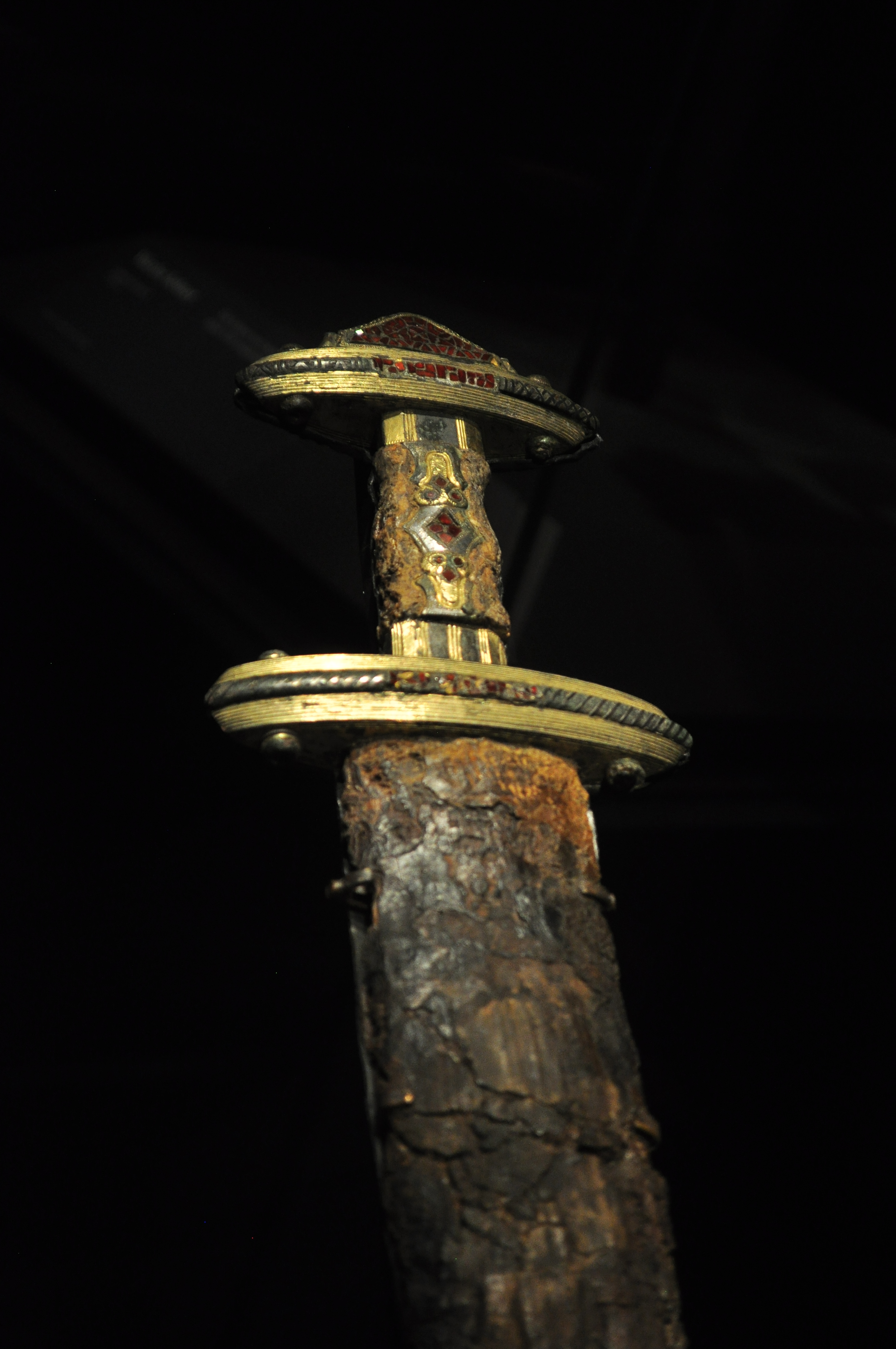
Vendel era sword from Valsgärde

In Scandinavian prehistory, sometimes specifically Swedish prehistory, the Vendel Period, or Vendel Age (Swedish: Vendeltiden), appears between the Migration Period and the Viking Age (c. 550–800 AD), specifically following the Volcanic winter of 536, subsiding around 550 AD. The name is taken from the rich boat inhumation cemetery at Vendel parish church, Uppland. Unlike the preceding and succeeding eras, the Vendel Period left very few precious metal artifacts or runic inscriptions. Instead, it is extremely rich in animal art on copper-alloy objects. It is also known for guldgubbar, tiny embossed gold foil images, and elaborate helmets with embossed decoration similar to the one found at Sutton Hoo in England.

During the period, Swedish expeditions began to explore the waterways of territories which later became Russia, Ukraine, and Belarus. The Elder Futhark writing system was abandoned in favor of the Younger Futhark, virtually simultaneously over the whole of Scandinavia. Some runestones survive, most notably those at Rök and Sparlösa, both from c. 800. Other written sources are few and hard to interpret: a few Icelandic sagas, the tale of Beowulf, and accounts from some southern European writers. Earlier Swedish historians tried to make use of these to create a coherent history, but this effort has largely been abandoned, and the period is now mostly studied by archaeologists.

Other names for the corresponding period in the Balto-Scandinavian area includes:

- Denmark
–
"Younger Germanic Iron Age"
(Danish: yngre germansk jernalder)
- Norway
–
"Merovingian Period"
(Norwegian: merovingertiden, Nynorsk: merovingartida)
- Finland
–
"Merovingian Period"
(Finnish: merovingiaika)
- Estonia
–
"Pre-Viking Age"
(Estonian: eelviikingiaeg)
- Latvia
–
"Middle Iron Age"
(Latvian: vidējais dzelzs laikmets)
- Lithuania
–
"Middle Iron Age"
(Lithuanian: vidurinįjį geležies amžių)

Generic names for the period also includes the "Late Migration Period" or "Latter Migration Period" broadly.

== Background ==
The Germanic Iron Age is divided into the Early Germanic Iron Age (EGIA) and the Late Germanic Iron Age (LGIA). It is particularly for Sweden that the late Germanic iron age spanning between 550 and 800 is called the Vendel era. In Norway it is more common to refer to the period as the Merovingian Age, while the Danish refer to it as the Younger Germanic Iron Age.

The late Germanic Iron Age begins with the fall of the Western Roman Empire and the rise of the Gothic kingdoms in Europe, later replaced by the Franks, the Lombards and the Avar Khaganate. After the Western Roman Empire fell, gold became scarce and Scandinavians began to make objects of gilded bronze, with decorative figures of interlacing animals. During the early Germanic Iron Age, decorations tended to be representational; the animal figures were drawn in more basic forms. In the later Germanic Iron Age, artistic styles became more abstract, symbolic, and intricate, including figures with interlaced shapes and limbs.

The upheaval in Europe appears to have lessened somewhat due to the gradual cessation of the Gothic Wars. Emperor Justinian's Eternal Peace (532) with the Shahanshah Khosrau I of Iran as well as the Byzantine reconquest of the Italian peninsula with the capitulation of the Goths south of the Po river (555), the completion of the Byzantine reconquest (562) may be seen in context of what has been described as the Vendel period. The Merovingians have united the Gaulish Romans and the Belgae. The Franks establishing the Merovingan dynasty as "Kings of the Franks" (since 509).

In Uppland, in what today is the east-central part of Sweden, Old Uppsala was probably the centre of religious and political life. It had both a well-known sacred grove and great Royal Mounds.

== Burial customs ==
Several areas with rich burial gifts, indicative of high status or royalty, have been found, including well-preserved boat inhumation graves at Vendel and Valsgärde, and tumuli at Gamla Uppsala. These were used for several generations.

Some of the riches were probably acquired through the control of mining districts and the production of iron. The rulers had troops of mounted elite warriors with costly armour. Grave goods of these mounted warriors include stirrups and saddle ornaments of birds of prey in gilded bronze with encrusted garnets.

Chess pieces made of ivory in the Roman style are located in the western grave. Three Middle Eastern cameos and buttons made of gold have also been found, together with Frankish clothes made of gold thread.

Games were popular, as is shown in finds of tafl games, including pawns and dice.

The Sutton Hoo helmet closely resembles helmets found in Gamla Uppsala, Vendel and Valsgärde, sharing elements such as boar imagery and pressblech foil decoration, showing that the Anglo-Saxon elite had extensive contacts with the Swedish elite.

== Written sources ==
Mounted elite warriors are mentioned in the work of the 6th century Goth scholar Jordanes, who wrote that the Swedes had the best horses beside the Thuringians. They also echo much later in the sagas, where king Adils is always described as fighting on horseback (both against Áli and Hrólf Kraki). Snorri Sturluson wrote that Adils had the best horses of his days. The epic of Beowulf also describes legendary tales about the Swedish Vendel times, including great wars called the Swedish-Geatish wars between the Swedish house of Scylfling and the Geatish house of Wulfling.

That some Swedish legendary royals of them could be historical is supported by possibly independent references to them in Beowulf and Norse sagas. Geats could have been a part of the Anglo-Saxon settlement of Britain. They probably did not have any major role but could have been described by English sources as Jutes. The Wulfling dynasty in Geatland might be related to the house of Wuffingas.

== See also ==
- Archaeology of Northern Europe
- Battle on the Ice of Lake Vänern
- Ship burial
- Stone ship

== Sources ==
- Jesch, Judith (ed.) (2012). The Scandinavians from the Vendel Period to the Tenth Century: An Ethnographic Perspective, Boydell Press, 2012. ISBN 9781843837282
- Harrison, Dick. Sveriges historia: 600–1350. Norstedts. Stockholm: 2009. ISBN 9789113023779
- Hyenstrand, Åke. Lejonet, draken och korset. Sverige 500–1000 [The Lion, the Dragon, and the Cross. Sweden 500–1000]. Enskede: TBP, 2002.
