= Battle on the Ice of Lake Vänern =

6th-century battle on the frozen Vänern

The Battle on the Ice of Lake Vänern was a 6th-century battle recorded in the Norse sagas and referred to in the Old English epic Beowulf. It has been dated to c. AD 530.

== The epic Beowulf ==
Beowulf is an epic poem that refers to the conflict, but not to a battle on Lake Vänern. In Beowulf, the Swedish king Ohthere (Ottar Vendelkråka, who is often called the first historical king of Sweden) had died and his brother Onela (Áli) had usurped the Swedish throne. Ottar's sons Eanmund and Eadgils (Adils) had to flee to Geatland and seek refuge with the Geatish king Heardred. This induced Onela to attack the Geats and kill both Eanmund and Heardred. In order to avenge his king and kinsman, Beowulf decided to help Eadgils gain the throne of Sweden. During the battle Eadgils slew Onela and became the king of Sweden.

== Norse sagas ==
There are a few references in Norse sources that give an account of the battle on the ice of Lake Vänern. Some of the sagas differ from one another in detail. The equivalent of Onela, Áli hinn upplenzki, has been placed in the Norwegian Uplands, rather than Swedish Uppland.

In Snorri Sturluson's Prose Edda, in the Skáldskaparmál, the battle is mentioned in two verses. In the first account, Snorri cites a fragmentary poem called Kálfsvísa:

Vésteinn Vali, en Vífill Stúfi, Meinþjófr Mói, en Morginn Vakri, Áli Hrafni, er til íss riðu, en annarr austr und Aðilsi grár hvarfaði, geiri undaðr.	Vésteinn rode Valr, And Vifill rode Stúfr; Meinthjófr rode Mór, And Morginn on Vakr ("Watchful, Nimble, Ambling, or perhaps Hawk"); Áli rode Hrafn, They who rode onto the ice: But another, southward, Under Adils, A gray one, wandered, Wounded with the spear.

In the second account, Snorri relates: "They decided to fight on the ice of the water which is called Vänern...In this fight king Áli died and a great many of his people. Then king Adils took from him his helmet Hildisvín [battle-boar] and his horse Hrafn."

In the Ynglinga saga, Snorri relates that King Adils (Eadgils) fought hard battles with the Norwegian king who was called Áli hin upplenzki. They fought on the ice of Lake Vänern, where Áli fell and Adils won. Snorri relates that much is told about this event in the saga of the Sköldungs, and that Adils took Hrafn (Raven), Áli's horse.

The Skjöldunga saga is lost but at the end of the 16th century, Arngrímur Jónsson saved a piece of information from this saga in Latin. He wrote: "There was animosity between king Adils of Sweden and the Norwegian king Áli of Uppland. They decided to fight on the ice of Lake Vänern. Adils won and took his helmet, chainmail and horse."

Adils would become a famous king of whom much is told in the legends of Hrólf Kraki and in the Danish Gesta Danorum. According to Snorri, he is buried in Old Uppsala.

== Archaeology ==
The accounts of the Battle on the Ice contain accurate information about this time and the Swedish Vendel Age. This period was characterized by the appearance of mounted warriors who fought on horseback and by the use of boar-crested helmets.

In the Battle on the Ice, the combatants are described as fighting on horseback, although the later Norsemen and Anglo-Saxons who told of this battle in their legends would fight on foot. Likewise, Onela's helmet is called the battle-boar although the boar-crested helmets were long out of use by the time records of the event were written down. Many instances of boar-crested helmets have been found in extant examples, notably in the burial mounds of Vendel, Valsgärde and Uppsala.
