= Beowulf (hero) =

Legendary Geatish hero

Beowulf Bēowulf
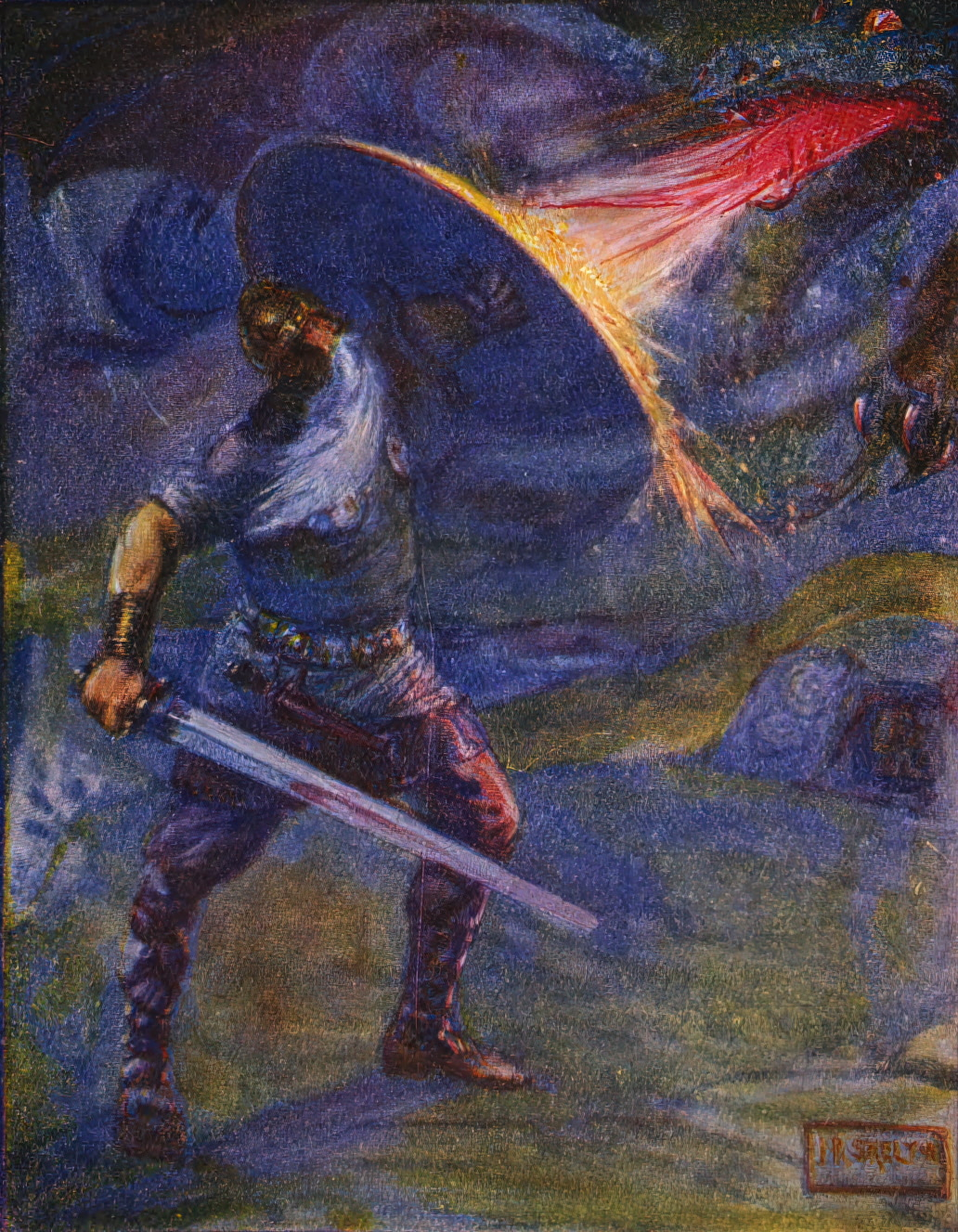
- Beowulf battles the dragon

In-universe information
- Gender: Male
- Family: Ecgtheow (father), Hrethel (maternal grandfather), Hygelac (maternal uncle, fl. 515)
- Nationality: Geatish

Beowulf (/ˈbeɪəwʊlf/; Old English: Bēowulf [ˈbeːowuɫf]) is a legendary Geatish hero in the eponymous epic poem, one of the oldest surviving pieces of English literature.

== Etymology and origins of the character ==
A number of origins have been proposed for the name Beowulf.

=== Bee-wolf ===
Henry Sweet, a philologist and linguist specializing in Germanic languages, proposed that the name Bēowulf literally means in Old English "bee-wolf" or "bee-hunter" and that it is a kenning for "bear". Other recorded instances of the name have also been explained with this etymology. The 1031 AD Liber Vitae records the name Biuuuwulf as belonging to a monk from Durham, and this has also been explained as meaning bee-wolf in the Old Northumbrian dialect. The 11th century English Domesday Book contains a recorded instance of the name Beulf.

=== Biewolf ===
English philologist Walter William Skeat proposed an etymological origin in a term for "Woodpecker" citing the Old Dutch term biewolf for the bird. Skeat states that the black woodpecker is common in Norway and Sweden and further reasons that the "indominatable nature" and that the "bird fights to the death" might have influenced the choice of the name. This etymological origin has been criticized as not being in accordance to Grimm's law and Skeat may have recanted the proposal at a later date.

=== Beado-Wulf (war wolf) and related ===
The editors of Bosworth's dictionary of Old English propose that Beowulf is a variant of beado-wulf meaning "war wolf" and that it is cognate with the Icelandic Bodulfr which also means "war wolf". The 19th-century scholar scholar Gregor Sarrazin suggested that the name Beowulf derived from a mistranslation of Böðvarr with -varr interpreted as vargr meaning "wolf". Sophus Bugge questioned this etymology, and instead suggested that the personage Böðvarr Bjarki derived from Beowulf.

=== Beowulf before Beowulf ===
Frederick Klaeber, the poem's first modern editor, saw Beowulf unproblematically as a continuation of the mythological character Beow, a god associated with harvest and agriculture. Beow "typifies the introduction of agriculture and civilization", and Beowulf, "that is, primarily Beow", is to be seen in this light: the fight with Grendel thematizes the annual struggle against the sea in the spring, and the fight with the dragon "is its autumnal counterpart". The hero's death signifies winter.

Other (mythological) explanations abound. Leonard Neidorf has argued that Beowulf was present in (now lost) heroic-legendary cycles before Beowulf was composed. Neidorf argued that the seventh-century usage of the name ‘Biuuulf’ (Beowulf), which involves an element (Beow) that was unproductive in contemporary name-giving, suggests that legends of Beowulf existed well before the composition of our extant poem.

== Character history in the Beowulf manuscript ==
=== Origins in Geatland ===
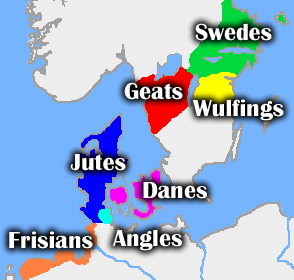
Tribes mentioned in the epic poem Beowulf

Beowulf belongs to the people of the Wederas (l. 225, or "Weather-Geats"), a a clan of the Geats. In the epic, Hrothgar provides biographical background: when he is told Beowulf has come to help him, he explains that Beowulf was the son of Ecgþeow, a warrior we later learn was of the Swedish Wægmundings. Ecgþeow had slain Heaðolaf, a man from a clan named the Wulfings. Beowulf's own people couldn't harbor him anymore and so Ecgþeow was banished and had to seek refuge among the Danes. The Danish king Hroðgar paid the weregild, he says, and claims Ecgþeow swore him oaths.

Ecgþeow was in the service of the Geatish king Hreðel, whose daughter he married. They had Beowulf, who grew up with the Geats. In his youth, Beowulf knew Breca the Bronding and engaged him in a swimming or rowing contest whose outcome is unclear. In the second half of the poem, after he returns to Geatland, the poet comments that Beowulf was considered slothful or even cowardly as a youth (ll. 2183-88).

=== Zealand and Grendel ===
When King Hroðgar, his wife Wealhþeow, and his court were terrorized by the monstrous Grendel, Beowulf left Geatland (West Götaland) and sailed to Zealand with fourteen warriors in order to pay his father's debt. During the night, Grendel arrived to attack the sleeping men and devoured one of the other Geats before seizing Beowulf. As no manmade weapon could harm Grendel, Beowulf fought back with his bare hands and tore off the beast's arm. Grendel fled back to the bog to die from his wound, and his arm was attached to the wall of Heorot. The next day, Beowulf was lauded and a skald (scop) sang and compared Beowulf with the hero Sigmund.

However, during the following night Grendel's mother arrived to avenge her son's death and collect weregild. As Beowulf slept in a different building he could not stop her. He resolved to descend into the bog in order to kill her. They fought beside Grendel's corpse, and Beowulf finally won with the aid of an enchanted giant sword stolen from the lair's plundered wooden box.

=== Return to Geatland, kingdom, and death ===
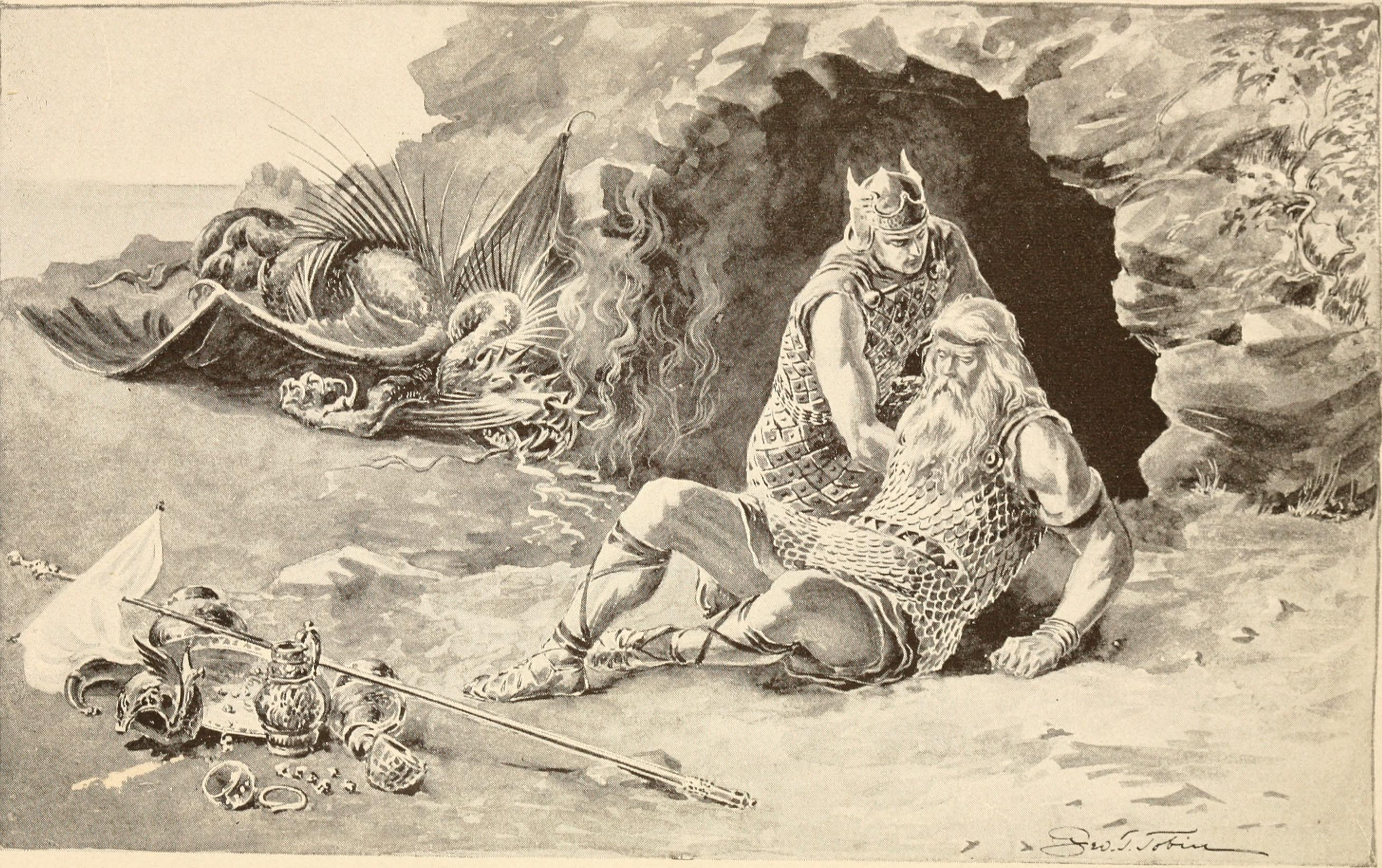
Illustration of the death of Beowulf

Having returned to Geatland, Beowulf is described as taking part in a raid (a genuine historic event) against the Franks with his king Hygelac. Hygelac died during the raid, and Beowulf swam home in full armour. Back in Geatland, queen Hygd offered Beowulf the throne but Beowulf declined in favour of the young prince Heardred. However, Heardred received two Swedish princes, Eadgils and Eanmund who had fled their uncle Onela who had usurped the Swedish throne. This led to a Swedish invasion in which Heardred was killed. Beowulf was proclaimed king (by Onela) and decided to avenge Heardred and to help Eadgils become king of Sweden.

The event when Onela was slain was probably a historic event. Even though it is only briefly mentioned in Beowulf, it occurs extensively in several Scandinavian sources where it is called the Battle on the Ice of Lake Vänern. For example, Snorri Sturluson wrote:

Onela rode Raven, as they rode to the ice, but a second one, a grey one, hastened, wounded by spears, eastwards under Eadgils. [...] In this fight Onela died and a great many of his people. Then king Eadgils took from him his helmet Battle-boar and his horse Raven.

Beowulf ruled the Geats for 50 years, until his realm was terrorized by a fire-breathing dragon after a thief stole a golden cup from its hoard of treasure. Beowulf pursues the monster into its lair at Hronessnæs, but only his young Swedish relative Wiglaf dared join him. Beowulf's sword broke, but after Wiglaf wounds the dragon and the flames are quenched, Beowulf kills the dragon with his dagger. He had been mortally wounded by the dragon's poisonous bite. Dying, he was carried out by Wiglaf, and with his last breaths named Wiglaf his heir. His body was burned on a funeral pyre, and his ashes buried in a barrow by the sea.

The last three lines of the poem are, in Seamus Heaney's translation:

They [the Geats] said that of all the kings upon the earth,
he was the man most gracious and fair-minded,
kindest to his people and keenest to win fame.

The statement is clear, except for the final word, lof-geornest ('keenest to seek fame'), which is two-edged. It is no shame for a hero to seek fame, but it may be possible to be too eager for it.

Legendary titles
Preceded by Heardred	King of the Geats	Succeeded by Wiglaf
