= Kálfsvísa =

The Kálfsvísa ("Kálfr's vísa", Kálfr being maybe the name of its author) is a poem partially preserved in Snorri Sturluson’s Skáldskaparmál.

Its three stanzas in fornyrðislag mostly consist of a þula of horses and their riders, Germanic heroes (for instance Grani and Sigurðr). The Kálfsvísa also includes a narrative dealing with the Battle on the Ice of Lake Vänern between Áli and Aðils.

262.
Dagr reið Drösli,
en Dvalinn Móðni,
Hjalmr Háfeta,
en Haki Fáki,
reið bani Belja
Blóðughófa,
en Skævaði
skati Haddingja.
263.
Vésteinn Vali,
en Vífill Stúfi,
Meinþjófr Mói,
en Morginn Vakri,
Áli Hrafni,
er til íss riðu,
en annarr austr
und Aðilsi
grár hvarfaði,
geiri undaðr.
264.
Björn reið Blakki,
en Bjárr Kerti,
Atli Glaumi,
en Aðils Slöngvi,
Högni Hölkvi,
en Haraldr Fölkvi,
Gunnarr Gota,
en Grana Sigurð.

Dagr rode Drösull ("Roamer"),
And Dvalinn rode Móðnir ("Spirited");
Hjálmr Háfeti ("High-Stepper");
Haki rode Fákr;
The Slayer of Beli (Freyr)
Rode Blóðughófi ("Bloody Hoof")
And Skævaðr ("Fast One") was ridden
By the Ruler of Haddings (Helgi).

Vésteinn rode Valr ("Falcon"),
And Vífill rode Stúfr ("Small One");
Meinþjófr rode Mór ("Peat"),
And Morginn on Vakr ("Watchful, Nimble, Ambling, or perhaps Hawk");
Áli rode Hrafn ("Raven"),
They who rode onto the ice:
But another, eastward,
Under Aðils,
A gray one, wandered,
Wounded with the spear.

Björn rode Blakkr ("Black"),
And Bjárr rode Körtr ("Vigorous, Brave");
Atli rode Glaumr ("Merriment"),
And Aðils on Slöngvir ("Slinger");
Högni on Hölkvir,
And Haraldr on Fölkvir ("Pale");
Gunnarr rode Goti ("Goth"),
And Sigurðr Grani ("Muzzle").
