= Small nucleolar RNA SNORD35 =

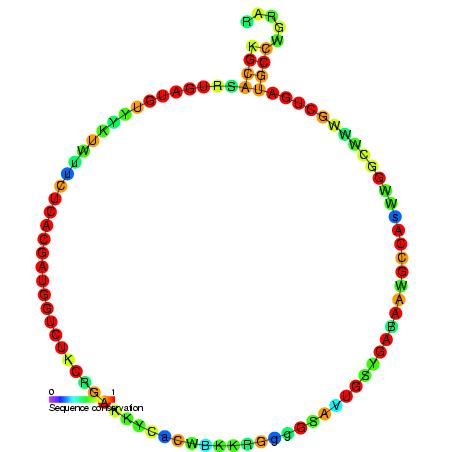
- Predicted secondary structure and sequence conservation of SNORD35

Identifiers
- Symbol: SNORD35
- Alt. Symbols: U35
- Rfam: RF00211

Other data
- RNA type: Gene; snRNA; snoRNA; C/D-box
- Domain: Eukaryota
- GO: GO:0006396 GO:0005730
- SO: SO:0000593
- PDB structures: PDBe

In molecular biology, snoRNA U35 (also known as SNORD35) is a non-coding RNA (ncRNA) molecule which functions in the modification of other small nuclear RNAs (snRNAs). This type of modifying RNA is usually located in the nucleolus of the eukaryotic cell which is a major site of snRNA biogenesis. It is known as a small nucleolar RNA (snoRNA) and also often referred to as a guide RNA.

snoRNA U35 belongs to the C/D box class of snoRNAs which contain the conserved sequence motifs known as the C box (UGAUGA) and the D box (CUGA). Most of the members of the box C/D family function in directing site-specific 2'-O-methylation of substrate RNAs.

U35 is encoded in intron 6 of ribosomal protein L13A and intron 3 of ribosomal protein S11 in humans and at homologous positions in mouse and chicken ribosomal protein genes. U35 is predicted to guide the 2'O-ribose methylation of 28S ribosomal RNA (rRNA) residue C4506.
