= German submarine U-35 =

U-35 may refer to one of the following German submarines:

- SM U-35, was a Type U 31 submarine launched in 1914 and that served in the First World War until surrendered on 26 November 1918
  - During the First World War, Germany also had these submarines with similar names:
    - SM UB-35, a Type UB II submarine launched in 1915 and sunk on 26 January 1918
    - SM UC-35, a Type UC II submarine launched in 1916 and scuttled on 17 May 1918
- German submarine U-35 (1936), a Type VIIA submarine that served in the Second World War until scuttled on 29 November 1939
- German submarine U-35 (S185), a Type 212 submarine of the German Navy commissioned into service in March 2015.
