= Valsgärde =

Farm and burial site

Coordinates: 59°55.565′N 17°37.58′E

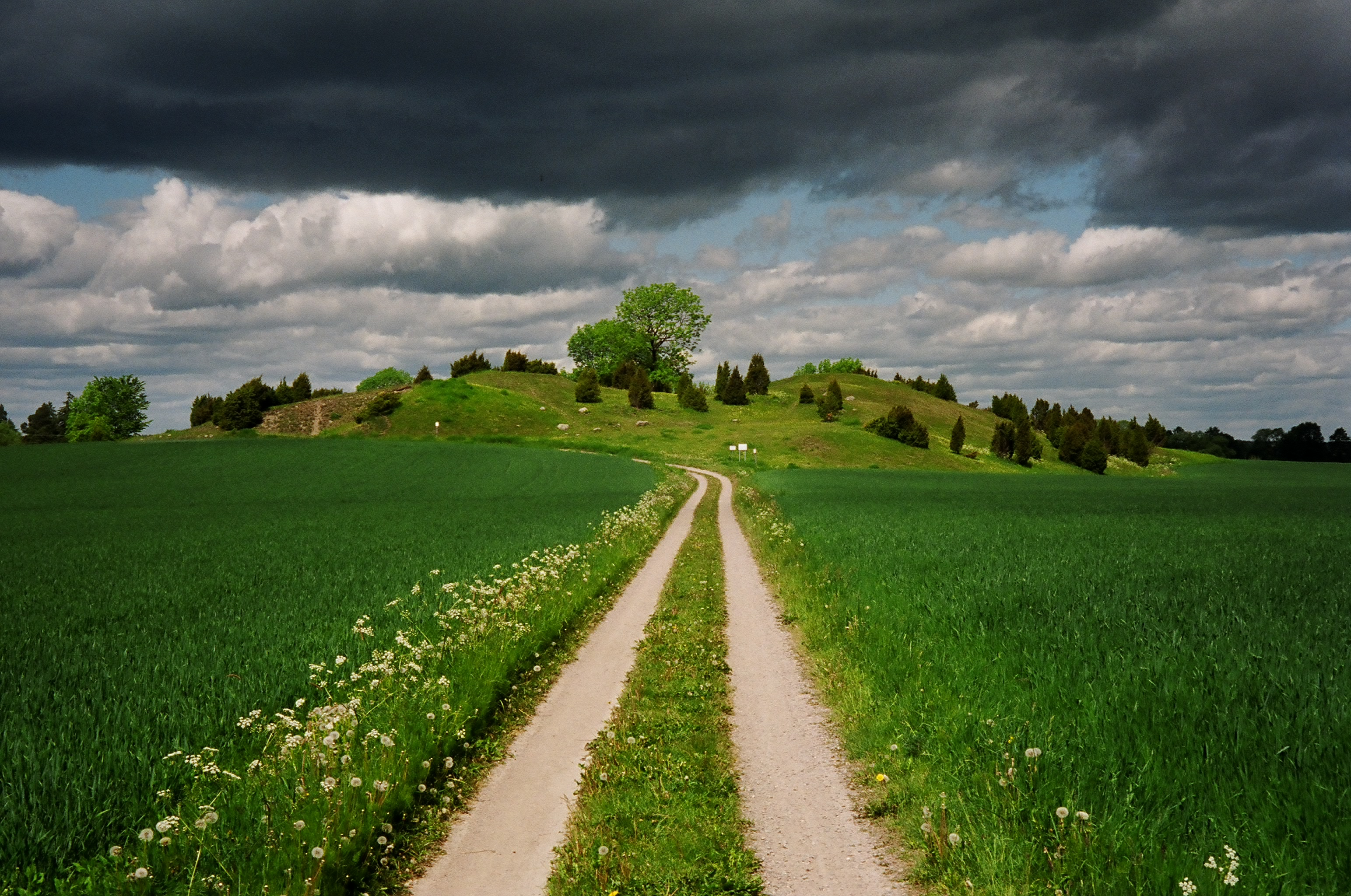
Landscape of the Valsgärde grave field.

Valsgärde or Vallsgärde is a farm on the Fyris river, about three kilometres north of Gamla Uppsala, the ancient centre of the Swedish kings and of the pagan faith in Sweden. The present farm dates from the 16th century. The farm's notability derives from the presence of a burial site, which was used for more than 300 years during the Swedish Vendel Age and the Viking Age. The first ship burial is from the 6th century and the last graves are from the 11th century.

== Excavation ==
The site was found and excavated by archaeologists in the 1920s, and before this similar graves had only been found at Vendel, which gave its name to this period of the Scandinavian Iron Age. The graves are princely, and are almost identical to ones found in England, at Sutton Hoo in East Anglia dated probably to 610–635. There are several theories about the identities of those buried, ranging from the Ynglings (Scylfings) to powerful warriors within the Leidang system, or local strongmen who had enriched themselves through trade due to the area's strategic position between the fjord of Mälaren and the important region of Tiundaland. There are so many rich graves that it is likely that most of them were royalty.

Today, the artifacts recovered from the site are preserved in the collections of Uppsala University and are on display at Museum Gustavianum in Uppsala.

Model of Valsgärde boat grave.

Swedish warrior artifacts and equipment from the Vendel Period, discovered in boat graves at the Valsgärde archaeological site.

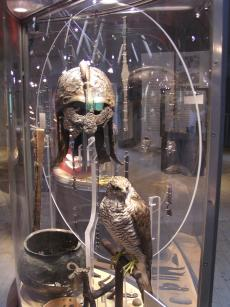
The oval outline behind the helmet shows the probable size of the shield.

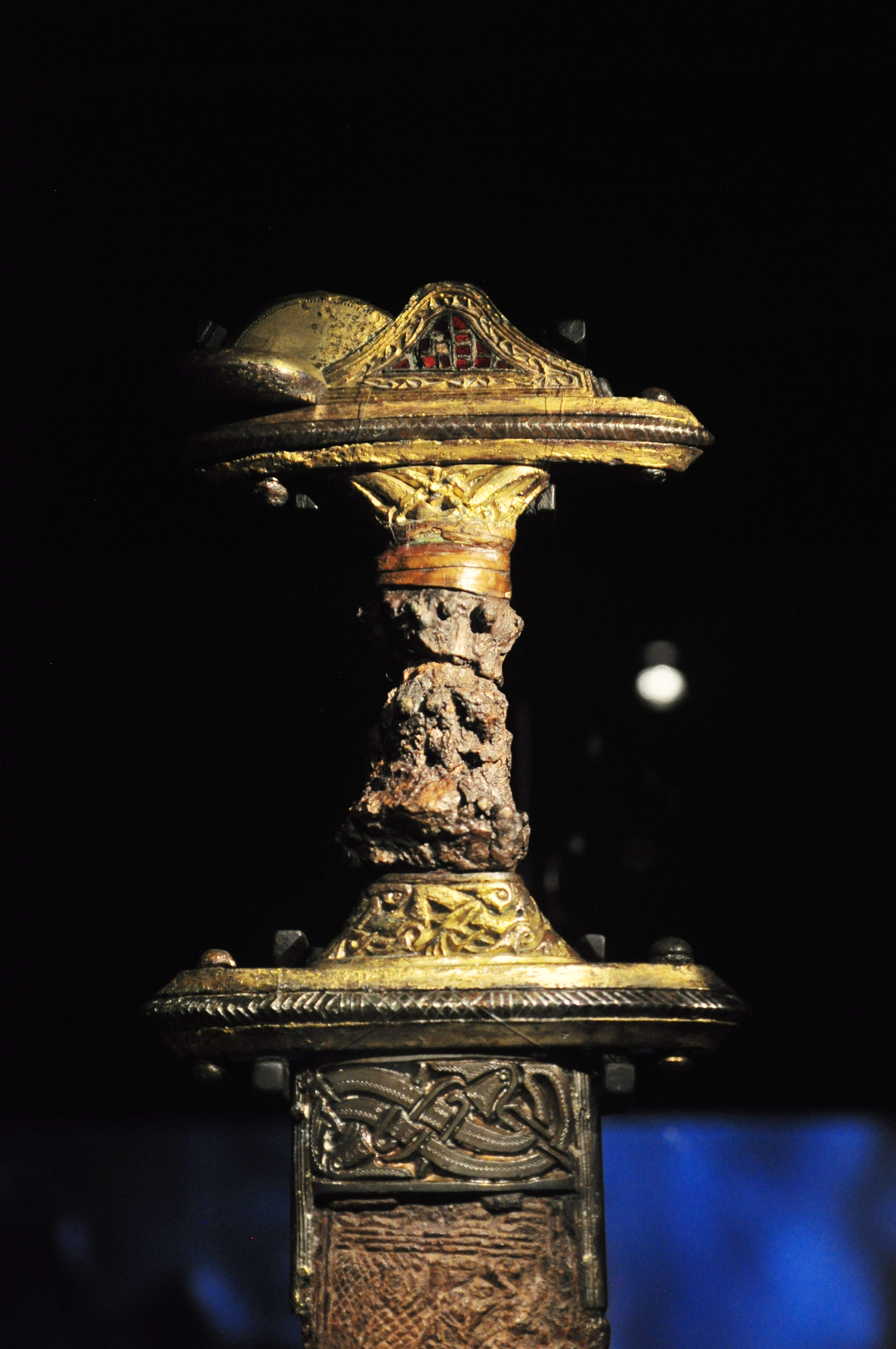
The Vikings Begin 55 - warrior sword, 7th century
