= Uppland Runic Inscription 35 =

Memorial runestone in Sweden

Coordinates: 59°21′48″N 17°43′59″E

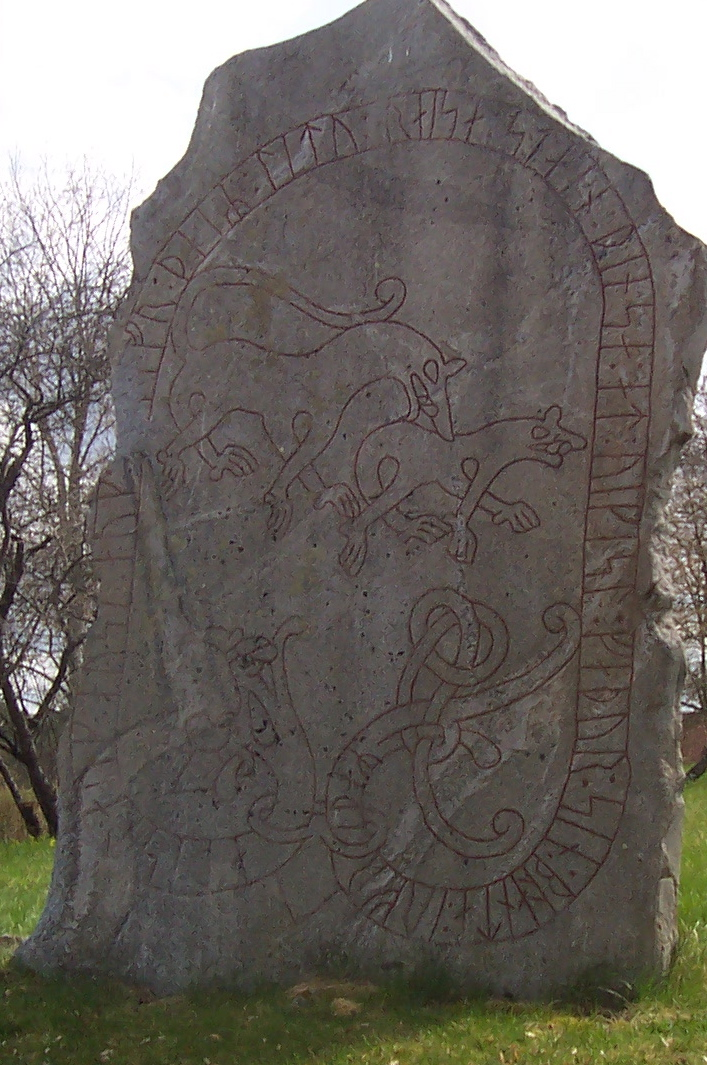
- Created: eleventh century
- Discovered: Svartsjö, Uppland, Sweden
- Rundata ID: U 35
- Runemaster: Unknown

Text – Native
- Old Norse : Aðisl ok As[l]/Ǫs[l] ok [Ola]fʀ þæiʀ letu ræisa stæin þennsa at Vigisl, faður sinn, boanda Ærnfriðaʀ.

Translation
- Adils and Ösel(?) and Olov(?) they let raise this stone after Vigisl, their father, husband of Ärnfrids.

This memorial runestone, listed as U 35 under Rundata, is located in Svartsjö, Uppland, Sweden, and dates from the Viking Age.

== Description ==
The inscription on this granite runestone, which is three meters in height, has two fanged beasts surrounded by a runic serpent text band. The name of the runemaster is unknown, and the stone is classified as being in runestone style Pr2, which is also known as the Ringerike style.

The name Adils or Aðísl from the runic text appears to have been a rather rare name, during both the Viking Age and the Middle Ages. It does not appear in any other Swedish runic inscription. The name does appear in Ynglingatal, Norse sagas, and Beowulf as belonging to a Swedish king during the sixth century named Eadgils. It also appears on one of the Manx Runestones, Kirk Michael MM 130.

The runic text states that the stone is a memorial by three sons to their father Vigisl, who is described as being the husband of Ärnfrids. By referring to her in this manner, the text is probably indicating that she was also deceased when the stone was raised.

== Inscription ==
A transliteration of the runic text into Latin letters is:

aþisl : auk : ays- : auk : ---fr : þaiʀ : litu : raisa : stain : þinsa : at : uikisl : faþur : sin : boanta : irfriþaʀ

== Photographs ==
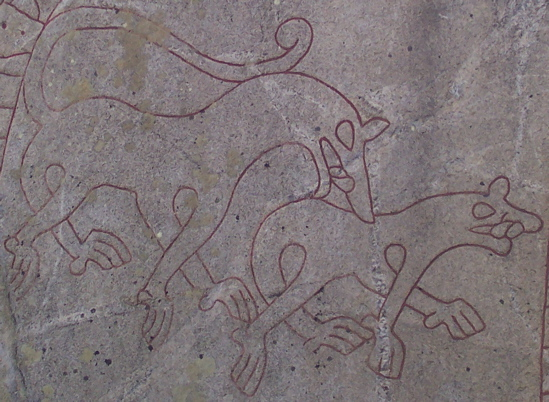
Runestone detail.

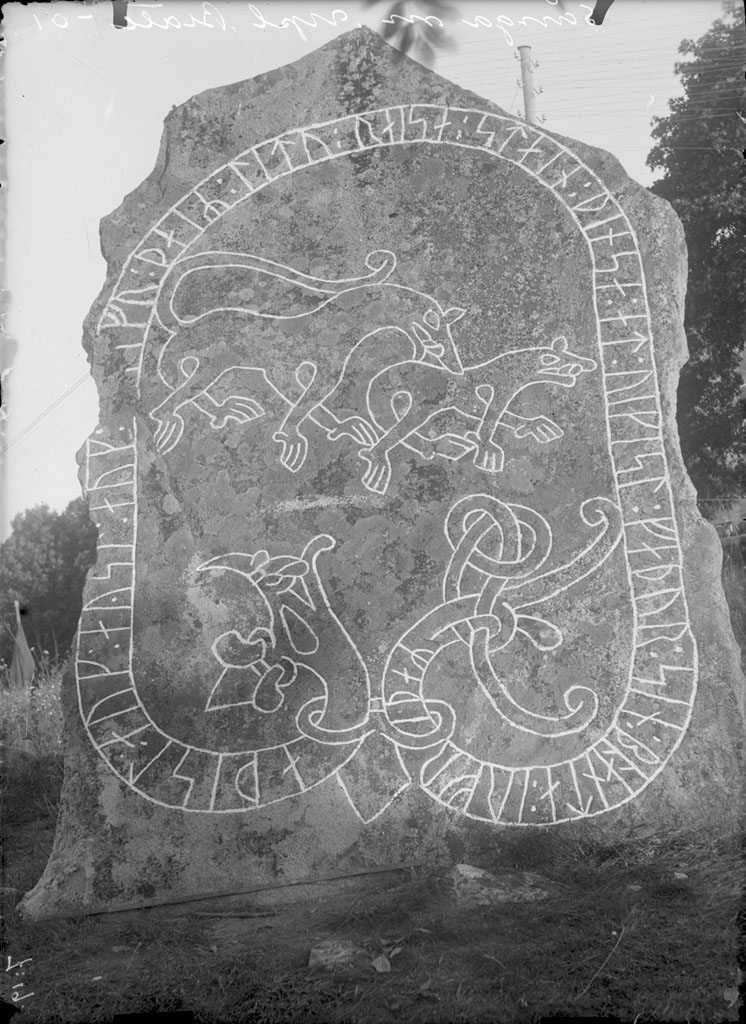
The runestone in 1910.

== See also ==
- List of runestones
