= Vendel =

Parish in the Swedish province of Uppland

Coordinates: 60°09′47″N 17°36′06″E

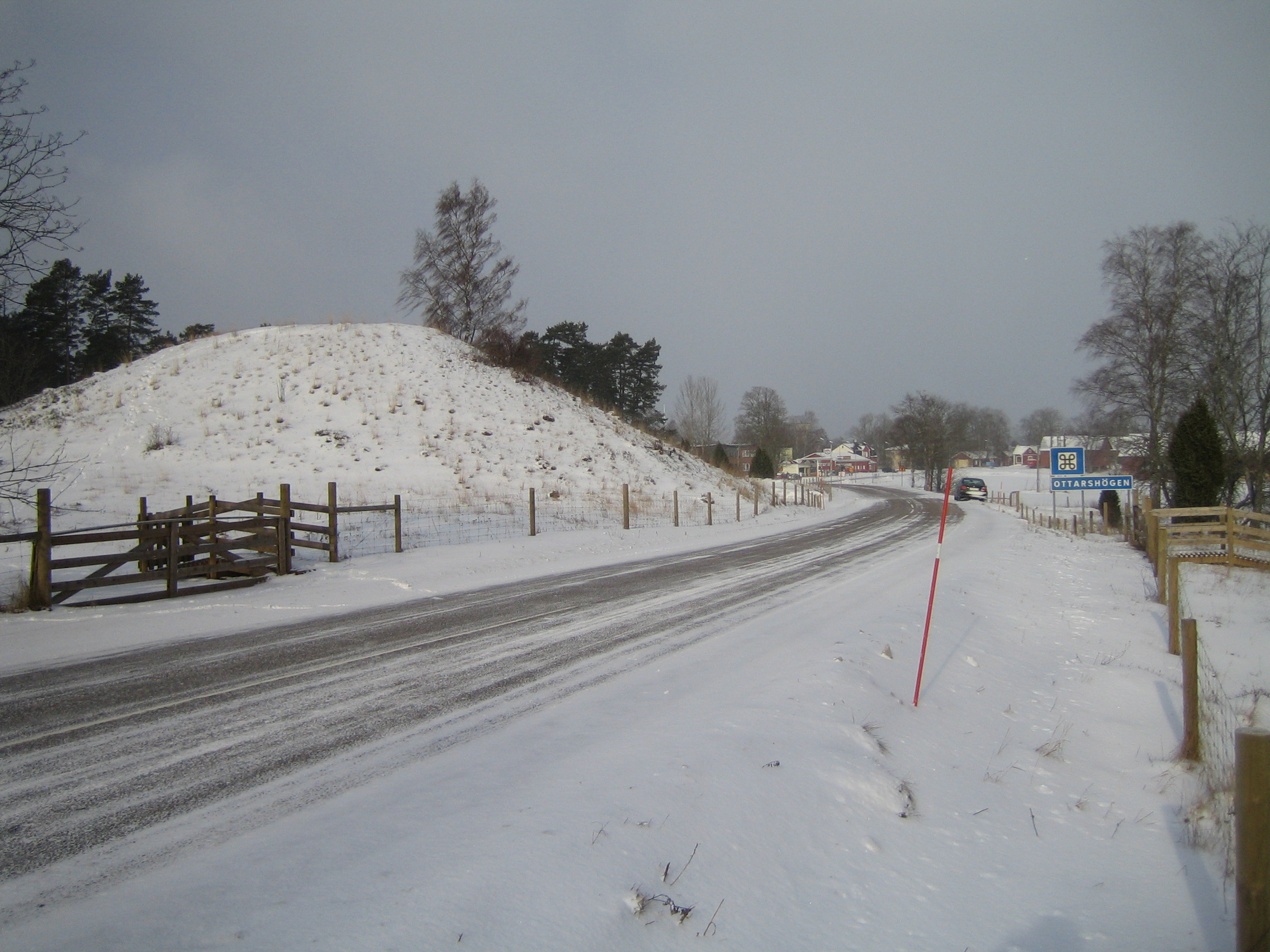
Ottarshögen in Vendel

Vendel is a village at Tierp Municipality in Uppland, Sweden. The village overlooks Vendelsjön, a long inland stretch of water near the Vendel river which has its confluence with the river Fyris. Vendel was the site of an ancient royal estate, part of Uppsala öd, a network of royal estates meant to provide income for the medieval Swedish kings. A large number of archaeological finds have been found here, which have given their name to the Vendel Period.

Vendel Church (Vendels kyrka) was probably begun to be built in Romanesque style during the latter half of the 13th century. Around 1450, the church was vaulted with brick vaults. The church is most noted for its murals by Johannes Iwan who worked in Uppland during the 15th century.

== Archaeological research ==
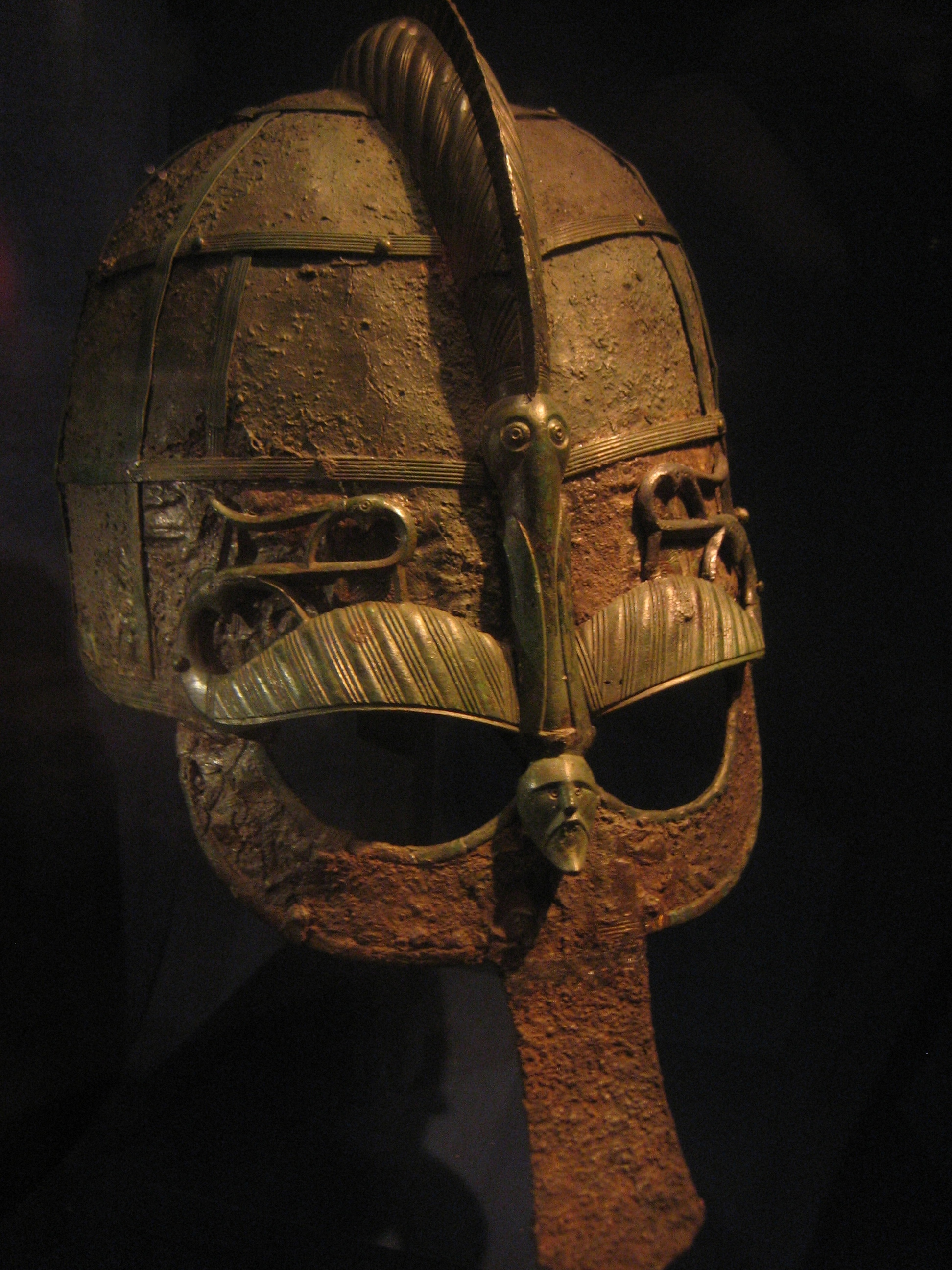
Helmet from a 7th-century ship burial, Vendel

In 1881 to 1883, several excavations by Swedish archaeologist Hjalmar Stolpe (1841–1905) revealed 14 graves in and just beyond the south-east corner of the churchyard. Several of the burials were contained in boats up to 9 m long, and they were richly furnished with arrangements of weapons (including fine swords), helmets, cauldrons and chains, beads, shields, tools etc.

The helmets from Graves 1, 12 and 14 bear close comparison to the helmet from the early 7th century ship-burial at Sutton Hoo, Suffolk, England, with die-stamped plaques depicting scenes of warriors. The shield from Grave 12 at Vendel is also very comparable to the Sutton Hoo shield, and has a stamped metal strip mount which is actually die-linked to an equivalent piece at Sutton Hoo. The Vendel boats were identified by the presence of many ship-rivets, and accompanied by many animal sacrifices (mainly horses) within the burials. A later grave (Grave 3) contained an important set of bridle-mounts for a horse. These graves date between the later 6th to 8th centuries.

At Husby near Vendel there is a large mound which local tradition calls Ottarshögen from Ottar also known as Ohthere and hög, meaning mound or barrow. Ohthere is associated with the person of that same name in the epic Beowulf. An excavation in 1917 revealed the remains of a powerful man who was buried at the beginning of the 6th century, the time of Ohthere. Other graves of similar date, associated with Ohthere's family, are at Old Uppsala.

Vendel has given its name to a period (the Vendel Age) in the Scandinavian Iron Age, and to the corresponding Vendel style in art. It has often been suggested that the Germanic Vandals, or at least their kings or rulers, were connected to the site. In this it is coupled with the name of a companion site at Valsgärde in the same region. The close comparisons with the 27-metre ship burial at Sutton Hoo show a direct connection between the armourers producing work found at the two sites, a connection central to the understanding of both. The Sutton Hoo burial is often associated with King Rædwald of East Anglia, (ruled c 599-624), who in his later reign (c 616-624) was most powerful among the rulers of the English kingdoms.

== See also ==
- Valsgärde

== Other sources ==
- Judith Jesch (2012) The Scandinavians from the Vendel Period to the Tenth Century: An Ethnographic Perspective (Boydell & Brewer, Limited) ISBN 9781843837282

== Related reading ==
- Ture Arne: "Vendel före vendeltiden" (Fornvännen 27, 1932, s. 1-22)
- Sune Lindqvist: "Sköld och svärd ur Vendel I" (Fornvännen, 1950, s. 265-280)
- Nils Åberg: "Vendelgravarna och Uppsala högar i deras historiska miljö" (Fornvännen 44; 1949; s. 193-204)
