= Onela =

Semi-legendary Swedish king

Hrólf Kraki Tradition

Hrólf Kraki's saga
Ynglinga saga
Lejre Chronicle
Gesta Danorum
Beowulf
People
Hrólfr Kraki
Halfdan
Helgi
Yrsa
Adils
Áli
Bödvar Bjarki
Hjörvard
Roar
Locations
Lejre
Uppsala
Fyrisvellir

Onela was, according to Beowulf, a Swedish king, the son of Ongentheow and the brother of Ohthere. He usurped the Swedish throne, but was killed by his nephew Eadgils, who won by hiring foreign assistance.

In Scandinavian sagas a Norwegian king by the same name exists, Áli (the Old Norse form of Onela, also rendered as Ole, Åle or Ale), who had the cognomen hinn Upplenzki ("from Oppland").

== Etymology ==
The name stems from the Proto-Norse Anulā, attested on the spear shaft SJy 68 from Nydam Mose. It is a diminutive with l-suffix to a name starting with *anu-, or directly of an appellative *anuz, "ancestor".

== Beowulf ==
In the Anglo-Saxon poem Beowulf, Onela plays a central part in the Swedish-Geatish wars. Onela and his brother Ohthere were the sons of the Swedish king Ongenþeow. When the Geatish king Hreðel died, Onela and Ohthere saw the opportunity to pillage in Geatland starting the Swedish-Geatish wars.

Lines 2472–2478:

Þa wæs synn and sacu · Swēona ond Ġēata,
ofer wīd wæter · wrōht ġemǣne,
herenīð hearda, · syððan Hrēðel swealt,
oð ðe him Ongenðeowes · eaferan wǣran
frome fyrdhwate, · frēode ne woldon
ofer heafo healdan, ac ymb Hrēosna Beorh
eatolne inwitscear · oft ġefremedon.

Translation:

There was strife and struggle 'twixt Swede and Geat
o'er the width of waters; war arose,
hard battle-horror, when Hrethel died,
and Ongentheow's offspring grew
strife-keen, bold, nor brooked o'er the seas;
pact of peace, but pushed their hosts
to harass in hatred by Hreosnabeorh.

The war ended with Ongenþeow's death.

It is implied by the poem that Onela eventually became king, because Ohthere's two sons, Eanmund and Eadgils, had to seek refuge with Heardred, Hygelac's successor as king of the Geats. This caused Onela to attack the Geats. During the battle, Eanmund was killed by Onela's champion Weohstan and Heardred was killed as well, after which Onela returned home.

Eadgils, however, survived and later, Beowulf helped him avenge Eanmund by slaying Onela.

By a conjectural emendation of line 62 of this poem some editors represent Onela as the son-in-law of Healfdene/Halfdan king of Denmark.

Family tree of the Scyldings (Kings of the Danes), Heathobards and Scylfings (Kings of the Swedes), according to Beowulf

♕ Heremod
♕ Scyld Scefing
♕ Beowulf
♕ Healfdene	♕ Ongentheow
♕ Heorogar	♕ Hrothgar	Wealhtheow	Halga	A daughter	♕ Onela	♕ Ohthere
Heoroweard	Hrethric	Hrothmund	Hrothulf	Froda	Eanmund	Eadgils
Freawaru	Ingeld

== Norse sources ==
The animosity between Eadgils and Onela also appears in Scandinavian tradition. In the Norse sagas, which were mostly based on Norwegian versions of Scandinavian legends, Onela seems to appear as Áli of Uppland, and is called Norwegian. By the time Ynglingatal was used as a source by Snorri Sturluson, there appears no longer to have been a Scandinavian tradition of Áli as a relation of Eadgils.

=== Ynglingatal ===
The earliest extant Scandinavian source where Onela appears is the 9th century skaldic poem Ynglingatal, Eadgils (Aðils) is called Onela's enemy (Ála dólgr). Ála is the genitive case of Áli, the Old Norse form of the name Onela.

Þat frák enn,
at Aðils fjǫrvi
vitta véttr
of viða skyldi.
Ok dáðgjarn
af drasils bógum
Freys ôttungr
falla skyldi.
Ok við aur
ægir hjarna
bragnings burs
of blandinn varð.
Ok dáðsæll
deyja skyldi
Ála dolgr
at Uppsǫlum.

‘I have learned, further, that the creature of charms [SORCERESS] had to destroy the life of Aðils. And the deed-eager descendant of Freyr [= Swedish king] had to fall off the back of the steed. And the sea [fluid] of the brains of the son of the ruler [RULER] was blended with mud. And the deed-fortunate enemy of Áli had to die at Uppsala.’

=== Sagas ===
In Skáldskaparmál, compiled by Snorri Sturluson and in Arngrímur Jónsson's Latin summary of Skjöldunga saga, the battle hinted at in Beowulf is treated in more detail.

Snorri first quotes the Kálfsvísa but only small parts of it:

Ali Hrafni, es til íss riðu, en annarr austr und Aðilsi grár hvarfaði, geiri undaðr.	Áli rode Hrafn, They who rode onto the ice: But another, southward, Under Adils, A gray one, wandered, Wounded with the spear.

Snorri then relates that Aðils was in war with a Norwegian king named Áli, and they fought in the Battle on the Ice of Lake Vänern. Aðils was married to Yrsa, the mother of Hrólfr (Hroðulf) and so sent an embassy to Hrólfr asking him for help against Áli. He would receive three valuable gifts in recompense. Hrólfr was involved in a war against the Saxons and could not come in person but sent his twelve berserkers, including Bödvar Bjarki. Áli died in the war, and Aðils took Áli's helmet Battle-boar and his horse Raven. The berserkers demanded three pounds of gold each in pay, and they demanded to choose the gifts that Aðils had promised Hrólfr, that is the two pieces of armour that nothing could pierce: the helmet battle-boar and the mailcoat Finn's heritage. They also wanted the famous ring Svíagris. Aðils considered the pay outrageous and refused.

In the Ynglinga saga, Snorri relates that king Eadgils fought hard battles with the Norwegian king who was called Áli hinn upplenzki. They fought on the ice of Lake Vänern, where Áli fell and Adils won. Snorri relates that much is told about this event in the Skjöldunga saga, and that Adils took Hrafn (Raven), Áli's horse.

The Saga of the Skjöldungs is lost but in the end of the 16th century, Arngrímur Jónsson saved a piece of information from this saga in Latin. He wrote: There was animosity between king Adils of Sweden and the Norwegian king Áli of Uppland. They decided to fight on the ice of Lake Vänern. Adils won and took his helmet, chainmail and horse.

== Secondary sources ==
Nerman, B., Det svenska rikets uppkomst. Stockholm, 1925.

Onela House of Yngling
Preceded by Ohthere	Legendary king of Sweden	Succeeded by Eadgils
